= 2023–24 Cambodian League 2 =

Cambodian League 2
- Season: 2023–24
- Dates: 16 September 2023 – 31 March 2024
- Champions: Life FC
- Promoted: Life FC; Ministry of Interior FA
- Matches: 126
- Goals: 190 (1.51 per match)
- Top goalscorer: Noun Borey (13 goals)

The 2023–24 Cambodian League 2 was the 6th season of the Cambodian League 2, second-tier football league for association football clubs in Cambodia. It began on 16 September 2023 and concluded on 31 March 2024, the first season to play in an inter-year schedule. Only a total of 8 football clubs ended up competing in the league this season after 6 teams had announced their withdrawal due to financial hardship.

Life FC Sihanoukville are the champion of the 2023–24 season and are promoted to the next Cambodian Premier League season alongside Ministry of Interior FA.

== Teams ==
=== Team changes ===
Relegated from 2022 Cambodian Premier League	Promoted to 2023–24 Cambodian Premier League
None	ISI Dangkor Senchey; Prey Veng
Withdrew	New clubs
Asia Euro United; Banteay Meanchey; Electricite du Cambodge; Koh Kong; Soltilo Angkor; Tboung Khmum	ISI Dangkor Senchey B Life; Tiffy Army B Visakha B

=== Team location ===
As of 24 September 2023

Club	Location	Stadium	Capacity
Angkor City	Siem Reap Province	Svay Thom Stadium	5,000
Bati Academy	Takéo	Bati Academy	N/A
ISI Dangkor Senchey B	Phnom Penh	AIA Stadium KMH PARK	3,000
Life	Sihanoukville	Life Stadium	4,000
Ministry of Interior FA	Kandal Province	Police Academy of Cambodia	5,000
Siem Reap	Siem Reap Province	Svay Thom Stadium	5,000
Tiffy Army B	Phnom Penh	RCAF Old Stadium	15,000
Visakha B	Phnom Penh	Prince Stadium	10,000

=== Personnel and kits ===
Team	Manager	Captain	Kit manufacturer	Shirt sponsor
Angkor City	(England) Darren Pomroy	(Cambodia) Yong Mengchhay	(Cambodia) NT Sport	
Bati Academy	(Japan) Koji Gyotoku	(Cambodia) Uk Devin		Football Federation of Cambodia
ISI Dangkor Senchey B	(Cambodia) Meas Samoeun	(Cambodia) Chan Houng	(Cambodia) NT Sport	Sathapana Bank
Life	(Cambodia) Kong Vicheka	(Cameroon) Cyrille Dissake	(Cambodia) NT Sport	
Ministry of Interior FA	(Cambodia) Sum Vanna	(Cambodia) Noun Borey	(Cambodia) NT Sport	General Commissariat of National Police
Siem Reap	(Cambodia) Ly Theara	(Cambodia) Koy Noraksakada	(Cambodia) NT Sport	
Tiffy Army B	(Cambodia) Khek Khemrin	(Cambodia) Tep Filib	(Cambodia) NT Sport	TIFFY
Visakha B	(Nigeria) Akeep Tuji Ayoyinka	(Cambodia) Reung Bunheing	(Cambodia) Forward Sportswear	Prince Bank

=== Foreign players ===
The number of foreign players is restricted to 6 per team. A team can use 4 foreign players on the field in each game, including at least 2 player from the AFC and the AFF region.

Players name in bold indicates the player is registered during the mid-season transfer window.

Club	Player 1	Player 2	Player 3	Player 4	AFC Player	ASEAN Player
Angkor City	(Brazil) Bruno Krenkel	(Democratic Republic of the Congo) Joslyn Ghifem Katuala	(Japan) **Kento Fujihara**	(United States) **Federico Diaz**	(Japan) Takuya Yamase	
ISI Dangkor Senchey B						
Bati Academy						
Life	(Cameroon) Cyrille Dissake	(Rwanda) Atuheire Kipson	(Nigeria) Okoro Osa Orobosa		(Japan) Kanta Asami	(Timor-Leste) Georgino Mendonça
Ministry of Interior FA						
Siem Reap	(Cameroon) David Koum	(Sierra Leone) Santigie Koroma			(Japan) Ryusei Furukawa	(Timor-Leste) Olagar Xavier
Tiffy Army B						
Visakha B						

== League table ==
Pos	Team	Pld	W	D	L	GF	GA	GD	Pts	
1	Life (C, P)	18	10	5	3	35	17	+18	35	Promotion to 2024–25 Cambodian Premier League
2	Ministry of Interior FA (P)	18	10	5	3	42	19	+23	35	Promotion to 2024–25 Cambodian Premier League
3	Tiffy Army B	18	8	4	6	26	19	+7	28	
4	Visakha B	18	7	6	5	29	28	+1	27	
5	ISI Dangkor Senchey B	18	4	5	9	23	43	−20	17	
6	Siem Reap	18	3	6	9	17	30	−13	15	
7	Bati Academy	18	3	5	10	18	34	−16	14	
8	Angkor City	0	0	0	0	0	0	0	0	Withdrew

Updated to match(es) played on 31 March 2024. Source: cpl-cambodia
Rules for classification: 1) Points; 2) Head to Head; 3) Goal difference; 4) Goals scored
(C) Champions; (P) Promoted

== Season statistics ==
=== Top scorers ===
As of 31 March 2024.

Rank	Player	Club	Goals
1	(Cambodia) Noun Borey	Ministry of Interior FA	13
2	(Rwanda) Atuheire Kipson	Life	10
3	(Cambodia) Choeun Nacha	Tiffy Army B	9
4	(Cambodia) Nat Neth	Visakha	7
5	(Timor-Leste) Olagar Xavier	Siem Reap	5
5	(Japan) Furukawa Ryusei	Siem Reap	5
5	(Cambodia) Sou Menghong	Bati Academy	5
6	(Cambodia) Pheouk Thathai	Visakha B	4
6	(Cambodia) Sin Sovannmakara	Visakha B	4
6	(Cambodia) Reung Bunheing	Visakha B	4
6	(Cambodia) Mean Chanrith	Visakha B	4
6	(Cambodia) Tep Filib	Tiffy Army	4
6	(Cambodia) Pov Phearith	Ministry of Interior FA	4
6	(Cambodia) Khem Lang Khe	Life	4

=== Clean sheets ===
As of 31 March 2024.

Rank	Player	Club	Clean sheets
1	(Timor-Leste) Georgino Mendoça	Life FC	6

== See also ==
- 2023–24 Cambodian Premier League
- 2023–24 Hun Sen Cup
- 2023 Cambodian League Cup
- 2023 Cambodian Super Cup
