= 2022 Hun Sen Cup =

Cambodian football tournament

Tournament details
- Country: Cambodia
- Venue: RSN Stadium
- Dates: 8 February – 6 November 2022
- Teams: 35

Final positions
- Champions: Visakha (3rd title)
- Runners-up: Boeung Ket
- Third place: Phnom Penh Crown

Tournament statistics
- Matches played: 168
- Goals scored: 404 (2.4 per match)
- Top goal scorer: Sieng Chanthea (6 goals)

Awards
- Best player: Mat Noron

The 2022 Hun Sen Cup was the 16th season of the Hun Sen Cup, the premier knockout tournament for association football clubs in Cambodia involving Cambodian Premier League, Cambodian League 2 and provincial football clubs organized by the Football Federation of Cambodia (FFC). The competition was split into 2 stages, the provincial stage which started on 8 February 2022 and the national stage with the top four teams from provincial stage entering the play-off of national stage, competing with the teams from Cambodian League 2.

Visakha were the defending champions and successfully defended their title, winning their record-extending 3rd consecutive and overall titles on 6 November.

== Provincial stage ==
=== Provincial group stage ===
Each group was played on a double round-robin basis at the pre-selected hosts. Group winners and runners-up advanced to Provincial quarter-finals.

==== Group A ====
Pos	Team	Pld	W	D	L	GF	GA	GD	Pts
1	Kampot FC	8	5	2	1	15	8	+7	17
2	Kep Province	8	4	3	1	12	6	+6	15
3	Industry Department of Takeo FC	8	2	3	3	8	9	−1	9
4	Shihanouk Province	8	2	3	3	6	8	−2	9
5	Education Department of Kampong Speu	8	0	3	5	3	13	−10	3

Source: https://www.facebook.com/officialhunsencup2007/photos/a.583247205198472/1848442125345634/

==== Group B ====
Pos	Team	Pld	W	D	L	GF	GA	GD	Pts
1	Phnom Penh Galaxy	6	4	2	0	17	11	+6	14
2	Svay Rieng Province	6	3	2	1	22	14	+8	11
3	Education Department of Kampong Cham	6	1	2	3	20	20	0	5
4	Kandal Province	6	1	0	5	11	25	−14	3

Source: https://www.facebook.com/officialhunsencup2007/photos/a.583247205198472/1848442125345634/

==== Group C ====
Pos	Team	Pld	W	D	L	GF	GA	GD	Pts
1	Rittysen FC	6	6	0	0	16	4	+12	18
2	Uddor Meanchey Province	6	1	2	3	9	10	−1	5
3	Sofia Pailin	6	1	2	3	7	12	−5	5
4	Battambang FC	6	0	4	2	13	19	−6	4

Source: https://www.facebook.com/officialhunsencup2007/photos/a.583247205198472/1848442125345634/

==== Group D ====
Pos	Team	Pld	W	D	L	GF	GA	GD	Pts
1	Kampong Thom Province FC	6	3	3	0	0	8	−8	12
2	Athireach Domrei Eysan FC	6	3	2	1	17	9	+8	11
3	Mondulkiri Province	6	3	1	2	12	11	+1	10
4	Preah Vihear Province	6	0	0	6	5	21	−16	0

Source: https://www.facebook.com/officialhunsencup2007/photos/a.583247205198472/1848442125345634/

=== Provincial stage quarter-finals ===
==== 1st leg ====
3 May 2022	Svay Rieng	2 - 2	Kampot
15:00 UTC+07		Report

3 May 2022	Kep	1 - 2	Phnom Penh Galaxy
15:00 UTC+07		Report

4 May 2022	Uddor Meanchey	0 - 1	Kampong Thom
15:00 UTC+07		Report

4 May 2022	Athireach Domrei Eysan	0 - 0	Ritthysen
15:00 UTC+07		Report

==== 2nd leg ====
10 May 2022	Kampot	2 - 1	Svay Rieng
15:00 UTC+07		Report

Kampot won 4-3 on aggregate.

10 May 2022	Phnom Penh Galaxy	5 - 0	Kep
15:00 UTC+07		Report

Phnmom Penh Galaxy won 7-1 on aggregate.

11 May 2022	Kampong Thom	1 - 2 (3-4 p)	Uddor Meanchey
15:00 UTC+07		Report

Uddor Meanchey won on penalties.

11 May 2022	Ritthysen	4 - 1	Athireach Domrei Eysan
15:00 UTC+07		Report

Ritthysen won 4-1 on aggregate.

=== Provincial stage semi-finals ===
==== 1st leg ====
25 May 2022	Kampot	1 - 1	Uddor Meanchey
15:00 UTC+07		Report

25 May 2022	Phnom Penh Galaxy	2 - 0	Ritthysen
15:00 UTC+07		Report

==== 2nd leg ====
1 June 2022	Uddor Meanchey	4 - 2	Kampot
15:00 UTC+07

Uddor Meanchey won 5-3 on aggregate .

1 June 2022	Ritthysen	1 - 0	Phnom Penh Galaxy
15:00 UTC+07

Phnom Penh Galaxy won 2-1 on aggregate

=== Provincial stage third place ===
11 June 2022
8:00

Kampot	0 – 2	Rittysen

EDC Stadium

=== Provincial stage finals ===
11 June 2022
15:30

Uddor Meanchey	0 – 1	Phnom Penh Galaxy

Cambodia Airways Stadium

=== Provincial stage awards ===
- Top goal scorer : Ung Visal of Svay Rieng Province (17 goals)
- Best coach : Phann Hai of Phnom Penh Galaxy
- Best goalkeeper : Sup Ahmat of Phnom Penh Galaxy

== National stage ==
The top four teams from Provincial stage with the 12 teams of Cambodian League 2 play in Play-off round. Winners will go to Round of 16 with the eight teams of Cambodian Premier League. Due to Tbong Khmum and Bati Youth Academy U-18 withdrew from the Cup, Electricite du Cambodge and National Police receive a bye to Round of 16.

=== Play-off round ===
==== 1st leg ====
21 June 2022	Kampot	2–5	Prey Veng	Kampot Stadium
15:30 UTC+07

21 June 2022	Rittysen	2–3	Koh Kong
15:30 UTC+07

21 June 2022	Uddor Meanchey	1–3	ISI Dangkor Senchey
15:30 UTC+07

22 June 2022	Phnom Penh Galaxy	2–1	Asia Euro United
15:30 UTC+07

22 June 2022	Siem Reap	3–2	Next Step	Siem Reap Stadium
15:30 UTC+07

22 June 2022	Soltilo Angkor	2–0	Banteay Meanchey	Hanuman Stadium
15:30 UTC+07

==== 2nd leg ====
6 July 2022	Prey Veng	9–1	Kampot	Prey Veng Stadium
15:30 UTC+07

Prey Veng won 14–3 on aggregate.

6 July 2022	Koh Kong	6–3	Rittysen
15:30 UTC+07

Koh Kong won 9–5 on aggregate.

6 July 2022	ISI Dangkor Senchey	6–0	Uddor Meanchey	KMH Park
15:30 UTC+07

ISI Dangkor Senchey won 9–1 on aggregate.

7 July 2022	Next Step	1–1	Siem Reap	Siem Reap Stadium
15:30 UTC+07

Siem Reap won 4–3 on aggregate.

7 July 2022	Banteay Meanchey	0–2	Soltilo Angkor
15:30 UTC+07

Soltilo Angkor won 4–0 on aggregate.

20 July 2022	Asia Euro United	3–0	Phnom Penh Galaxy	AEU Sport Park
15:30 UTC+07

Asia Euro United won 4–2 on aggregate.

=== Round of 16 ===
==== 1st leg ====
27 July 2022	Soltilo Angkor	0–1	Preah Khan Reach	Hanuman Stadium
15:30 UTC+07

27 July 2022	Siem Reap	0–6	Visakha	Siem Reap Stadium
15:30 UTC+07

27 July 2022	Asia Euro	0–4	Nagaworld	AEU Sport Park
15:30 UTC+07

27 July 2022	ISI Dangkor Senchey	0–2	Boeung Ket	Cambodia Airways Stadium
15:30 UTC+07

3 August 2022	Koh Kong	1–2	Angkor Tiger	Koh Kong Stadium
15:30 UTC+07		Report

3 August 2022	Prey Veng	0–1	Phnom Penh Crown	Prey Veng Stadium
15:30 UTC+07		Report

3 August 2022	National Police	1–2	National Army	7NG Stadium
15:30 UTC+07		Report

3 August 2022	EDC	3–2	Kirivong Sok Sen Chey	EDC Stadium
15:30 UTC+07		Report

==== 2nd leg ====
10 August 2022	Preah Khan Reach	4–0	Soltilo Angkor	Svay Rieng Stadium
18:30 UTC+07		Report

Preah Khan Reach won 5–0 on aggregate.

10 August 2022	Visakha	3–2	Siem Reap	Prince Stadium
18:30 UTC+07		Report

Visakha won 9–2 on aggregate.

10 August 2022	Nagaworld	0–0	Asia Euro	AEU Sport Park
18:30 UTC+07		Report

Nagaworld won 4–0 on aggregate.

10 August 2022	Boeung Ket	3–2	ISI Dangkor Senchey	Cambodia Airways Stadium
15:30 UTC+07		Report

Boeung Ket won 5–2 on aggregate.

17 August 2022	Angkor Tiger	1–3	Koh Kong	Hanuman Stadium
15:30 UTC+07		Report

Koh Kong won 4–3 on aggregate.

17 August 2022	Phnom Penh Crown	4–4	Prey Veng	RSN Stadium
18:30 UTC+07		Report

Phnom Penh Crown won 5–4 on aggregate.

17 August 2022	National Army	2–1	National Police	Army Stadium
18:30 UTC+07		Report

National Army won 4–2 on aggregate.

17 August 2022	Kirivong Sok Sen Chey	1–1	EDC	Kirivong Stadium
15:30 UTC+07		Report

EDC won 4–3 on aggregate.

=== Quarter-finals ===
==== 1st leg ====
24 August 2022	EDC	1–1	Preah Khan Reach	EDC Stadium
15:30 UTC+07	Chantheaka 87' (pen.)	Report	Visal 36'

24 August 2022	National Army	1–3	Visakha	Army Stadium
18:30 UTC+07	Soksana 83'	Report	Kakada 30'; Sokpheng 41', 87'

24 August 2022	Phnom Penh Crown	0–0	Nagaworld	RSN Stadium
18:30 UTC+07		Report

24 August 2022	Koh Kong	0–2	Boeung Ket
15:30 UTC+07		Report	Mat Noron 9' (pen.); Chanthea 72'

==== 2nd leg ====
31 August 2022	Preah Khan Reach	1–3	EDC	Svay Rieng Stadium
18:30 UTC+07	Samnang 41'	Report	Vannak 4'; Sokha 63'; Kimhong 77'

EDC won 4–2 on aggregate.

31 August 2022	Visakha	3–0	National Army	Prince Stadium
18:30 UTC+07	Chantha Bin 25'; Sa Ty 42'; Kakada 45'	Report

Visakha won 6–1 on aggregate.

31 August 2022	Nagaworld	0–0 (3–4 p)	Phnom Penh Crown	Army Stadium
18:30 UTC+07		Report
	Penalties
	Rothserey (penalty scored); Sokumpheak (penalty scored); Suhana (penalty scored); Matnorotin (penalty missed); Makara (penalty missed)		(penalty scored) Chanchav; (penalty scored) Polin; (penalty missed) Muslim; (penalty scored) Thiva; (penalty scored) Pisoth

Phnom Penh Crown won on penalties.

31 August 2022	Boeung Ket	3–3	Koh Kong	Cambodia Airways Stadium
15:30 UTC+07	Chhaya 28' (o.g.); Noron 36'; Chanthea 77'	Report	Bora 8'; Taimo 46'; Phearith 87'

Boeung Ket won 5–3 on aggregate.

=== Semi-finals ===
==== 1st leg ====
5 October 2022	Boeung Ket	3–0	EDC	Cambodia Airways Stadium
15:30 UTC+07	Rosib 22'; Noron 25', 90+3'	Report

5 October 2022	Phnom Penh Crown	1–2	Visakha	RSN Stadium
18:30 UTC+07	Devid 16'	Report	Sovann 6'; Bunheing 51'

==== 2nd leg ====
12 October 2022	EDC	0–2	Boeung Ket	EDC Stadium
15:30 UTC+07		Report	Rosib 24'; Chanthea 87'

Boeung Ket won 5–0 on aggregate.

12 October 2022	Visakha	2–1	Phnom Penh Crown	Prince Stadium
18:30 UTC+07	Bunheing 15', 40'	Report	Polin 90+2'

Visakha won 4–2 on aggregate.

=== Third place play-off ===
6 November 2022
15:30 UTC+07

EDC	0–5	Phnom Penh Crown
	Report	Thiva 48', 90+8'; Rozak 71'; Pich 83'; Chamroeun 90+13'

RSN Stadium, Phnom Penh
Referee: Eav Tina

=== Final ===
6 November 2022
18:30 UTC+07

Boeung Ket	3–4 (a.e.t.)	Visakha
Chanthea 14', 31'; Phearon 102'	Report	Sophanat 79'; Soksela 90+6'; Chantha Bin 98'; Sokpheng 104'

RSN Stadium, Phnom Penh
Attendance: 5,278

=== Awards ===
- Top goal scorer : Sieng Chanthea of Boeung Ket (6 goals)
- Best goalkeeper : Keo Soksela of Visakha
- Best player : Mat Noron of Boeung Ket
- Best coach : Meas Channa of Visakha
- Fair play : Visakha

== See also ==
- 2022 Cambodian Premier League
- 2022 Cambodian League 2
