= 2022 Cambodian League 2 =

Cambodian League 2
- Season: 2022
- Dates: 6 March – 30 October 2022
- Champions: Electricite du Cambodge
- Promoted: ISI Dangkor Senchey; Prey Veng
- Matches: 132
- Goals: 556 (4.21 per match)
- Top goalscorer: Louis Willy Ndongo (30 goals)
- Biggest home win: Soltilo Angkor 11–0 Next Step (2nd October)
- Biggest away win: Banteay Meanchey 1–13 Prey Veng (28th August)
- Highest scoring: Banteay Meanchey 1–13 Prey Veng (28th August)
- Longest winning run: 8 matches Electricite du Cambodge
- Longest unbeaten run: 11 matches Electricite du Cambodge
- Longest losing run: 12 matches Banteay Meanchey
- Highest attendance: 3,296; ISI Dangkor Senchey 4–1 National Football Academy (2nd October)

The 2022 Cambodian League 2 is the 5th season of the Cambodian League 2, second-tier football league for association football clubs in Cambodia. A total of 12 football clubs are competing in the league. Electricite du Cambodge are the champion of the 2022 season; however, they are not met the requirement of national club licensing criteria alongside the third place National Police and the fourth place Koh Kong. Thus, they're ineligible for promotion. That leaves the runners up ISI Dangkor Senchey and the fifth place Prey Veng to be promoted for Cambodian Premier League next season.

== Teams ==
=== Team changes ===
Relegated from 2021 C-League	Promoted to 2023–24 Cambodian Premier League
Asia Euro United; Electricite du Cambodge; National Police; Prey Veng; Soltilo Angkor	Electricite du Cambodge; ISI Dangkor Senchey

=== Team locations ===
Locations of the 2022 Cambodian League 2 teams

Club	Location
Asia Euro United	Kandal Province
Banteay Meanchey	Banteay Meanchey Province
Bati Academy	Phnom Penh
Electricite du Cambodge	Phnom Penh
ISI Dangkor Senchey	Phnom Penh
Koh Kong	Koh Kong Province
National Police	Kandal Province
Next Step	Siem Reap Province
Prey Veng	Prey Veng Province
Siem Reap	Siem Reap Province
Soltilo Angkor	Siem Reap Province
Tboung Khmum	Tboung Khmum Province

=== Personnel and kits ===
Team	Manager	Captain	Kit manufacturer	Shirt sponsor
Asia Euro United	(Cambodia) Sok Veasna	(Cambodia) Lay Raksmey	(Cambodia) NT Sport	Asia Euro University
Banteay Meanchey	(Cambodia) Yeak Chhim	(Cambodia) Chet Sophannit		
Bati Academy	(Japan) Koji Gyotoku			Football Federation of Cambodia
Electricite du Cambodge	(Cambodia) Tum Saray	(Cambodia) Chhoeung Visinu	(Cambodia) Forward Sportswear	Electricite du Cambodge
ISI Dangkor Senchey	(Ghana) John Botioba	(Cambodia) Sun Sovannarith	(Cambodia) NT Sport	ISI Palm
Koh Kong	(Cambodia) Hok Sochivorn	(Cambodia) Touch Pancharong	(Cambodia) NT Sport	
National Police	(Cambodia) Ung Kanyanith	(Cambodia) Say Piseth	(Cambodia) FAN	General Commissariat of National Police
Next Step	(England) Darren Pomroy	(Cambodia) Yok Ary	(Cambodia) NT Sport	
Prey Veng	(Cambodia) Long Rithea	(Cambodia) Tith Dina	(Cambodia) Forward Sportswear	
Siem Reap	(Cambodia) Ly Theara		(Cambodia) NT Sport	
Soltilo Angkor	(Cambodia) Chea Mengly	(Cambodia) Im Vakhim	(Cambodia) Forward Sportswear	
Tboung Khmum	(Cambodia) Phon Raksmeypich		(Cambodia) NT Sport	

=== Foreign players ===
The number of foreign players is restricted to 4 per team. A team can use 3 foreign players on the field in each game, including at least 1 player from the AFC region.

Players name in bold indicates the player is registered during the mid-season transfer window.

Club	Player 1	Player 2	Player 3	AFC Player	Former Players
Asia Euro United	(Nigeria) Samuel Ajayi	(Cameroon) Louis Willy Ndongo	(Cameroon) **Mintah Bernard Owusu**	(Japan) Kanta Asami	
Banteay Meanchey	(Italy) **Simone Valli**	(Democratic Republic of the Congo) **Joslyn Ghifem Katuala**		(Nepal) **Thapa Magar Saroj**	
Bati Academy					
Electricite du Cambodge					
ISI Dangkor Senchey	(Ivory Coast) Abdel Kader Coulibaly	(Ivory Coast) **Ibrahim Abou Dicko**	(Egypt) **Elsayed Mahmoud**	(Japan) Kento Fujihara	(Cameroon) Baldwin Ngwa (Brazil) Victor Cabral
Koh Kong	(Cameroon) Abbee Ndjoo	(Sierra Leone) Umaru Samura		(Myanmar) Thiha Zaw	(Sierra Leone) Santigie Koroma
National Police	(Cameroon) Andre Roland Longnyo	(Nigeria) **Rasheed Omokafe**	(Nigeria) **Esoh Paul Omogba**		
Next Step	(Brazil) Bruno Krenkel	(Morocco) **Ayoub Achqaf**	(France) **Florian Charreau**	(Japan) Takuya Yamase	(Brazil) Douglas Caldas
Prey Veng	(Nigeria) Nduka Uche Raoul	(Nigeria) **Ekene Azike**	(Poland) (Germany) **Chris Jastrzembski**		(Trinidad and Tobago) Seon Power (Uzbekistan) Alisher Mirzaev
Siem Reap	(Cameroon) Cyrille Dissake	(Brazil) **Victor Cabral**		(Japan) **Shota Fujishiro**	(Morocco) Ayoub Achqaf (Brazil) Magson Dourado
Soltilo Angkor	(Cameroon) Yannick Francois	(Nigeria) **Dzarma Bata**	(Rwanda) **Atuheire Kipson**	(Japan) Unno Tomoyuki	
Tbong Khmum	(Sierra Leone) **Santigie Koroma**	(Democratic Republic of the Congo) **Nathan Kabangu**			(Colombia) Mateo Zapata

== League table ==
Pos	Team	Pld	W	D	L	GF	GA	GD	Pts	Qualification or relegation
1	Electricite du Cambodge (C)	22	16	3	3	52	19	+33	51 (Note: Head-to-head points: Electricite du Cambodge 3, ISI Dangkor Senchey 3. Head-to-head goal differences: Electricite du Cambodge +2, ISI Dangkor Senchey -2)	
2	ISI Dangkor Senchey (P)	22	16	3	3	62	20	+42	51	Promotion to 2023-24 Cambodian Premier League
3	National Police	22	15	3	4	58	24	+34	48	
4	Koh Kong	22	14	4	4	81	30	+51	46	
5	Prey Veng (Note: Since Electricite du Cambodge, National Police and Koh Kong fail to meet the requirement of national club licensing criteria, they're ineligible for promotion. That leaves runners up ISI Dangkor Senchey and 5th place Prey Veng to be promoted to the first division for the 2023-24 season.) (P)	22	14	2	6	71	28	+43	44	Promotion to 2023-24 Cambodian Premier League
6	Asia Euro United	22	12	2	8	60	42	+18	38	
7	Soltilo Angkor	22	9	3	10	49	26	+23	30	
8	Bati Academy	22	6	3	13	35	41	−6	21	
9	Siem Reap	22	6	2	14	27	53	−26	20	
10	Tboung Khmum	22	5	4	13	24	67	−43	19	
11	Next Step	22	2	0	20	15	91	−76	6	
12	Banteay Meanchey	22	1	3	18	22	115	−93	6	

Updated to match(es) played on 30 October 2022. Source: Official Facebook page of Cambodian League 2
Rules for classification: 1) Points; 2) Head to Head; 3) Goal difference; 4) Goals scored
(C) Champions; (P) Promoted

== Top scorers ==
As of 30 October 2022.

Rank	Player	Club	Goals
1	(Cameroon) Louis Willy Ndongo	Asia Euro United	30
2	(Cameroon) Abbee Ndjoo	Koh Kong	25
3	(Ivory Coast) Abdel Kader Coulibaly	ISI Dangkor Senchey	20
4	(Myanmar) Thiha Zaw	Koh Kong	15
5	(Cambodia) Chhout Senteang	Electricite du Cambodge	14
5	(Cambodia) Sary Taimou	Koh Kong	14
5	(Nigeria) Ekene Azike	Prey Veng	14
8	(Cameroon) Yannick Francois	Soltilo Angkor	11
8	(Nigeria) Esoh Paul Omogba	National Police	11
10	(Brazil) Bruno Krenkel	Next Step	10

Source: Top Scorers in week 22

== See also ==
- 2022 Cambodian Premier League
- 2022 Hun Sen Cup
