= 2021 Cambodian Second League =

Fourth season of Cambodian second football league

Cambodian Second League
- Season: 2021
- Champions: Bati Academy
- Matches: 28
- Goals: 88 (3.14 per match)
- Biggest home win: Bati Academy 4–0 Tbong Khmum (21 December 2021)
- Biggest away win: Rithi Sen 0–4 Bati Academy (27 November 2021)
- Highest scoring: Banteay Mean Chey 2–5 Tbong Khmum (27 November 2021)
- Longest winning run: Bati Academy (4 matches)
- Longest unbeaten run: ISI Dangkor Senchey (6 matches)
- Longest losing run: Banteay Mean Chey (3 matches)

The 2021 Cambodian Second League will be the fourth season of Cambodian Second League, the second-tier of Cambodian football. It was first started off in 2016 by the Football Federation of Cambodia. A total of eight teams will play each other a single round robin matches. The winner will promote to 2022 Cambodian League.However, due to the new policies and regulations implemented by the newly established Cambodian League Company; none of the teams from the 2021 Second League season would be promoted to the first division because they had failed to meet the licensing requirements.

== Teams ==
Team	Location	Stadium
ISI Dangkor Senchey	Phnom Penh	KMH Stadium
Koh Kong	Koh Kong Province	Koh Kong Stadium
Tiffy Army U-21	Phnom Penh	RCAF Old Stadium
Bati Academy	Takeo	Bati Football School
Rithi Sen	Kampong Chhnang Province	Kampong Chhnang Stadium
Siem Reap	Siem Reap Province	Siem Reap Stadium
Banteay Mean Chey	Banteay Mean Chey Province	Kla Kon Stadium
Tbong Khmum	Tbong Khmum Province	Tbong Khmum Stadium

== League table ==
Pos	Team	Pld	W	D	L	GF	GA	GD	Pts	Promotion
1	Bati Academy	7	6	0	1	18	4	+14	18	Champion
2	ISI Dangkor Senchey	7	5	1	1	15	6	+9	16	
3	Tbong Khmum	7	4	2	1	12	10	+2	14	
4	Siem Reap	7	3	1	3	12	14	−2	10	
5	Koh Kong	7	2	1	4	11	12	−1	7	
6	Rithi Sen	7	1	3	3	9	14	−5	6	
7	Tiffy Army U-21	7	1	2	4	6	15	−9	5	
8	Banteay Mean Chey	7	0	2	5	5	13	−8	2	

Source: https://troryorng.com/35958/

== Results ==
Home \ Away	BAT	BMC	ISI	KOH	NDM	RIT	SFC	TBK
Bati Academy	—	1–0		4–2			2–1	4–0
Banteay Mean Chey		—	0–2		1–1	1–1		2–5
ISI Dangkor Senchey	1–0		—			2–2	4–1	
Koh Kong		1–0	1–2	—	1–2			1–1
Tiffy Army U-21	0–3		0–3		—	2–2		
Rithi Sen	0–4			0–3		—	3–0	
Siem Reap		2–1		3–2	4–1		—	1–1
Tbong Khmum			2–1		1–0	2–1		—

Updated to match(es) played on 25 December 2021. Source:
Legend: Blue = home team win; Yellow = draw; Red = away team win.

== Season statistics ==
=== Top scorers ===
As of 11 December 2021.

Rank	Player	Club	Goals
1	(Cambodia) San Bora	Koh Kong	5
2	(Cambodia) Chan Vibol David	Bati Academy	4
3	(Cambodia) Khorn Soben	Bati Academy	3
3	(Cambodia) Konay Ansari	ISI Dangkor Senchey	3
3	(Cambodia) Rath Virak	ISI Dangkor Senchey	3
3	(Cambodia) Sari Taymo	Tbong Khmum	3
7	(Cambodia) 8 Players	5 teams	2
15	(Cambodia) 13 Players	6 teams	1

=== Clean sheets ===
As of 11 December 2021.

Rank	Player	Club	Clean sheets
1	(Cambodia) Reth Lyheng	Bati Academy	3
2	(Cambodia) Chheng Chantha	ISI Dangkor Senchey	2
3	(Cambodia) Khandeth Sothea Vathana	Koh Kong	1
3	(Cambodia) Samath Ravy	Tbong Khmum	1

== Awards ==
Awards	Nation/Name	Club
Player of the season	(Cambodia) Meuet Setsen	Tbong Khmum
Goalkeeper of the season	(Cambodia) Reth Lyheng	Bati Academy
Coach of the season	(Japan) Koji Gyotoku	Bati Academy

Awards	Club
Fair Play	Tbong Khmum FC
