= 2016 Cambodian Second League =

Cambodian Second League
- Season: 2016
- Champions: Kirivong Sok Sen Chey (1st title)
- Promoted: Kirivong Sok Sen Chey, Electricite du Cambodge
- Top goalscorer: Phanny E Ratha (9 goals)

The Cambodian Second League was founded by the Football Federation of Cambodia. During the league, nine teams compete against each other for the 2017 Cambodian League.

== Rules ==
One team from each of the six different areas can enter the Cambodian Second League. Four teams from each of these Provinces: Western, Eastern, Northern, and Central- compete for entry. The Southern Province has five teams, and there are three teams from the Municipal Province.

The top team from each region plays in the Cambodian Second League upon qualification. The six teams that play in the Cambodian Second League are not permitted to have foreign players. Each team is required to have an even number of players under 21 years of age, and players over 21 years of age.

During the competition there is no game play off. Each team played on a single round-robin basis at the pre-selected hosts. The top two teams will play in the top leagues of the 2017 season.

The Cambodian Second League begins in early April 2016 and continues until June 2016. Games are held every Sunday.

The clubs that play in the top league have youth teams who play in Cambodian Second League, and the Football Federation of Cambodia will allow them to join the competition. However, if their youth team finished in the top two, it will not be allowed to play in the top league. Instead, it will play teams that finished 3rd or 4th in the competition.

Youth players who are members of the Under 16 Cambodia National Football Team and trained at the Bati training center are not allowed to join the competition.

== Teams ==
- Electricite du Cambodge
- Bati Academy
- Kampong Chhnang
- Kampong Speu
- Kirivong Sok Sen Chey
- Ministry of National Defense Academy
- Siem Reap Angkor
- Sihanoukville Autonomous Port
- Svay Rieng

== Stadiums and locations ==
Locations of teams in the 2016 Cambodian Second League

Team	Location	Stadium	Capacity
Electricite du Cambodge	Prey Veng	Prey Veng Stadium	
Bati Academy	Takeo	Tonle Bati National Training Center	
Kampong Chhnang Province	Kampong Chhnang	Kampong Chhnang Stadium	
Kampong Speu Province	Kampong Speu	Kampong Speu Stadium	
Kirivong Sok Sen Chey	Takeo	Kirivong Stadium	
Ministry of National Defense Academy	Phnom Penh	RCAF Old Stadium	10,000
Siem Reap Angkor	Siem Reap	Svay Thom Stadium	
Sihanoukville Autonomous Port	Sihanoukville	Life University Stadium	
Svay Rieng Province	Svay Rieng	Svay Rieng Stadium	1,500

== League table ==
Pos	Team	Pld	W	D	L	GF	GA	GD	Pts	Promotion
1	Kirivong Sok Sen Chey	8	5	2	1	29	10	+19	17	Promotion to 2017 Cambodian League
2	Electricite du Cambodge	8	5	2	1	29	10	+19	17	Promotion to 2017 Cambodian League
3	Bati Academy	8	4	3	1	15	10	+5	15	
4	Siem Reap Angkor	8	4	2	2	16	7	+9	14	
5	Svay Rieng Province	6	2	3	1	11	8	+3	9	
6	Sihanoukville Autonomous Port	5	3	0	2	5	8	−3	9	
7	Kampong Chhnang Province	5	1	0	4	8	12	−4	3	
8	Kampong Speu Province	5	0	1	4	3	19	−16	1	
9	Ministry of National Defense Academy	5	0	0	5	3	18	−15	0	

== Result table ==
Home \ Away	EDC	BAT	KCP	KSP	KSS	MND	SRA	SAP	SVR
Electricite du Cambodge									1–2
Bati Academy								0–1	
Kampong Chhnang Province	2–3								
Kampong Speu Province		2–2							
Kirivong Sok Sen Chey						6–0			
Ministry of National Defense Academy									
Siem Reap Angkor				6–0					
Sihanoukville Autonomous Port			1–0						
Svay Rieng Province					2–6				

Updated to match(es) played on 14 september 2016. Source: cambodialeague.com
Legend: Blue = home team win; Yellow = draw; Red = away team win.

== Top scorers ==
Rank	Player	Club	Goals
1	(Cambodia) Phanny E Ratha	Electricite du Cambodge	9
2	(Cambodia) In Savdy	Kirivong Sok Sen Chey	6
2	(Cambodia) Sok Chanraksmey	Electricite du Cambodge	6
4	(Cambodia) Meak Chordaravuth	Svay Rieng Province	5

== Awards ==
- The player of the season: Sieng Chanthea of Bati Academy
- Top goal scorer: Phanny E Ratha of Electricite du Cambodge (9 goals)
- The goalkeeper of the season: Srun Sengly of Kirivong Sok Sen Chey
- The coach of the season: Phan Chanphat of Kirivong Sok Sen Chey
- Fair play: Kirivong Sok Sen Chey

== See also ==
- 2016 Cambodian League
- 2016 Hun Sen Cup
