= 2018 Cambodian League =

Cambodian League
- Season: 2018
- Champions: Nagaworld FC
- Relegated: Western Phnom Penh FC
- AFC Cup: Nagaworld FC
- Matches: 132
- Goals: 495 (3.75 per match)
- Top goalscorer: George Bisan (28 goals)
- Biggest home win: Nagaworld 10–1 Western Phnom Penh (17 June 2018)
- Biggest away win: Electricite du Cambodge 1–9 National Defense (30 September 2018)
- Highest scoring: Nagaworld 10–1 Western Phnom Penh (17 June 2018)
- Longest winning run: Nagaworld (8 games)
- Longest unbeaten run: Boeung Ket (15 games)
- Longest winless run: Western Phnom Penh ( 22 Games )
- Longest losing run: Western Phnom Penh (14 games)
- Highest attendance: 4257; Angkor Tiger 2–2 Boeung Ket (23 September 2018)

2018 Cambodian League is the 34th season of the Cambodian League. Contested by 12 clubs, it operates on a system of promotion and relegation with Cambodian Second League. The league starts from 3 March until 30 September. Boeung Ket are the defending champions. Nagaworld FC won the champion again after waiting since 2009.

== 2018 season clubs ==
=== Teams ===
Locations of the 2018 Cambodian Premier League teams

| Team | Location | Stadium | Last season |
|---|---|---|---|
| Angkor Tiger | Siem Reap Province | Svay Thom Stadium | Premier League (7th) |
| Asia Euro United | Kandal Province | AEU Sport Park | Premier League (10th) |
| Boeung Ket | Kandal Province | Kandal Stadium | Premier League (champions) |
| Electricite du Cambodge | Phnom Penh | EDC Stadium | Premier League (9th) |
| Nagaworld | Kandal Province | AEU Sport Park | Premier League (3rd) |
| National Defense Ministry | Phnom Penh | RCAF Old Stadium | Premier League (4th) |
| National Police Commissary | Kandal Province | SCT Sports Complex | Premier League (6th) |
| Phnom Penh Crown | Phnom Penh | RSN Stadium | Premier League (5th) |
| Preah Khan Reach Svay Rieng | Svay Rieng Province | Svay Rieng Stadium | Premier League (2nd) |
| Soltilo Angkor | Siem Reap Province | Svay Thom Stadium | Second League (4th) |
| Western Phnom Penh | Phnom Penh | Western Stadium | Premier League (8th) |
| Visakha | Phnom Penh | Western Stadium | Second League (champions) |

Source: FIFA Soccerway Cambodian League

=== Personnel and Kits ===
| Team | Manager | Captain | Kit manufacturer |
|---|---|---|---|
| Angkor Tiger | (Spain) Oriol Mahedano | (Japan) Masahiro Fukasawa | NT Sport |
| Asia Euro United | (Cambodia) Sok Veasna | (Cambodia) Mat Hosan | NT Sport |
| Boeung Ket | (Cambodia) Hav Socheat | (Cambodia) Sun Sovannrithy | FBT |
| Electricite du Cambodge | (Cambodia) Prak Vuthy | (Cambodia) Tum Saray | |
| Nagaworld | (Cambodia) Meas Channa | (Cambodia) Kouch Sokumpheak | FBT |
| National Defense Ministry | (Cambodia) Phea Sopheaktra | (Cambodia) Reung Bunheing | |
| National Police Commissary | (Cambodia) Nuth Sony | (Cambodia) Say Piseth | Warrix Sports |
| Phnom Penh Crown | (England) Sean Sainsbury | (Cambodia) Ouk Sothy | FBT |
| Preah Khan Reach Svay Rieng | (Republic of Ireland) Conor Nestor | (Cambodia) Chea Samnang | FBT |
| Soltilo Angkor | (Japan) Yuki Matsuda | (Japan) Kento Fujihara | SUSI |
| Western Phnom Penh | (Malaysia) Fisol Lasak | (Cambodia) Lim You | NT Sport |
| Visakha | (Cambodia) Hok Sochivorn | (Cambodia) Tieng Tiny | NT Sport |

== Foreign players ==
The number of foreign players is restricted to five per team. A team can use four foreign players on the field in each game, including at least one player from the AFC country.

Players name in bold indicates the player is registered during the mid-season transfer window.

| Club | Player 1 | Player 2 | Player 3 | Player 4 | AFC Player | Former Players |
|---|---|---|---|---|---|---|
| Angkor Tiger | (Japan) Masahiro Fukasawa | (Japan) Kenjiro Ogino | (Japan) Kazuteru Okamoto | (Japan) **Joichiro Sugiyama** | (Japan) Ryota Hayashi | (Cameroon) Baldwin Ngwa |
| Asia Euro United | (Nigeria) Momoh Degule | (Cameroon) Befolo Mbarga | (Nigeria) **Chigozie Nwaokorie** | (Nigeria) **George Kelechi** | (Japan) Tomohiro Masaki | (Nigeria) Okereke Timothy (Iran) Hedayati Mohamad |
| Boeung Ket | (Brazil) Maycon Calijuri | (Nigeria) Samuel Ajayi | (Nigeria) Julius Oiboh | (Nigeria) Esoh Paul Omogba | (Japan) Hikaru Mizuno | |
| Electricite du Cambodge | None | None | None | None | None | None |
| Nagaworld | (Ivory Coast) Anderson Zogbe | (Japan) Tatsuro Inui | (Nigeria) George Bisan | (Nigeria) Mathew Osa | (South Korea) **Song Chi-hun** | (South Korea) Han Sung-gyu |
| National Defense | (Japan) Yudai Ogawa | (South Korea) Yoo Jae-ho | (Egypt) **Mohamed Hamza** | | (South Korea) Na Hyo-sung | (South Korea) Lee Jun-hyeob (Japan) Daiki Matsumoto (South Korea) Song Chi-hun |
| National Police | (Japan) Yuta Suzuki | (Nigeria) Adekunjo Busayo | (Nigeria) **Oladipupo Abiodun** | (South Korea) **Kim Dong-yoo** | (South Korea) No Dae-ho | (South Korea) Noh Sang-min (South Africa) Matthew Rhoda |
| Phnom Penh Crown | (United States) Jonny Campbell | (Japan) Atsushi Shirota | (Lesotho) Sunny Jane | (Brazil) **Valci Júnior** | (Iran) Pouya Hosseini | (Antigua and Barbuda) Jorrin John |
| Preah Khan Reach | (Japan) Ryota Ishikawa | (Scotland) **Harley Willard** | (Brazil) **Sergio Barbosa** | (Belarus) **Dmitry Asnin** | (Japan) Daisuke Kobayashi | (South Africa) Shane Booysen (South Korea) Whoo Hyun (Trinidad and Tobago) Trevin Caesar |
| Soltilo Angkor | (Japan) Yuta Kikuchi | (Japan) Kento Fujihara | (Nigeria) Dzarma Bata | (Ghana) James Abban | (Japan) Unno Tomoyuki | |
| Western Phnom Penh | (Indonesia) **Tenius Trukna** | (Indonesia) **Yuspen Uopdana** | | | (Indonesia) **Faisal Rizal Samberbori** | (Japan) Takahito Ota (Japan) Horri Ikki (South Korea) Yoon Sug-hee (Nigeria) Nwankwo Chika Junior |
| Visakha | (North Korea) Choe Myong-ho | (North Korea) Ri Hyok-chol | (North Korea) Pak Song-chol | (North Korea) Jang Song-hyok | (North Korea) Kim Kyong-hun | |

== League table ==
| Pos | Team | Pld | W | D | L | GF | GA | GD | Pts | Qualification or relegation |
|---|---|---|---|---|---|---|---|---|---|---|
| 1 | Nagaworld | 22 | 18 | 2 | 2 | 66 | 17 | +49 | 56 | 2019 AFC Cup group stage |
| 2 | Boeung Ket | 22 | 15 | 4 | 3 | 52 | 23 | +29 | 49 | |
| 3 | Visakha | 22 | 14 | 3 | 5 | 54 | 24 | +30 | 45 | |
| 4 | National Defense Ministry | 22 | 13 | 3 | 6 | 55 | 25 | +30 | 42 | |
| 5 | Phnom Penh Crown | 22 | 11 | 3 | 8 | 41 | 33 | +8 | 36 | |
| 6 | Preah Khan Reach Svay Rieng | 22 | 10 | 3 | 9 | 52 | 41 | +11 | 33 | |
| 7 | Asia Euro United | 22 | 8 | 6 | 8 | 46 | 44 | +2 | 30 | |
| 8 | Angkor Tiger | 22 | 7 | 7 | 8 | 33 | 33 | 0 | 28 | |
| 9 | National Police Commissary | 22 | 7 | 4 | 11 | 37 | 48 | −11 | 25 | |
| 10 | Soltilo Angkor | 22 | 5 | 5 | 12 | 29 | 34 | −5 | 20 | |
| 11 | Electricite du Cambodge | 22 | 2 | 3 | 17 | 16 | 75 | −59 | 9 | |
| 12 | Western Phnom Penh | 22 | 0 | 1 | 21 | 14 | 98 | −84 | 1 | Relegation to 2019 Cambodian Second League |

First match(es) will be played: unknown. Source: FIFA Soccerway Cambodian League
Rules for classification: 1) Points; 2) Goal difference; 3) Goals scored

== Results ==
=== Results table ===
| Home \ Away | AKT | AEU | BOE | EDC | NAG | NDM | NPC | PPC | PKR | SOL | VSK | WPP |
|---|---|---|---|---|---|---|---|---|---|---|---|---|
| Angkor Tiger | — | 0–0 | 2–2 | 3–1 | 1–1 | 0–1 | 3–1 | 2–5 | 1–1 | 0–0 | 0–2 | 2–0 |
| Asia Euro United | 2–2 | — | 3–4 | 2–2 | 1–6 | 1–2 | 1–1 | 3–2 | 2–1 | 0–1 | 2–4 | 6–1 |
| Boeung Ket | 4–0 | 4–0 | — | 5–0 | 3–2 | 2–0 | 5–1 | 1–2 | 3–1 | 2–1 | 1–0 | 5–1 |
| Electricite du Cambodge | 0–5 | 0–2 | 1–1 | — | 1–5 | 1–9 | 1–4 | 0–4 | 2–4 | 0–3 | 0–4 | 3–1 |
| Nagaworld | 3–0 | 3–0 | 2–0 | 2–0 | — | 2–0 | 6–2 | 2–1 | 0–0 | 4–1 | 0–3 | 10–1 |
| National Defense Ministry | 2–0 | 3–1 | 2–0 | 4–0 | 0–2 | — | 3–1 | 0–2 | 0–1 | 3–1 | 2–2 | 8–0 |
| National Police Commissary | 2–1 | 2–2 | 0–1 | 4–1 | 2–4 | 0–4 | — | 0–1 | 0–0 | 1–1 | 3–1 | 6–0 |
| Phnom Penh Crown | 0–4 | 1–1 | 2–3 | 0–0 | 0–1 | 1–5 | 4–0 | — | 2–1 | 1–0 | 1–3 | 6–0 |
| Preah Khan Reach Svay Rieng | 1–3 | 1–6 | 0–1 | 5–1 | 0–4 | 1–2 | 4–0 | 6–3 | — | 5–2 | 5–4 | 8–0 |
| Soltilo Angkor | 0–0 | 1–2 | 1–1 | 4–0 | 0–2 | 2–2 | 1–2 | 1–2 | 1–2 | — | 0–2 | 3–0 |
| Visakha | 4–1 | 0–2 | 1–1 | 4–0 | 1–2 | 2–0 | 4–1 | 0–0 | 3–2 | 2–1 | — | 5–0 |
| Western Phnom Penh | 1–3 | 3–7 | 1–3 | 0–2 | 0–3 | 3–3 | 0–4 | 0–1 | 1–3 | 1–4 | 0–3 | — |

Updated to match(es) played on 11 Mar 2018. Source: SOCCERWAY
Legend: Blue = home team win; Yellow = draw; Red = away team win.
For upcoming matches, an "a" indicates there is an article about the rivalry between the two participants.

=== Results by match played ===
| Team ╲ Round | 1 | 2 | 3 | 4 | 5 | 6 | 7 | 8 | 9 | 10 | 11 | 12 | 13 | 14 | 15 | 16 | 17 | 18 | 19 | 20 | 21 | 22 |
|---|---|---|---|---|---|---|---|---|---|---|---|---|---|---|---|---|---|---|---|---|---|---|
| Angkor Tiger | L | L | L | W | W | D | W | L | D | L | L | L | L | D | D | W | W | W | D | W | D | D |
| Asia Euro United | L | W | L | W | L | D | D | D | W | W | W | L | L | L | L | L | W | D | D | W | D | W |
| Boeung Ket | W | W | W | D | W | W | D | W | W | D | W | W | W | W | W | L | W | L | W | W | D | L |
| Electricite du Cambodge | L | L | L | L | L | W | D | L | L | D | L | L | L | L | L | L | L | D | W | L | L | L |
| Nagaworld | D | W | W | W | W | W | W | L | W | W | L | W | W | D | W | W | W | W | W | W | W | W |
| National Defense Ministry | W | L | W | W | L | L | L | W | W | W | W | W | W | W | D | W | D | W | D | L | L | W |
| National Police Commissary | W | D | L | W | W | L | W | D | L | W | L | W | L | L | W | D | L | L | L | L | D | L |
| Phnom Penh Crown | W | W | D | L | L | W | D | W | L | D | W | W | L | L | L | W | W | L | W | L | W | W |
| Preah Khan Reach | D | D | W | L | W | L | W | L | L | L | W | L | W | W | D | L | L | W | L | W | W | W |
| Soltilo Angkor | L | L | W | D | L | L | L | W | D | L | L | L | W | W | L | D | D | L | L | L | W | D |
| Visakha | W | W | D | L | W | W | L | W | W | D | W | W | W | W | W | W | L | W | D | W | L | L |
| Western Phnom Penh | L | L | L | L | L | L | L | L | L | L | L | L | L | L | D | L | L | L | L | L | L | L |

W = Win; D = Draw; L = Loss

== Season statistics ==
=== Top scorers ===
| Rank | Player | Club | Goals |
|---|---|---|---|
| 1 | (Nigeria) George Bisan | Nagaworld | 28 |
| 2 | (Cameroon) Befolo Mbarga | Asia Euro United | 27 |
| 3 | (Nigeria) Julius Oiboh | Boeung Ket | 17 |
| 4 | (Brazil) Maycon Calijuri | Boeung Ket | 15 |
| 4 | (Nigeria) Dzarma Bata | Soltilo Angkor | 15 |
| 6 | (Cambodia) Reung Bunheing | National Defense Ministry | 14 |
| 6 | (North Korea) Choe Myong-ho | Visakha | 14 |
| 8 | (Brazil) Valci Júnior | Phnom Penh Crown | 13 |
| 9 | (Nigeria) Mathew Osa | Nagaworld | 12 |
| 10 | (South Korea) Na Hyo-sang | National Defense Ministry | 11 |
| 11 | (Japan) Yudai Ogawa | National Defense Ministry | 10 |
| 11 | (Cambodia) Nub Tola | Preah Khan Reach Svay Rieng | 10 |
| 13 | (Cambodia) Keo Sokpheng | Visakha | 9 |
| 14 | (Trinidad and Tobago) Trevin Caesar | Preah Khan Reach Svay Rieng | 8 |
| 14 | (Japan) Kazuteru Okamoto | Angkor Tiger | 8 |
| 14 | (Cambodia) Noun Borey | National Police Commmissary | 8 |
| 14 | (Japan) Joichiro Sugiyama | Angkor Tiger | 8 |
| 14 | (Cambodia) Mat Noron | Electricite du Cambodge | 8 |
| 19 | (South Africa) Shane Booysen | Preah Khan Reach Svay Rieng | 7 |
| 19 | (South Korea) Song Chi-hun | Defense/Nagaworld | 7 |
| 19 | (Cambodia) Tang Sopheak | Angkor Tiger | 7 |
| 19 | (Cambodia) San Kimheng | Visakha | 7 |

=== Hat-tricks ===
| Player | For | Against | Result | Date | Ref |
|---|---|---|---|---|---|
| (Nigeria) Julius Oiboh | Boeung Ket | Asia Euro United | 4–3 (A) | 3 March 2018 | |
| (Nigeria) George Bisan | Nagaworld | Electricite du Cambodge | 5–1 (A) | 11 March 2018 | |
| (Cambodia) Reung Bunheing | National Defense Ministry | Western Phnom Penh | 8–0 (H) | 8 April 2018 | |
| (Cambodia) Sary Matnorotin | Nagaworld | Soltilo Angkor | 4–1 (H) | 20 May 2018 | |
| (Cameroon) Befolo Mbarga^{6} | Asia Euro United | Western Phnom Penh | 6–1 (H) | 10 June 2018 | |
| (Nigeria) George Bisan^{5} | Nagaworld | Western Phnom Penh | 10–1 (H) | 17 June 2018 | |
| (Nigeria) Mathew Osa^{4} | Nagaworld | Western Phnom Penh | 10–1 (H) | 17 June 2018 | |
| (Trinidad and Tobago) Trevin Caesar | Preah Khan Reach Svay Rieng | Western Phnom Penh | 8–0 (H) | 23 June 2018 | |
| (South Africa) Shane Booysen | Preah Khan Reach Svay Rieng | Western Phnom Penh | 8–0 (H) | 23 June 2018 | |
| (Japan) Joichiro Sugiyama | Angkor Tiger | Electricite du Cambodge | 5–0 (A) | 5 August 2018 | |
| (Brazil) Valci Júnior^{5} | Phnom Penh Crown | Western Phnom Penh | 6–0 (H) | 23 September 2018 | |
| (Cameroon) Befolo Mbarga^{5} | Asia Euro United | Western Phnom Penh | 3–7 (A) | 29 September 2018 | |
| (Cambodia) Reung Bunheing | National Defense | Electricite du Cambodge | 1–9 (A) | 29 September 2018 | |
| (Japan) Yudai Ogawa | National Defense | Electricite du Cambodge | 1–9 (A) | 29 September 2018 | |
| (Nigeria) George Bisan^{4} | Nagaworld | Police Commissary | 6–2 (H) | 29 September 2018 | |
| (Cambodia) Hoy Phallin | Preah Khan Reach | Visakha | 5–4 (H) | 30 September 2018 | |

Note:

- (H) – Home; (A) – Away
- ^{6} player scored 6 goals
- ^{5} player scored 5 goals
- ^{4} player scored 4 goals

== Awards ==
| Awards | Nation/Name | Club |
|---|---|---|
| Top Scorer | (Nigeria) George Bisan | Nagaworld |
| Player of the season | (North Korea) Choe Myong-ho | Visakha |
| Goalkeeper of the season | (Cambodia) Samrith Seiha | Nagaworld |
| Coach of the season | (Cambodia) Meas Channa | Nagaworld |

| Awards | Club |
|---|---|
| Fair Play | Nagaworld |

== See also ==
- 2018 Hun Sen Cup
