= 2020 Cambodian Second League =

Cambodian Second League
- Season: 2020

The 2020 Cambodian Second League will be the third season of Cambodian Second League, the second-tier of Cambodian football. It was first started off in 2016 by the Football Federation of Cambodia. The winners from each of the six regions (North, South, East, West, Middle, and Phnom Penh) from Hun Sen Cup are qualified to play in Cambodian Second League. Winner of the Cambodian Second League will be promoted to the Cambodian League. The season was put on hold due to the COVID-19 pandemic but is set to start again in early July.

== Teams ==
Team	Location	Stadium
ISI Dangkor Senchey	Phnom Penh	KMH Stadium
Koh Kong	Koh Kong Province	Koh Kong Stadium
Kampong Speu	Kampong Speu Province	Kampong Speu Stadium
Phnom Penh Crown U-21	Phnom Penh	Smart RSN Stadium
Prey Veng	Prey Veng Province	Prey Veng Stadium
Rithi Sen	Kampong Chhnang Province	Kampong Chhnang Stadium
Siem Reap	Siem Reap Province	Siem Reap Stadium
Svay Rieng	Svay Rieng Province	Svay Rieng Stadium
Tbong Khmum	Tbong Khmum Province	Tbong Khmum Stadium
TIFFY Army U-21	Phnom Penh	RCAF Old Stadium

== League table ==
Pos	Team	Pld	W	D	L	GF	GA	GD	Pts	Promotion
1	Prey Veng	9	7	2	0	28	6	+22	23	Qualification for 2021 C-League
2	TIFFY Army U-21	9	7	2	0	22	10	+12	23	Qualification for 2021 C-League
3	Phnom Penh Crown U-21	9	5	1	3	20	10	+10	16	Qualification for 2021 C-League
4	ISI Dangkor Senchey	9	5	1	3	10	6	+4	16	Qualification for 2021 C-League
5	Tbong Khmum	9	5	1	3	26	15	+11	16	
6	Siem Reap	9	3	2	4	16	16	0	11	
7	Rithi Sen	9	3	1	5	15	32	−17	10	
8	Koh Kong	9	3	0	6	9	20	−11	9	
9	Svay Rieng	9	1	2	6	20	33	−13	5	
10	Kampong Speu	9	0	0	9	5	30	−25	0	

== See also ==
- 2020 C-League
- 2020 Hun Sen Cup
