= Cambodia national under-23 football team =

Cambodia U23
- Nickname(s): អ្នកចម្បាំងអង្គរ (Angkor Warriors) គោព្រៃកម្ពុជា (Koupreys of Cambodia)
- Association: Football Federation of Cambodia
- Confederation: AFC (Asia)
- Sub-confederation: AFF (Southeast Asia)
- Head coach: Koji Gyotoku
- Captain: Sieng Chanthea
- Home stadium: Phnom Penh Olympic Stadium; Morodok Techo National Stadium
- FIFA code: CAM
First colours	Second colours

First international
- Thailand 7–0 Cambodia (Petaling Jaya, Malaysia; 1 September 2001)

Biggest win
- Cambodia 6–0 Brunei (Phnom Penh, Cambodia; 14 February 2022)

Biggest defeat
- Cambodia 0–9 Oman (Muscat, Oman; 9 April 2003)

Southeast Asian Games
- Appearances: 12 (first in 1961)
- Best result: Fourth place (2019)

The Cambodia national under-23 football team is the under-23 football team representing Cambodia at the Olympic Games, Asian Games, and Southeast Asian Games. It is administered by the Football Federation of Cambodia.

== History ==
In the 2019 SEA Games, under the guidance of coaches Keisuke Honda and Félix Dalmás, they made history by defeating their long-time rivals and 2017 SEA Games silver medalists, Malaysia with score 4-1. This victory allowed them to qualify for the semi-finals for the first time. They ultimately finished in 4th place after a 4-0 loss to the Vietnam.

== Kit ==
The kits used usually follow the senior team's kits. However, they sometimes used kits with different manufacturers. Starting with the 2025 Southeast Asian Games, they will wear Mizuno kits due to Cambodia Olympic Team arrangement.

Provider	Period	Ref
(United States) Nike	2006–2009	
(Thailand) FBT	2010–2022	
(Cambodia) Varaman	2022–2024	
(Japan) Mizuno	2025–	

== Competition records ==
=== Asian Games ===
Champions Runners up Third place Fourth place

Asian Games record
Year	Result	Position	Pld	W	T	L	GF	GA
Senior National Team
1951 to 1998	See Cambodia national football team							
Under-23 National Team
(South Korea) 2002	did not enter							
(Qatar) 2006	did not enter							
(China) 2010	did not enter							
(South Korea) 2014	did not enter							
(Indonesia) 2018	did not enter							
(China) 2022	did not enter							
(Japan) 2026	did not enter							
Total	0/4	-	0	0	0	0	0	0

=== SEA Games Record ===
Champions Runners up Third place Fourth place

SEA Games
Year	Round	GP	W	D	L	GF	GA
(Malaysia) 2001	Group stage	4	0	1	3	0	14
(Vietnam) 2003	Group stage	3	0	0	3	2	19
(Philippines) 2005	Group stage	3	0	0	3	2	10
(Thailand) 2007	Group stage	3	0	0	3	3	17
(Laos) 2009	Group stage	4	1	0	3	5	15
(Indonesia) 2011	Group stage	4	0	0	4	2	15
(Myanmar) 2013	Group stage	4	0	1	3	2	7
(Singapore) 2015	Group stage	4	1	1	2	8	13
(Malaysia) 2017	Group stage	5	0	0	5	2	12
(Philippines) 2019	Fourth place	6	2	2	2	12	10
(Vietnam) 2021	Group stage	4	1	1	2	6	9
(Cambodia) 2023	Group stage	4	1	1	2	6	5
(Thailand) 2025	Withdrew						
(Malaysia) 2027	To be determined						
Total	Best: 4th Place	48	6	7	35	50	146

- Since 2001, Football at the Southeast Asian Games changed into an Under-23 tournament.

== Schedules and results ==
The following is a list of match results in the last 12 months, and future matches that have been scheduled.

Win Draw Lose

== Players ==
=== Current squad ===
The following 23 players were called up for 2025 SEA Games.

No.	Pos.	Player	Date of birth (age)	Caps	Goals	Club
	GK	Chiem Samnang	21 February 2005 (age 21)			(Football Federation of Cambodia) Phnom Penh Crown
	GK	Reth Lyheng	1 January 2004 (age 22)			(Football Federation of Cambodia) Nagaworld
	GK	Mat Lany	9 December 2005 (age 20)			(Football Federation of Cambodia) Royal Cambodian Armed Forces
	DF	Tum Makara	25 January 2006 (age 20)			(Football Federation of Cambodia) Angkor Tiger
	DF	Yang Phumin	22 January 2004 (age 22)			(Football Federation of Cambodia) Royal Cambodian Armed Forces
	DF	Hout Vanneth	12 April 2004 (age 22)			(Football Federation of Cambodia) Nagaworld
	DF	Im Vakhim	28 November 2003 (age 22)			(Football Federation of Cambodia) Angkor Tiger
	DF	Vann Vit	13 October 2003 (age 23)			(Football Federation of Cambodia) Life Sihanoukville
	DF	Phat Sokha	2 March 2003 (age 23)			(Football Federation of Cambodia) Nagaworld
	DF	Leng Nora	19 September 2004 (age 22)			(Football Federation of Cambodia) Visakha
	DF	Sam Ol Tina	19 January 2003 (age 23)			(Football Federation of Cambodia) ISI Dangkor Senchey
	DF	Sonn Thavisiv	2 July 2006 (age 20)			(Football Federation of Cambodia) ISI Dangkor Senchey
	MF	Chhoeun Davin	16 August 2007 (age 19)			(Canadian Soccer Association) York United
	MF	Bong Samuel	25 September 2005 (age 21)			(Football Federation of Cambodia) Phnom Penh Crown
	MF	Sin Sovannmakara	6 December 2004 (age 21)			(Football Federation of Cambodia) Visakha
	MF	Eav Sovannara	1 January 2005 (age 21)			(Football Federation of Cambodia) Boeung Ket
	MF	Khorn Narong	22 July 2003 (age 23)			(Football Federation of Cambodia) Royal Cambodian Armed Forces
	MF	Lim Lucca	14 September 2006 (age 20)			(New Zealand Football) Auckland United
	FW	Voeun Va	7 April 2003 (age 23)			(Football Federation of Cambodia) MOI Kompong Dewa
	FW	Khoan Soben	8 October 2004 (age 22)			(Football Federation of Cambodia) Boeung Ket
	FW	Yem Devit	2 November 2003 (age 23)			(Football Federation of Cambodia) Phnom Penh Crown
	FW	Chanvibol Davit	24 April 2004 (age 22)			(Football Federation of Cambodia) Angkor Tiger
	FW	Hav Soknet	3 August 2003 (age 23)			(Football Federation of Cambodia) ISI Dangkor Senchey

=== Recent call-ups ===
The following players have been called up within the last 12 months.

Pos.	Player	Date of birth (age)	Caps	Goals	Club	Latest call-up
GK	Soeun Rithvirakvathana	14 April 2004 (age 22)			(Cambodia) Visakha	2026 AFC U-23 Asian Cup qualification
DF	Chhin Vennin	25 June 2005 (age 21)			(Cambodia) Phnom Penh Crown	
MF	Sorm Borith	9 April 2005 (age 21)			(Cambodia) Phnom Penh Crown	2026 AFC U-23 Asian Cup qualification
MF	Koeut Pich	15 November 2003 (age 23)			(Cambodia) Phnom Penh Crown	2026 AFC U-23 Asian Cup qualification
MF	Aarun Lim	25 June 2003 (age 23)			(Cambodia) Boeung Ket	2026 AFC U-23 Asian Cup qualification
MF	Chou Sinti	1 April 2003 (age 23)			(Cambodia) Preah Khan Reach Svay Rieng	
FW	Mon Rado	27 January 2004 (age 22)			(Cambodia) Visakha	2026 AFC U-23 Asian Cup qualification
FW	Sovan Dauna	14 February 2004 (age 22)			(Cambodia) Preah Khan Reach Svay Rieng	
^{INJ} Withdrew due to injury^{PRE} Preliminary squad / standby^{RET} Retired from the national team^{SUS} Serving suspension^{WD} Withdrew due to non-injury issue.

== Coaching staff ==
Position	Name
Head coach	(Japan) Koji Gyotoku
Team manager	(Cambodia) Chhouk Piseth
Assistant coach	(Cambodia) Khek Khemrin (Japan) Kento Fujihara
Goalkeeper coach	(Cambodia) Kheng Raksmey
Match analyst	(Cambodia) Kim Leabfong
Doctor	(Cambodia) Lang Sobin
Physiotheraptist	(Cambodia) Seng Borey (Cambodia) Ry Lihour
Interpreter	(Cambodia) Khla Akon
Kit manager	(Cambodia) Lim Seaklay
Team staff	(Cambodia) Son Vuthy (Cambodia) Touch Phanouch

== Honours ==
- BIDC Cup

- Champions (1): 2009

- Southeast Asian Games

- Fourth Place: 2019

- Merlion Cup

- Third Place: 2023

- 2019 AFF U-22 Youth Championship

- Fourth Place: 2019

== See also ==
=== Leagues ===
- Cambodian Premier League
- Cambodian League 2

=== Cups ===
- Hun Sen Cup
- Cambodian League Cup
- Cambodian Super Cup

=== National teams ===
Men

- Cambodia national football team
- Cambodia national under-21 football team
- Cambodia national under-17 football team

Women

- Cambodia women's national football team

Futsal

- Cambodia national futsal team

=== Other ===
- Football in Cambodia
- Cambodian Football Federation
