= Thierry Bin =

Cambodian footballer (born 1991)

Personal information
- Full name: Thierry Chanthacheary Bin
- Date of birth: 1 June 1991 (age 35)
- Place of birth: Villepinte, France
- Height: 1.75 m (5 ft 9 in)
- Positions: Defensive midfielder; centre back

Team information
- Current team: ISI Dangkor Senchey
- Number: 93

Youth career
- –2008: RC Strasbourg

Senior career*
Years	Team	Apps	(Gls)
2008–2009	Brétigny	15	(0)
2010–2012	Saint-Jean-le-Blanc	20	(0)
2012	Aubervilliers	2	(0)
2012–2016	Phnom Penh Crown	54	(9)
2017	Krabi	10	(0)
2017	→ Electricite du Cambodge (loan)	7	(1)
2018–2019	Terengganu	35	(1)
2020	Sukhothai	0	(0)
2020	Perak	8	(1)
2021–2023	Visakha	39	(0)
2023–2026	Svay Rieng	32	(0)
2025–2026	→ Life Sihanoukville (loan)	15	(1)
2026–	ISI Dangkor Senchey	6	(0)

International career^{‡}
2007	France U17	5	(0)
2013	Cambodia U23	8	(0)
2014–	Cambodia	51	(3)
- * Club domestic league appearances and goals as of 10 November 2026 ‡ National team caps and goals as of 26 March 2024

Thierry Chanthacheary Bin (born 1 June 1991) is a professional footballer who plays as a defensive midfielder or a centre back for Cambodian Premier League club ISI Dangkor Senchey. Born in France, he plays for the Cambodia national team.

== Early life ==
Thierry Bin was born in the Paris suburb of Villepinte to Cambodian parents. He acquired French nationality on 6 September 2002, through the collective effect of his parents' naturalization.

== Club career ==
=== Phnom Penh Crown ===
After spending his early years in French football, Thierry returned to his country of origin and signed for Phnom Penh Crown FC, where he would spend the next 4 years and winning 2 league titles.

=== Krabi ===
For 2017 season, Thierry Bin left Phnom Penh Crown and signed a three-year contract with Thai League 2 side Krabi.

=== Terengganu ===
On 5 December 2017, Thierry Bin signed a contract with newly promoted Malaysia Super League club Terengganu.

=== Sukhothai ===
On 4 December 2019, Thierry Bin announced he will be joining Thai League 1 side Sukhothai.

=== Perak ===
Thierry Bin is now a player for Perak FA playing in the Malaysian Super League

== International career ==
Thierry Bin expressed his desire to play for Cambodia early on but he could not make his official debut due to FIFA's guidelines on citizenship. Hence he mostly played in unofficial friendlies instead. In 2013, he was selected for the Cambodia national football team to play at the 2013 Southeast Asian Games.

He played his first national team match on 17 March 2015 in a 2018 World Cup qualifying match against Macau. He also scored the first goal of the match in the 28th minute.

=== International goals ===
Scores and results list Cambodia's goal tally first.

#	Date	Venue	Opponent	Score	Result	Competition
1.	17 March 2015	Estádio Campo Desportivo, Taipa, Macau	Macau	1–0	1–1	2018 FIFA World Cup qualification
2.	29 August 2015	Rajamangala Stadium, Bangkok, Thailand	Laos	1–1	1–2	Friendly
3.	9 October 2016	Olympic Stadium, Phnom Penh, Cambodia	Sri Lanka	2–0	4–0	Friendly

== Personal life ==
He is close friends with Boris Kok and Kouch Dani, two other French Cambodians playing for Phnom Penh Crown.

== Honours ==
Phnom Penh Crown

- Cambodian League: 2014, 2015

Perak FA

- Unity Shield: 2020

Visakha

- Hun Sen Cup: 2021, 2022

Preah Khan Reach Svay Rieng

- Hun Sen Cup: 2023–24
- Cambodian League: 2023–24, 2024–2025, 2025-2026
