= Cambodia national under-17 football team =

Youth association football team

Cambodia Under-16
- Nickname(s): អ្នកចម្បាំងអង្គរ (Angkor Warriors) គោព្រៃកម្ពុជា (Kouprey Kampuchea)
- Association: Football Federation of Cambodia
- Confederation: AFC (Asia)
- Sub-confederation: AFF (Southeast Asia)
- Head coach: Khek Khemrin
- Home stadium: Phnom Penh Olympic Stadium; Morodok Techo National Stadium
- FIFA code: CAM
First colours	Second colours

First international
- Hong Kong 1–1 Cambodia (Bangkok, Thailand; 22 May 2000)

Biggest win
- Cambodia 8-0 Brunei (Naypyidaw, Myanmar; 22 August 2013)

Biggest defeat
- Cambodia 0–11 South Korea (Bangkok; Thailand; 10 March 2007)

FIFA U-17 World Cup
- Appearances: 0

AFC U-16 Championship
- Appearances: 0

AFF U-16 Championship
- Appearances: 8 (first in 2002)
- Best result: 4th place (2016)

The Cambodia national under-16 football team is the national under-16 team of Cambodia and is administered by the Football Federation of Cambodia.

== Competition Records ==
=== AFC U-16 Championship record ===
Note: Variation between under-17 and under-16 tournaments.

- 1985 to 1998: Did Not Enter
- 2000: Did not qualify
- 2002: Did not qualify
- 2004: Did not qualify
- 2006: Did not enter
- 2008: Disqualified
- 2010: Did not qualify
- 2012: Did not qualify
- 2014: Did not enter
- 2016: Did not qualify
- 2018: Did not qualify
- 2020: Did not qualify and cancelled tournament
- 2023: Did not qualify
- 2025: Did not qualify

=== AFF U-16 Championship record ===
Note: 2002 to 2007 competitions were under-17 level tournaments. Variation between under-16 and under-15 tournaments after 2007.

- 2002: Group stage
- 2005: Group stage
- 2006: Did not enter
- 2007: Group stage
- 2008: Did not enter
- 2009: Canceled
- 2010: Did not enter
- 2011: Group stage
- 2012: Did not enter
- 2013: Group stage
- 2014: Cancelled
- 2015: Group stage
- 2016: Fourth place
- 2017: Group stage
- 2018: Group stage
- 2019: Group stage
- 2022: Group stage
- 2024: Group stage

== Results and fixtures ==
The following is a list of match results in the last 12 months, as well as any future matches that have been scheduled.

Win Draw Lose

=== 2025 ===
22 November 2026 AFC U-17 Asian Cup qualification	Cambodia	1–3	Pakistan	Bishkek, Kyrgyzstan
19:00 UTC+6	Pimakara Pov 39' (pen.)	Report	Abdullah 35'; Abdul Samad 71'; Yasir 90+2'	Stadium: Dolen Omurzakov Stadium; Referee: Ahmad Al-Khalifa (Syria)

24 November 2026 AFC U-17 Asian Cup qualification	Laos	5–1	Cambodia	Besh-Kungoy, Kyrgyzstan
15:00 UTC+6	Sitthilath; Phoutphatai 41'; Odin 50', 69'; Anousith 62'	Report	Pimakara Pov 43' (pen.)	Stadium: Dostuk Arena; Referee: Mohammed Murad Al-Balushi (Oman)

26 November 2026 AFC U-17 Asian Cup qualification	Yemen	3-0	Cambodia	Besh-Kungoy, Kyrgyzstan
15:00 UTC+6	Al-Wesabi 18'; Al-Qufaili 83'; A. Basheer 90'	Report		Stadium: Dostuk Arena; Referee: Yūsuke Ohashi (Japan)

28 November 2026 AFC U-17 Asian Cup qualification	Cambodia	5-1	Guam	Bishkek, Kyrgyzstan
15:00 UTC+6	Chantha Seyha 36', 90+6'; Be Cheaming 64'; Ly Sok Kryya 68'; Thy Vutty 76'	Report	Sokheang 64' (o.g.)	Stadium: Dolen Omurzakov Stadium; Referee: Saif Kamal Aisha (Palestine)

30 November 2026 AFC U-17 Asian Cup qualification	Kyrgyzstan	3-0	Cambodia	Bishkek, Kyrgyzstan
15:00 UTC+6	Abilov 27'; Mirlanov 89'; Abdyraev 90+2'	Report		Stadium: Dolen Omurzakov Stadium; Referee: Layth Farhan Faraj (Iraq)

=== 2026 (U-15) ===
24 October 2026 FIFA U-15 World Cup & Festival	Zimbabwe	3-2	Cambodia	Baku, Azerbaijan
09:00 UTC+4	Tombo 5', 32'; Adam 28'	Report	Sokhory 4'; Lamchhit 22'	Stadium: Hövsan Competition Complex

25 October 2026 FIFA U-15 World Cup & Festival	Nicaragua	4-1	Cambodia	Baku, Azerbaijan
14:30 UTC+4	Jarib 2', 17'; Juan 27'; Kendal 34' (pen.)	Report	Titpanhapich 40'	Stadium: Hövsan Competition Complex

25 October 2026 FIFA U-15 World Cup & Festival	Cambodia	0-10	England	Baku, Azerbaijan
20:45 UTC+4		Report	Famokun 1'; Allen 5'; Bonnick 15', 22'; McLoughlin 23', 35', 40'; Charles 30', 33'; Livesey 34'	Stadium: Hövsan Competition Complex

26 October 2026 FIFA U-15 World Cup & Festival	Cambodia	0-3	Montenegro	Baku, Azerbaijan
14:30 UTC+4		Report	Colevic 21', 37'; Vesovic 29'	Stadium: Hövsan Competition Complex

26 October 2026 FIFA U-15 World Cup & Festival	Republic of Ireland	4-1	Cambodia	Baku, Azerbaijan
20:45 UTC+4	Hudson 24' (pen.), 31'; Power 30'; Rehill 40'	Report	? 15'	Stadium: Hövsan Competition Complex

28 October 2026 FIFA U-15 World Cup & Festival	Cambodia	2-3	Ethiopia	Baku, Azerbaijan
09:00 UTC+4		Report		Stadium: Hövsan Competition Complex

28 October 2026 FIFA U-15 World Cup & Festival	Cambodia	1-1 (3–4 p)	Cayman Islands	Baku, Azerbaijan
15:45 UTC+4		Report		Stadium: Hövsan Competition Complex

29 October 2026 FIFA U-15 World Cup & Festival	Cambodia	4-1	Anguilla	Baku, Azerbaijan
20:45 UTC+4		Report		Stadium: Hövsan Competition Complex

30 October 2026 FIFA U-15 World Cup & Festival	Tonga	1-7	Cambodia	Baku, Azerbaijan
12:45 UTC+4		Report		Stadium: Hövsan Competition Complex

=== (U-17) ===
8 November 2027 AFC U-17 Asian Cup qualification	Cambodia	v	Philippines	Yangon, Myanmar
15:00 +06:30				Stadium: Padaythar Stadium

11 November 2027 AFC U-17 Asian Cup qualification	Cambodia	v	Afghanistan	Thanlyin, Myanmar
15:00 +06:30				Stadium: Starcity Sports Club

14 November 2027 AFC U-17 Asian Cup qualification	Indonesia	v	Cambodia	Thanlyin, Myanmar
15:00 +06:30				Stadium: Starcity Sports Club

17 November 2027 AFC U-17 Asian Cup qualification	Myanmar	v	Cambodia	Thanlyin, Myanmar
15:00 +06:30				Stadium: Starcity Sports Club

== Coaching staff ==
Position	Name
Head Coach	(Cambodia) Khek Khemrin
Team manager	(Cambodia) Chhouk Piseth
Assistant coach	(Cambodia) Son Sopanha (Cambodia) Tieng Tiny
Goalkeeper coach	(Cambodia) Sereyrath Um
Fitness coach	(Cambodia) Yorm Vanna
Kit manager	(Cambodia) Lim Chanmonyoudom
Match analyst	(Cambodia) Kun Sakrovy
Doctor	(Cambodia) Lang Sobin
Physiotherapist	(Cambodia) Seng Borey

== Players ==
=== Current squad ===
The following 23 players were selected for the 2026 AFC U-17 Asian Cup qualification.

No.	Pos.	Player	Date of birth (age)	Club
1	GK	Reaksa Mout		(Football Federation of Cambodia) Visakha
21	GK	Chhea Vuthy		(Football Federation of Cambodia) Bati Academy
22	GK	Vichka Mon		(Football Federation of Cambodia) Angkor Tiger
2	DF	Vatta Khat		(Football Federation of Cambodia) Bati Academy
3	DF	Vonphumea Ly		(Football Federation of Cambodia) Bati Academy
4	DF	Chanra Chorn		(Football Federation of Cambodia) Bati Academy
5	DF	Kovan Choeun		(Football Federation of Cambodia) Bati Academy
12	DF	Sok Kryya Ly		(Football Federation of Cambodia) Visakha
13	DF	Seito Ito		(Football Federation of Cambodia) Siem Reap United
14	DF	Sokheang Mao		(Football Federation of Cambodia) Visakha
6	MF	Horhong Chhai		(Football Federation of Cambodia) Royal Cambodian Armed Forces
7	MF	Pov Boty		(Football Federation of Cambodia) Bati Academy
8	MF	Sokheng Chhean		(Football Federation of Cambodia) Phnom Penh Crown
10	MF	El Hanafi		(Football Federation of Cambodia) ISI Dangkor Senchey
11	MF	Vinhav Lor		(Football Federation of Cambodia) Royal Cambodian Armed Forces
15	MF	July Bunna		(Football Federation of Cambodia) Phnom Penh Crown
16	MF	Cheaming Be		(Football Federation of Cambodia) Phnom Penh Crown
17	MF	Vutty Thy		(Football Federation of Cambodia) Visakha
18	MF	Arafin Savann		(Football Federation of Cambodia) Visakha
20	MF	Odom Chhouk		(Football Federation of Cambodia) Visakha
23	MF	Samnang Phaen		(Football Federation of Cambodia) Visakha
9	FW	Pov Pimakara (captain)		(Football Federation of Cambodia) Visakha
19	FW	Seyha Chantha		(Football Federation of Cambodia) Visakha

== Honour ==
- AFF U-16 Youth Championship
  - Fourth Place:2016

== See also ==
=== Leagues ===
- Cambodian Premier League
- Cambodian League 2

=== Cups ===
- Hun Sen Cup
- Cambodian League Cup
- Cambodian Super Cup

=== National teams ===
Men

- Cambodia national football team
- Cambodia national under-23 football team
- Cambodia national under-21 football team

Women

- Cambodia women's national football team

Futsal

- Cambodia national futsal team

=== Other ===
- Football in Cambodia
- Cambodian Football Federation
