= Chiem Samnang =

Cambodian footballer

Personal information
- Full name: Chiem Samnang
- Date of birth: 21 February 2005 (age 21)
- Place of birth: Pursat, Cambodia
- Height: 1.80 m (5 ft 11 in)
- Position: Goalkeeper

Team information
- Current team: Phnom Penh Crown
- Number: 1

Youth career
- 2020–2023: Bati Academy

Senior career*
Years	Team	Apps	(Gls)
2023–	Phnom Penh Crown	22	(0)
- * Club domestic league appearances and goals as of 9 November 2026 (UTC)

Chiem Samnang (born 21 February 2005) is a Cambodian professional footballer who plays as a goalkeeper for Cambodian Premier League club Phnom Penh Crown.

== Career ==
=== Phnom Penh Crown ===
Samnang made his senior club debut in a 2025-26 Cambodian Premier League match against Life Sihanoukvill on 14 September 2025.

== International career ==
Samnang was called up for Cambodia U19 to compete in 2022 AFF U-19 Youth Championship.

In 2025, he was called up for Cambodia U22 for 2025 SEA Games but later withdrew due to Cambodian-Thai border conflict.

== Honours ==
Phnom Penh Crown

- Hun Sen Cup: 2024–25
