= Bruno Krenkel =

Brazilian football player (born 1998)

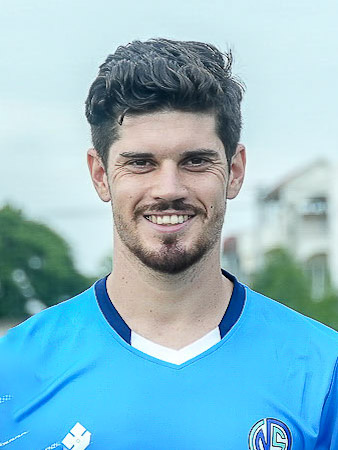
- Bruno Krenkel playing for Next Step FC

Personal information
- Full name: Bruno Wellyngton Krenkel
- Date of birth: 12 December 1998 (age 27)
- Place of birth: Ibirama, Santa Catarina, Brazil
- Height: 1.71 m (5 ft 7 in)
- Position: Forward

Team information
- Current team: Lion King
- Number: 27

Youth career
- 2012: Atlético Ibirama

Senior career*
Years	Team	Apps	(Gls)
2018-19	Żejtun Corinthians		
2018	Nação Esportes		
2020-21	Trinidade A.D		
2021	Thawi Watthana Samut Sakhon United		
2022-24	Angkor City	33	(13)
2024–25	Davao Aguilas	3	(0)
2025–	Lion King		
- * Club domestic league appearances and goals

Bruno Wellyngton Krenkel (born 12 December 1998), known as Bruno Krenkel, is a Brazilian professional footballer who plays as a forward for Cambodian League 2 team Lion King.

== Playing career ==
Krenkel spent his youth career at Atlético Ibirama in Brazil.

In 2018, the Brazilian joined his first professional club, Żejtun Corinthians in the Maltese Challenge League.

Returning to Brazil in 2020, he was part of the Nação Esportes side that finished runners-up in the Campeonato Catarinense Série C, earning promotion to Série B.

In 2020, he signed for Trindade A.D in Campeonato Pernambucano Série A2.

Following a brief spell in Thai League 3 with Thawi Watthana Samut Sakhon United in 2021, Krenkel joined Next Step FC in Cambodia League 2 in 2022.

=== Next Step FC/Angkor City ===
==== 2022 season: Debut season in Cambodia ====
On 5 February 2022, Krenkel signed for Cambodia League 2 side Next Step FC, ahead of the club's first professional season.

His 42nd-minute goal ensured Next Step's victory in their opening game of the campaign, edging Bati Academy 1–0 at Svay Thom Stadium on 6 March 2022.

The Brazilian's wondergoal against Prey Veng on 17 July went viral, garnering millions of views across social media platforms and received attention worldwide.

A clip of his audacious strike even reached Neymar, who reacted to Krenkel's finish as part of 433's Rate These Skills series.

Krenkel registered ten goals and one assist in his first season in Cambodia, also earning Player of the Match twice.

Ahead of the 2023 season, Krenkel featured in one match for Next Step in the Desportal Pre-season Cup. Scoring a hat-trick and logging one assist, he was named Player of the Match.

On 27 June 2023, Next Step FC club president Mao Savin officially announced that the club had rebranded to Angkor City ahead of the 2023 season.

==== 2023 season: Krenkel extends contract with Angkor City ====
On 16 September 2023, Krenkel clipped in a neat near-post finish to ensure Angkor City claimed an away point against Life FC in a 1–1 draw on the opening day of the 2023 Cambodia League 2 season.

He scored his second goal of the campaign on 23 September in a 3–2 defeat to National Football Academy.

Krenkel converted from the penalty spot against ISI Dangkor Senchey Academy on 20 October.

=== Davao Aguilas ===
Krenkel made his Davao Aguilas debut on 6 October 2024, coming on as a substitute in the second half of a 1–1 draw with Kaya F.C in the Philippines Football League.

=== Lion King ===
Krenkel joined Lion King ahead of the 2025/26 Cambodian League 2 season. He made two appearances in the 2024/25 Hun Sen Cup in a two-legged round of 16 tie against Visakha FC. On 29 June 2025, it was announced Krenkel had extended his contract with the club.

== Career statistics ==
=== Club ===
As of match played 10 September 2025

Appearances and goals by club, season, and competition
Club	Season	League			Cup		Total	
Club	Season	Division	Apps	Goals	Apps	Goals	Apps	Goals
Angkor City	2022	Cambodia League 2	22	10	—	—	22	10
Angkor City	2023-24	Cambodia League 2	11	3	2	0	13	3
Davao Aguilas	2024-25	Philippines Football League	3		—	—	3	
Lion King	2024-25	Cambodia League 2	—	—	2	0	2	0
Lion King	2025-26	Cambodia League 2	1	1	8	6	9	7
