= Chea Chandara =

Cambodian footballer (born 1999)

Personal information
- Full name: Chea Chandara
- Date of birth: 5 August 1999 (age 27)
- Place of birth: Battambang, Cambodia
- Height: 1.83 m (6 ft 0 in)
- Position: Centre-back

Youth career
- 2014–2016: Phnom Penh Crown

Senior career*
Years	Team	Apps	(Gls)
2016–2020	Phnom Penh Crown		
2021–2022	Soltilo Angkor		
2023	ISI Dangkor Senchey	3	(0)
2023–2025	Nagaworld	40	(2)
2025–2026	ISI Dangkor Senchey	13	(0)

International career^{‡}
2016	Cambodia U19	2	(0)
2023–	Cambodia	4	(0)
- * Club domestic league appearances and goals as of 23 March 2026 ‡ National team caps and goals as of 23 January 2026

Chea Chandara (born 5 August 1999) is a Cambodian professional footballer who plays as a Centre-back for Cambodian Premier League club ISI Dangkor Senchey.

== Career ==
Chandara was promoted to the Phnom Penh Crown senior team in 2016 and left the club at the end of 2020 season.

He signed for ISI Dangkor Senchey in 2023.

== International career ==
Chandara was first called up for the Cambodia national football team in a friendly match against Qatar on 31 December 2023. He made his official senior debut in 2024 FIFA Series match against Equatorial Guinea on 22 March 2024. Later he was called up for friendly match against Mongolia on 11 June 2024.

== Career statistics ==
As of match played 11 June 2024

Appearances and goals by national team and year
National team	Year	Apps	Goals
Cambodia	2023	1	0
Cambodia	2024	3	0
Total		4	0
