= Cambodian Women's League =

Football competition in Cambodia

- Organising body: Football Federation of Cambodia
- Country: Cambodia
- Confederation: AFC (Asia)
- Number of clubs: 10
- Level on pyramid: 1
- International cup: AFC Women's Champions League
- Current champions: Phnom Penh Crown (2025)
- Top scorer: Soeurn Vipha (70 goals)
- Current: 2026 Cambodian Women's League

The Cambodian Women's League (Khmer: លីគបាល់ទាត់នារីកម្ពុជា) is Cambodia's main women's football competition, run by the Football Federation of Cambodia (FFC). It features 10 teams as of 2024.

== History ==
Prior to the start of the 2020 season, the federation raised the prize money for the top three positions. In July 2024, the Football Federation of Cambodia announced the return of the Women's Football League after a two-year hiatus.

== Competition format ==
The season, usually contested from August to February, had been divided into two stages.

1. The first stage follows a two-round league format, with each team playing both home and away matches. The top four teams shall advance to the second stage.
2. In the second stage, the teams compete to determine the champions.

== Current teams ==
The current ten teams of the 2024–25 Cambodian Women's League:

Team	Location	Stadium
Boeung Ket	Phnom Penh	Hi-Tech BK Training Ground
Nagaworld	Kampong Speu province	Nagaworld Stadium
Kampong Chhnang	Kampong Chhnang province	Kampong Chhnang Pitch
Kampong Thom	Kampong Thom province	K.P Thom Provincial Academy Pitch
MR-Leng	Kandal province	Mr Leng Stadium
Phnom Penh Crown	Phnom Penh	RSN Stadium
PKR Svay Rieng	Svay Rieng province	Preah Khan Reach Svay Rieng Stadium
SALT Academy	Battambang province	Salt Academy Battambang Pitch
Siem Reap	Siem Reap province	Siem Reap Stadium
Visakha	Phnom Penh	Visakha Training Center

== Champions ==
Season	Champion	Runner-up	Ref.
2020	Nagaworld; PKR Svay Rieng (Note: Title Shared After Final Between Nagaworld and PKR Svay Rieng Cancelled Due to COVID-19 pandemic)	—N/a	
2021	Phnom Penh Crown	Nagaworld	
No competition held from 2022 to 2024			
2024–25	Phnom Penh Crown	Visakha	
2025	Phnom Penh Crown	Visakha	

== Top scorers ==
Season	Player	Team	Goals
2016	(Cambodia) Lim Sochea	Svay Rieng	23
2020	Not Awarded		
2021	(Cambodia) Ban Cheavey	Phnom Penh Crown	35
2024–25	(Cambodia) Sim Maisom	Visakha	43
2025	(Cambodia) Soeurn Vipha	Phnom Penh Crown	39
2026	(Cambodia) Sim Maisom	Visakha	30

== See also ==
- Football in Cambodia
