= David Koum =

Cameroonian footballer (born 1996)

Personal information
- Full name: David Julien William Koum
- Date of birth: 2 August 1996 (age 30)
- Place of birth: Douala, Cameroon
- Height: 1.70 m (5 ft 7 in)
- Position: Central midfielder

Team information
- Current team: Aguilas–UMak
- Number: 79

Youth career
- 2013–2017: Real Academy de Douala

Senior career*
Years	Team	Apps	(Gls)
2018–2019	Mawyawadi		
2019–2020	Asia Euro United		
2020–2023	Kirivong Sok Sen Chey	19	(3)
2023	Muang Loei United		
2023–2024	Siem Reap		
2024–2025	Thimphu City	5	(1)
2025	ISI Dangkor Senchey	12	(1)
2025–	Aguilas–UMak	19	(1)
- * Club domestic league appearances and goals as of 7:54, 29 May 2026 (UTC)

David Julien William Koum (born 2 August 1996) is a Cameroonian professional footballer who plays as a central midfielder for Philippines Football League side Aguilas–UMak, whom he co-captains.

== Club career ==
=== Early professional career ===
Koum was born in the city of Douala, Cameroon. Up until age 21, he played youth football for Real Academy de Douala before making his first professional move abroad with Mawyawadi of Myanmar.

In 2023, Koum signed for Muang Loei of the Thai League 3. In 2024, he had a short stint at Bhutanese club Thimphu City, making his debut against Daga United. He scored his first goal in a dominant win over Tsirang FC.

=== Career in Cambodia ===
In 2019, Koum signed with Asia Euro United of the then-named C League of Cambodia. A year later, during the COVID-19 pandemic, he made a move to Kirivong, where he made 19 appearances and scored 3 goals. After a brief stint in Thailand, he rejoined the league signing with Siem Reap. After another short stint abroad, he returned to Cambodia to sign with ISI Dangkor Senchey, scoring once in 12 games.

=== Philippines ===
In mid-2025, Koum signed with Aguilas–UMak of the Philippines Football League. He was named co-captain of the team, which he shared with fellow midfielder Arnel Amita. He made his debut in a loss against Kaya–Iloilo. To date he has scored 1 goal in 18 games, scoring in a win over Don Bosco Garelli while also providing a crucial assist in the club's revenge win over Kaya.
