= Sieng Chanthea =

Cambodian footballer

Personal information
- Full name: Sieng Chanthea
- Date of birth: 9 September 2002 (age 24)
- Place of birth: Koh Kong, Cambodia
- Height: 1.65 m (5 ft 5 in)
- Positions: Forward; winger

Team information
- Current team: Preah Khan Reach Svay Rieng
- Number: 9

Youth career
- 2016–2019: Bati Academy

Senior career*
Years	Team	Apps	(Gls)
2020–2025	Boeung Ket	68	(36)
2023–2024	→ Al Shahaniya (loan)	7	(0)
2025–	Preah Khan Reach Svay Rieng	34	(5)

International career^{‡}
2016–2019	Cambodia U17		
2019	Cambodia U19		
2019–2023	Cambodia U22		
2019–2023	Cambodia U23		
2019–	Cambodia	51	(9)
Medal record
Men's football
Representing Cambodia
FIFA ASEAN Challenge Cup
Runner-up	2026 Hong Kong
- * Club domestic league appearances and goals as of 9 November 2026 ‡ National team caps and goals as of 5 October 2026

Sieng Chanthea (Khmer: សៀង ចន្ធា: born 9 September 2002) is a Cambodian professional footballer who plays as a forward or a winger for Preah Khan Reach Svay Rieng and the Cambodia national team. He made his senior debut in a 2–0 victory against Pakistan in the 2022 FIFA World Cup qualification on 6 June 2019, becoming the youngest player to score for Cambodia and in a FIFA World Cup qualification match at the age of 16 years old.

== Club career ==
=== Bati Academy ===
Chanthea is a product of the Football Federation of Cambodia's academy, Bati Academy.

=== Boeung Ket ===
After an impressive display for his country, on 12 December 2019, it was announced that Chanthea would be joining Cambodian League side Boeung Ket starting in the 2020 season.

==== Al Shahaniya SC (loan) ====
Chanthea became the first Cambodian Player to join a Qatari Football Club. He joined Al Shahaniya on loan from Boeung Ket Angkor. He scored one goal in the league, before returning to his original club just after 6 months.

== International career ==
Chanthea has represented Cambodia national football team in multiple youth and senior levels. He made his senior debut in the 2–0 win against Pakistan on 6 June 2019 where he also scored his first goal as a senior player after coming on as a substitute in the 81st minute.

On 10 December 2019, Chanthea scored the fastest goal in the history of Southeast Asian Games. The goal was scored within 18 seconds of the start of the match against Myanmar whose marauding run ended with the ball finding the back of the net.

On 27 March 2024, Chanthea became the first Cambodian player to score against CONCACAF opponent, Guyana during the 2024 FIFA Series.

== International goals ==
=== National team ===
No.	Date	Venue	Opponent	Score	Result	Competition
1.	6 June 2019	Phnom Penh Olympic Stadium, Phnom Penh, Cambodia	Pakistan	1–0	2–0	2022 FIFA World Cup qualification
2.	15 December 2021	Bishan Stadium, Bishan, Singapore	Laos	3–0	3–0	2020 AFF Championship
3.	2 January 2023	Thammasat Stadium, Pathum Thani, Thailand	Thailand	1–2	1–3	2022 AFF Championship
4.	11 September 2023	Phnom Penh Olympic Stadium, Phnom Penh, Cambodia	Macau	1–0	4–0	Friendly
5.	11 September 2023	Phnom Penh Olympic Stadium, Phnom Penh, Cambodia	Macau	2–0	4–0	Friendly
6.	26 March 2024	Prince Abdullah Al-Faisal Sports City, Jeddah, Saudi Arabia	Guyana	1–1	1–4	2024 FIFA Series
7.	11 June 2024	Phnom Penh Olympic Stadium, Phnom Penh, Cambodia	Chinese Taipei	2–1	3–2	Friendly
8.	11 December 2024	National Stadium, Kallang, Singapore	Singapore	1–2	1–2	2024 ASEAN Championship
9.	9 June 2026	Phnom Penh Olympic Stadium, Phnom Penh, Cambodia	Hong Kong	2–0	2–0	Friendly

== Honours ==
Individual

- AFF U-16 Youth Championship top scorer: 2017
