= Touch Pancharong =

Cambodian footballer (born 1990)

Touch Pancharong ទូច បញ្ចរ៉ុង
Personal information
- Date of birth: 5 March 1990 (age 36)
- Place of birth: Koh Kong, Cambodia
- Height: 1.67 m (5 ft 6 in)
- Position: Defender

Youth career
- 2008: Koh Kong

Senior career*
Years	Team	Apps	(Gls)
2008–2009	Dolphin FC		
2009–2010	Phnom Penh Crown		
2010–2011	National Police Commissary		
2011–2020	Boeung Ket		
2021–2023	Koh Kong	25	(0)

International career
2009–2010	Cambodia U19	3	(0)
2009–2013	Cambodia U23	9	(0)
2011–2014	Cambodia	16	(0)
- * Club domestic league appearances and goals

Touch Pancharong (born 5 March 1990) is a Cambodian former footballer who used to play for home town club Koh Kong in Cambodian Second League.

He has represented Cambodia at senior international level.

== Honours ==
=== Club ===
Phnom Penh Crown

- Cambodian League: 2010

Boeung Ket Angkor

- Cambodian League: 2012.2016.2017
- 2015 Mekong Club Championship: Runner up
