= Kazunori Ohara =

Japanese football manager

Personal information
- Full name: Kazunori Ohara
- Date of birth: 5 July 1972 (age 54)
- Place of birth: Japan

Managerial career
- Years: Team
- 2012–2014: Bhutan
- 2015: Cambodia
- 2016–2019: Cambodia U19

Kazunori Ohara (小原 一典, Ohara Kazunori; born 5 July 1972) is a Japanese football manager of Cambodia national under-20 football team. He was the manager of the Bhutan national football team from 2012 to 2014.

He became technical director of the Football Federation of Cambodia before taking over as Cambodia national team manager in 2015. The start of the 2018 FIFA World Cup qualification – AFC second round was difficult as Cambodia lost big to Singapore, and Ohara could not settle with a squad right away.

He left the Football Federation of Cambodia in January 2024, and was replaced as technical director by another Japanese, Shigeaki Ichikawa.
