= Life FC =

Cambodian football club

Life Football Club; សមាគមក្លឹបបាល់ទាត់ ឡាយហ្វ ខេត្តព្រះសីហនុ
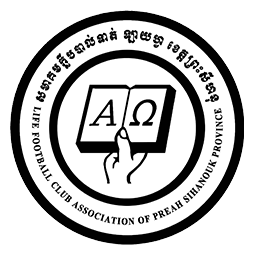
- Full name: Life Football Club Association of Preah Sihanouk Province
- Founded: 2023; 3 years ago
- Ground: Life FC Stadium, Sihanoukville
- Capacity: 3,000
- Head coach: Arthur Ferreira
- League: Cambodian Premier League
- 2025–26: Cambodian Premier League, 10th of 11
- Website: lifefootballclub.com
Home colours	Away colours	Third colours

Life Football Club is a professional football club based in Sihanoukville, Preah Sihanouk province, Cambodia. It plays in the Cambodian Premier League in 2024–25 season following promotion from the second division.

== History ==
In 2023, Life FC became the first Sihanoukville club to play in Cambodian League 2 after being confirmed by the Cambodian Premier League company. The team played its first league game on 16 September 2023, drawing 1–1 against Angkor City. Life was crowned champion of the second division on 31 March 2024, after drawing 4–4 against 2nd place Ministry of Interior FA, though tied on point, it had a better head-to-head record. After a tight season, both Life and the Ministry of Interior got promoted to play in Cambodian Premier League for the 2024–25 season, with Life becoming the first club from Preah Sihanouk to play in the country's top football division.

Life played their first Cambodian Premier League game on 11 August 2024, losing 1–0 to ISI Dangkor Senchey. After 7 games without a win, Sovannara resigned leading to the appointment of Jörg Steinebrunner as the new head coach. On 9 November 2024, Life won their first top-flight game, beating ISI Dangkor Senchey 1-0 in the second round of the regular season. They went on to win 3 more games throughout the season, placing them in 10th position, the second to last position in the table.

== Current squad ==
As of 19 October 2026

Note: Flags indicate national team as defined under FIFA eligibility rules; some limited exceptions apply. Players may hold more than one non-FIFA nationality.

No.	Pos.	Nation	Player
1	GK	BRA	João Manoel
2	DF	CAM	Ouk Som Eng
4	DF	BRA	Cleberson Victor
5	DF	CAM	Mean Vicheka
6	DF	CAM	Choung Makara
7	FW	BRA	André Ferreira
8	MF	SRB	Nemanja Krusevac
9	FW	CAM	Khem Langkhe
10	MF	CAM	Teath Kimheng
11	FW	BRA	Lucas Serra
12	MF	CAM	Kour Sopheak
13	MF	JPN	Kanta Asami (Captain)
17	FW	CAM	Kea Piseth
21	MF	CAM	Sean Sopheaktra

No.	Pos.	Nation	Player
22	GK	CAM	Ron Chongmieng
25	GK	CAM	Say Chantola
27	MF	CAM	Hak Vuthy
30	MF	CAM	Chan Meta
34	MF	CAM	Mon Soktikun
36	DF	CAM	Vi Chandara
40	DF	CAM	Phem Taosinh
47	MF	CAM	David Malis
66	DF	CAM	Vann Vit
72	DF	CAM	Pok Roza
77	FW	CAM	Nat Neth
88	MF	CAM	Le Songpov
99	FW	BRA	Bruno Ernandes

== Coaching staff ==
Position	Name
Head coach	(Brazil) Arthur Ferreira
Assistant coach	(Cambodia) Khun Phearo (Cambodia) Mong Sok (Cambodia) Phanny Chamroeun (Cambodia) At Chanra
General manager	(Cambodia) Kak Mesa
Goalkeeper coach	(Brazil) Luan Pires
Fitness coach	(Cambodia) Sam Monirothana
Video analyst	(Cambodia) Pheng Chayheang
Physiotherapist	(Cambodia) Ly Piseth

== Honours ==
- Cambodian League 2
  - Champions (1): 2023–24
