= Sath Rosib =

Cambodian footballer (born 1997)

Personal information
- Date of birth: 7 July 1997 (age 29)
- Place of birth: Phnom Penh, Cambodia
- Height: 1.66 m (5 ft 5 in)
- Position: Left-back

Team information
- Current team: ISI Dangkor Senchey
- Number: 17

Senior career*
Years	Team	Apps	(Gls)
2014–2016	Nagaworld		
2016–2022	Boeung Ket		
2023–2026	Preah Khan Reach Svay Rieng	41	(0)
2025–2026	→ Boeung Ket (loan)	6	(0)
2026–	ISI Dangkor Senchey	6	(0)

International career^{‡}
2016	Cambodia U19		
2018–2019	Cambodia U23		
2019–	Cambodia	23	(2)
- * Club domestic league appearances and goals as of 10 November 2026 ‡ National team caps and goals as of 10 October 2018

Sath Rosib (Khmer: សាត រ៉ូស៊ីប born 7 July 1997) is a Cambodian professional footballer who plays as a left-back for Cambodian Premier League club ISI Dangkor Senchey and the Cambodia national team.

== Club career ==
Rosib made his senior debut in the Cambodian League in 2016 for Boeung Ket.

On 3 January 2023, Rosib was announced as a new player for Preah Khan Reach Svay Rieng.

== International career ==
He made his debut in a friendly match against Laos national football team on 21 March 2018.

=== International goals ===
Scores and results list Cambodia's goal tally first.

No.	Date	Venue	Opponent	Score	Result	Competition
1.	11 June 2019	Hamad bin Khalifa Stadium, Doha, Qatar	Pakistan	1–1	2–1	2022 FIFA World Cup qualification
2.	6 December 2021	Bishan Stadium, Bishan, Singapore	Malaysia	1–3	1–3	2020 AFF Championship

== Honours ==
=== Club ===
Boeung Ket

- Cambodian League: 2017
