= Rory Grand =

English footballer (born 1986)

Personal information
- Full name: Rory Dennis Thomas Grand
- Date of birth: 15 March 1986 (age 40)
- Place of birth: Solihull, England
- Position: Goalkeeper

Senior career*
Years	Team	Apps	(Gls)
2004–2006	Solihull Moors		
2006–2007	Rushall Olympic		
2007–2008	Samut Prakan		
- * Club domestic league appearances and goals

Rory Dennis Thomas Grand (born 15 March 1986) is an English football coach and former player who played as a goalkeeper.
