= Samuel Ajayi =

Nigerian footballer (born 1987)

Personal information
- Full name: Samuel Gbenga Ajayi
- Date of birth: 2 July 1987 (age 39)
- Place of birth: Lagos, Nigeria
- Height: 1.74 m (5 ft 9 in)
- Position: Forward

Senior career*
Years	Team	Apps	(Gls)
2002–2005	Niger Tornadoes	23	(13)
2006–2008	Phnom Penh Crown	42	(39)
2008–2012	Bangkok Glass	94	(30)
2013–2014	Chonburi	19	(3)
2014–2015	Samut Songkhram	24	(6)
2015–2016	Boeung Ket	38	(14)
2017	Asia Euro United	9	(4)
2017–2019	Boeung Ket		
2020–2022	Asia Euro United	23	(7)
2023	Koh Kong		
- * Club domestic league appearances and goals as of 28 June 2008

Samuel Gbenga Ajayi (born 2 July 1987) is a Nigerian former professional footballer who last played as a forward for Koh Kong in the Cambodian League 2.

== Career ==
Ajayi was born in Lagos. He previously played for Cambodian team Phnom Penh Empire where he was noticed by the 'Bankers' playing in the Singapore Cup.

== Honours ==
- 2008 Hun Sen Cup
- 2009 Super Cup
- 2010 Queen's Cup
- 2015 Mekong Club Championship: Runner up
- 2016 Cambodian League
- 2017 Cambodian League
