= Kento Fujihara =

Japanese footballer (born 1992)

Personal information
- Date of birth: January 29, 1992 (age 34)
- Place of birth: Kanagawa, Japan
- Height: 1.80 m (5 ft 11 in)
- Position: Defender

Team information
- Current team: Cambodia; Nagaworld FC (assistant)

Youth career
- 2007–2009: Fujieda Meisei High School

College career
Years	Team	Apps	(Gls)
2010–2013	Kansai University		

Senior career*
Years	Team	Apps	(Gls)
2014–2016	Albirex Niigata Singapore F.C.	98	(2)
2017	Nagaworld	21	(1)
2018–2020	Soltilo Angkor	23	(1)
2022	ISI Dangkor Senchey	19	(2)
2023	Angkor City		
- * Club domestic league appearances and goals

Kento Fujihara (藤原賢土, Fujihara Kento; born Jan 29, 1992) is a Japanese football coach and former player.

He was educated at and played for Kansai University, before moving to Singapore. He signed for Albirex Niigata Singapore F.C. from the S.League in 2014 and played for 3 years with the team. In 2017, he moved on to Cambodia to play for Nagaworld FC.

== Club career statistics ==
As of Jan 2, 2017

Club performance			League		Cup		League Cup		Total	
Season	Club	League	Apps	Goals	Apps	Goals	Apps	Goals	Apps	Goals
Singapore			League		Singapore Cup		League Cup		Total	
2014	Albirex Niigata FC (S)	S.League	24	0	3	0	3	0	30	0
2015	Albirex Niigata FC (S)	S.League	27	1	6	0	4	0	37	1
2016	Albirex Niigata FC (S)	S.League	21	1	5	0	5	0	31	1
Total
Total	Singapore		72	2	14	0	12	0	98	2
Cambodia			League		Hun Sen Cup				Total	
2017	Nagaworld FC	Metfone C-League	21	1	0	0	0	0	21	1
2018	Soltilo Angkor FC	Metfone C-League	0	0	0	0	0	0	0	0
2019	Soltilo Angkor FC	Metfone C-League	17	1	0	0	0	0	17	1
2020	Soltilo Angkor FC	Metfone C-League	0	0	0	0	0	0	0	0
Total
Total	Cambodia		38	2	0	0	0	0	38	2
Career total			72	2	14	0	12	0	98	2
