= Prey Veng FC =

Association football club

- Full name: Prey Veng Football Club ក្លឹបបាល់ទាត់ខេត្តព្រៃវែង
- Nickname: Farmer Lady
- Founded: 2020; 6 years ago
- Dissolved: 2024
- Ground: Prey Veng Stadium
- Capacity: 1,200
- Coach: Long Rithea
- League: Cambodian Premier League
- 2023–24: 8th
Home colours	Away colours

Prey Veng Football Club (Khmer: ក្លឹបបាល់ទាត់ខេត្តព្រៃវែង) is a former football club based in Prey Veng Province. The club competes in the Hun Sen Cup. After an unbeaten run in the 2020 Cambodian Second League, the club made its debut in the 2021 Cambodian League.

== Current squad ==
As of Last appearance in Cambodian Premier League

Note: Flags indicate national team as defined under FIFA eligibility rules; some limited exceptions apply. Players may hold more than one non-FIFA nationality.

No.	Pos.	Nation	Player
1	GK	CAM	Kim Chanveasna
4	DF	CAM	Lo Rasi (on loan from Visakha Academy)
5	DF	JPN	Ryo Kato
7	FW	CAM	Ky Rina (on loan from Visakha)
8	MF	CAM	Kong Lyhour
9	FW	MYA	Thiha Zaw
10	MF	CAM	Phan Sophen
11	FW	JPN	Masatoshi Takeshita
12	DF	CAM	Ath Ontoch
13	DF	CAM	Pov Chanthet
16	FW	JPN	Naoya Tokai
18	MF	CAM	San Sovanth (Captain)
20	DF	CAM	Chan Sarapich (on loan from Visakha)

No.	Pos.	Nation	Player
21	GK	CAM	Seng Sovanara
22	MF	CAM	Sor Samuth
23	DF	CAM	Lin Daradevid
31	GK	CAM	Sang Hankhun (on loan from Visakha)
33	MF	CAM	Tha Kriya
56	GK	CAM	Soeun Rithvirakvathana
66	DF	CAM	Dy Pharunn
70	DF	CAM	Ly Daro (on loan from Visakha Academy)
73	FW	CAM	Voeun Va (on loan from Visakha)
77	DF	CIV	Anderson Zogbe
88	DF	CAM	Kong Rithy
96	FW	CAM	Phuong Dina

=== Coaching staff ===
Position	Name
Head Coach	(Cambodia) Long Rithea
Goalkeeper Coach	(Thailand) Arthit Thanusorn
Fitness Coach	(Thailand) Pongborworn Kinawong

== Honours ==
- Cambodian Second League
  - Champions (1): 2020
- Hun Sen Cup
  - Third place (1): 2020
