= Khek Khemrin =

Cambodian footballer

Khek Khemrin ខែក ខេមរិន្ទ
Personal information
- Date of birth: January 10, 1989 (age 37)
- Place of birth: Phnom Penh, Cambodia
- Height: 1.70 m (5 ft 7 in)
- Position: Defender

Senior career*
Years	Team	Apps	(Gls)
2007–2020	National Defense Ministry		

International career^{‡}
2013–2015	Cambodia U-23		
2010–2013	Cambodia	3	(0)

Managerial career
- 2020–: Tiffy Army Youth (head coach)
- 2024–: Cambodia U-19 (assistant)
- 2026–: Cambodia, Cambodia U-16 (assistant)
- * Club domestic league appearances and goals ‡ National team caps and goals as of March 20, 2016

Khek Khemrin (born 10 January 1989) is a former Cambodian footballer who last played for National Defense Ministry in the Cambodian League and the Cambodia national team.

== Honours ==
=== Club ===
National Defense Ministry

- Hun Sen Cup: 2010, 2016
