= Angkor City FC =

Cambodian professional association football club

Angkor City
- Full name: Angkor City Football Club
- Founded: 2013; 13 years ago as Next Step FC; 2023; 3 years ago as Angkor City
- Dissolved: 2024
- Ground: Hanuman Stadium; Siem Reap province, Cambodia
- Capacity: 5,000
- League: Cambodian League 2
Home colours	Away colours

Angkor City Football Club (formerly known as Next Step Football Club) is a Cambodian professional football club based in Siem Reap province. The club currently plays in the Cambodian League 2.

== History ==
=== Foundation ===
Next Step Football Club was founded in 2013 by Charlie Pomroy and Keo Sophal. With the help of goalkeeping coach Charles Dailey, the not-for-profit football academy, working to help underprivileged children in Cambodia, joined the Cambodian second tier to participate in its first professional season in 2022.

=== Debut professional season ===
Next Step Football Club registered as a professional club in July 2021, before making its professional football debut in 2022. The team finished 11th in the league, with Brazilian striker Bruno Krenkel ending the season as the club's top scorer, logging ten goals – one of those, a long-range wonder strike, which gained global acclaim.

In 2023, former Dorchester Town manager Callum Brooks joined the club as technical director. Brooks stated that he joined Next Step "to be another body behind a great vision". Richard Harcus, CEO of Harcus Consultancy Group, arrived at the club in November 2023 as a new director of football and general manager. He left to join Balestier Khalsa FC in early 2025.

=== Investment in the club ===
In 2023, Next Step teamed up with recruitment and relocation company Next Step International (NSI) “in a deal which will see the latter help hire, move and adapt the latest quality football talent from around the world” to Cambodia.

== 2024 squad ==
Note: Flags indicate national team as defined under FIFA eligibility rules; some limited exceptions apply. Players may hold more than one non-FIFA nationality.

No.	Pos.	Nation	Player
1	GK	CAM	Chhun Phally
2	DF	CAM	Rith Ra
3	DF	CAM	Boeun Ratha
4	DF	CAM	Khun Sokmeng
5	DF	USA	Federico Diaz
6	DF	CAM	Put Chomnan
8	MF	JPN	Takuya Yamase
9	FW	CAM	Chea Savey
12	DF	CAM	Mab Sinai
13	MF	CAM	Nhep Oeurn Sovanndet
16	MF	CAM	Ren Ro
18	MF	CAM	Thoeurn Soreach
19	MF	CAM	Kong Reatrey
21	FW	CAM	Heng Kimsong
22	GK	CAM	Tuy Terdararith

No.	Pos.	Nation	Player
23	DF	CAM	Yong Mengchhay (Captain)
28	DF	CAM	Khorn Sakada
29	FW	COD	Joslyn Ghifem Katuala
30	GK	CAM	Toch Samnang
32	DF	CAM	Lay Somrach
33	DF	CAM	Thai Pharothana
40	DF	CAM	Ta Mattamon
44	DF	CAM	Seat Ouji
47	FW	CAM	Mat Lyphaiyat
50	DF	JPN	Kento Fujihara
60	MF	CAM	Chhun Channy
66	DF	CAM	Keo Pich
68	MF	CAM	Phan Makara
90	FW	CAM	Vuth Lyminh
99	GK	CAM	Yeourn Rathana
