= Koji Gyotoku =

Japanese football player and manager

Koji Gyotoku 行徳 浩二
Personal information
- Full name: Koji Gyotoku
- Date of birth: January 28, 1965 (age 61)
- Place of birth: Shizuoka, Japan
- Height: 1.75 m (5 ft 9 in)
- Position: Defender

Team information
- Current team: Cambodia (head coach)

Youth career
- 1981–1983: Tokai University Daiichi High School

College career
Years	Team	Apps	(Gls)
1984–1987	Tokai University		

Senior career*
Years	Team	Apps	(Gls)
1988–1989	Werder Bremen II		
1989–1992	Toyota Motors	16	(0)

Managerial career
- 2003–2004: Shimizu S-Pulse
- 2004–2005: Shimizu S-Pulse (assistant)
- 2005–2008: Shimizu S-Pulse U18
- 2008–2010: Bhutan
- 2010–2011: Omiya Ardija (assistant)
- 2012–2013: FC Gifu
- 2014–2015: Angthong
- 2016–2018: Nepal
- 2016–2018: Nepal U23
- 2019–2024: Bati Academy
- 2019–2023: Cambodia U21
- 2023–: Cambodia U23
- 2024–2025: Cambodia U17
- 2024–2025: Cambodia U21
- 2024–: Cambodia
- 2025–: Cambodia Women
Medal record
Men's football
Representing Nepal (as manager)
AFC Solidarity Cup
Winner	2016 Malaysia
Representing Cambodia (as manager)
FIFA ASEAN Challenge Cup
Runner-up	2026 Hong Kong
- * Club domestic league appearances and goals

Koji Gyotoku (行徳 浩二, Gyōtoku Kōji; born January 28, 1965) is a Japanese coach and former footballer. He is the currently coaching Cambodia, Cambodia U23 and Cambodia Women.

== Playing career ==
Gyotoku was born January 28, 1965, in Shizuoka Prefecture, Japan. He went to school at Shizuoka Municipal Shimizu Daigo Junior High School and Tokai University Daiichi High School. After high school, he went to Tokai University. Gyotoku began his football career with Werder Bremen II, a team in West Germany. Later, he went on to play for Toyota Motors. He played in 13 games for the team, appearing in 12 in 1990-91 and once in 1991-92, but never scored a goal for the team. The team did not make the JSL Cup.

== Club statistics ==
Gyotoku played in for each of the schools he attended before he reached the professional level.

Season	Club	League	League		Cup		League Cup		Total	
Season	Club	League	Apps	Goals	Apps	Goals	Apps	Goals	Apps	Goals
1989-90	Toyota Motors	JSL Division 2	3	0	?	0	0	0	3	0
1990-91	Toyota Motors	JSL Division 1	12	0	?	0	0	0	12	0
1991-92	Toyota Motors	JSL Division 1	1	0	?	0	0	0	1	0
Career total			16	0	0	0	0	0	16	0

Other official game

- 1990
  - Konica Cup 1 appearance with no goal

== Managerial career ==
Gyotoku coached the Shimizu S-Pulse in 2003 after Takeshi Oki resigned from his position as team manager He led the team to the semi-finals of the J.League Cup and the Emperor's Cup, placing them 11th overall in the league. The team went on to make it to the AFC Champions League group stage.

Gyotoku became the coach of the Bhutan national team in 2008. He led the Bhutan team the semifinals of the 2008 South Asian Football Federation Cup tournament, where they lost to India (2 - 1) during stoppage time of extra time. It was the furthest the team had ever gone. In the 2008 and 2010 AFC Challenge Cup he would lead the team to third and fourth place respectively. However, the team did not attempt to qualify for the 2010 World Cup, being the only FIFA member in the 2010 qualifications to withdraw. The cited reason for this was a lack of preparation of the field before their game against Kuwait.

From December 2014 to July 2015, Gyotoku was head coach of Angthong of the Thai Division 1 League. In early 2016, Gyotoku was appointed as head coach of the Nepal national team arriving in the Himalayan country on March 4, 2016. Under Gyotoku's guidance, Nepal performed well and improved its form during the 2019 AFC Asian Cup qualification, with Nepal achieved two respectable draws against eventual debutants Philippines and Yemen at home. But with Gyotoku being found to have entered Nepal with a tourist visa and had no legal working papers permit, he was fired as coach of Nepal in 2018.

== Managerial statistics ==
As of match played 3 October 2026

Managerial record by team and tenure
Team	Nat.	From	To	Record					Ref.
Team	Nat.	From	To	G	W	D	L	Win %	Ref.
Shimizu S-Pulse	(Japan)	1 December 2003	31 January 2004	4	3	0	1	75.00	
Bhutan	(Bhutan)	1 July 2008	30 April 2010	14	1	2	11	7.14	
FC Gifu	(Japan)	1 January 2012	18 August 2013	72	13	20	39	18.06	
Nepal U23	(Nepal)	4 March 2016	22 August 2018	4	0	0	4	0.00	
Nepal	(Nepal)	4 March 2016	22 August 2018	13	4	5	4	30.77	
Bati	(Cambodia)	1 January 2019	9 March 2025	2	0	0	2	0.00	
Cambodia U20	(Cambodia)	1 January 2019	9 March 2025	12	3	2	7	25.00	
Cambodia U16	(Cambodia)	1 July 2023	9 March 2025	3	2	1	0	66.67	
Cambodia U23	(Cambodia)	1 July 2023	Present	8	2	4	2	25.00	
Cambodia	(Cambodia)	13 September 2024	Present	19	6	3	10	31.58	
Career Total				151	34	37	80	22.52	
