= Asia Euro United =

Cambodian football club

អាស៊ី អឺរ៉ុប យូណាយធីត - Asia-Euro United
- Full name: Asia Euro United
- Nickname: អាស៊ីអឺរ៉ុប - Asia Euro
- Founded: 2013; 13 years ago
- Ground: AEU Sport Park; Kandal, Cambodia
- Capacity: 1,500
- Chairman: Duong Leang
- Manager: Men Piseth
- Coach: Sok Veasna
- League: Cambodian League 2
- 2022: 6th
Home colours	Away colours

Asia Euro United (Khmer: អាស៊ី អឺរ៉ុប យូណាយធីត) is a football club in Kandal, Cambodia. It plays in the Cambodian League, the top division of Cambodian football and it represents Asia Euro University.

== Current squad ==
Note: Flags indicate national team as defined under FIFA eligibility rules; some limited exceptions apply. Players may hold more than one non-FIFA nationality.

No.	Pos.	Nation	Player
3	DF	CAM	Ke Lyheng
4	DF	GHA	Mintah Bernard Owusu
5	DF	CAM	Chhan Bunmy
6	DF	CAM	Tep Veasnakomapitou
8	MF	CAM	Sles Hasann
11	MF	CAM	Noun Sopheak
15	FW	CAM	Hav Soknet
19	DF	CAM	Khem Sorady
23	MF	CAM	Seang Nirathon
27	MF	CAM	Pok Roza

No.	Pos.	Nation	Player
31	GK	CAM	Kheng Lyheang
66	MF	CAM	Morn Kakada
68	MF	CAM	Chhay Tetmenea
77	DF	CAM	Lay Raksmey (Captain)
99	FW	NGR	Samuel Ajayi
—	MF	CAM	Mom Vai
—		CAM	Sim Pin

== Honours ==
- TV5 Pre-season Championship
  - Winners (1): 2020
