= Chea Samnang =

Cambodian footballer

Chea Samnang ជា សំណាង
Personal information
- Date of birth: May 15, 1994 (age 32)
- Place of birth: Cambodia
- Height: 1.68 m (5 ft 6 in)
- Position: Midfielder

Team information
- Current team: Preah Khan Reach Svay Rieng (assistant)

Youth career
- Preah Khan Reach Svay Rieng

Senior career*
Years	Team	Apps	(Gls)
2010–2024	Preah Khan Reach Svay Rieng		

International career
2011	Cambodia U-19	4	(0)
2015	Cambodia	1	(0)
- * Club domestic league appearances and goals

Chea Samnang (born 15 May 1994) is a former Cambodian professional footballer.
