= Football in Cambodia =

The sport of football in the country of Cambodia is run by the Football Federation of Cambodia. It was introduced into the country by French settlers. The association administers the Metfone C-League. Football is the most popular sport in the country.

== Football stadiums in Cambodia ==
#	Stadium	Capacity	Tenants	Image
1	Morodok Techo National Stadium	60,000	Cambodia national football team	
2	Phnom Penh National Olympic Stadium	30,000		

== Attendances ==
The average attendance per top-flight football league season and the club with the highest average attendance:

Season	League average	Best club	Best club average
2023-24	1,312	Svay Rieng	3,051

Source: League page on Wikipedia

== See also ==
- Lists of stadiums
