= Tboung Khmum FC =

Cambodian football club

Tboung Khmum
- Full name: Tboung Khmum Football Club
- Nickname: The Beehive
- Ground: Memot Stadium
- Capacity: 1,000
- Owner(s): Department of Education, Youth, and Sport of Tboung Khmum Province
- Coach: Phon Raksmeypich
- League: Cambodian League 2
- 2022: 10th
- Website: https://cncc-football.com/hun-sen-cup.html
Home colours	Away colours

Tboung Khmum Football Club (Khmer: ខេត្តត្បូងឃ្មុំ) is a football club based in Tboung Khmum Province, Cambodia. The club competes in Hun Sen Cup, the main competition of Cambodian football national cup and Cambodian League 2. The team represents the Province and competes annually in the Provincial Stage of the competition.

== Players ==
=== Current squad ===
Note: Flags indicate national team as defined under FIFA eligibility rules; some limited exceptions apply. Players may hold more than one non-FIFA nationality.

No.	Pos.	Nation	Player
1	GK	CAM	Samath Ravy
4	DF	CAM	Slayman Pu Sror
5	DF	CAM	Slehfa Yilin
6	DF	CAM	Sar Ary
7	FW	CAM	Yusof Fa
9	MF	CAM	Yusof Sma El
10	MF	CAM	Meut Setsen
11	FW	SLE	Santigie Koroma
12	GK	CAM	Man Sleh
13	FW	CAM	Hak Nory
14	MF	CAM	Ker Fin

No.	Pos.	Nation	Player
17	FW	CAM	Vahed Famfa
18	MF	CAM	Sleh Toroman
19	DF	CAM	Ly Romi
21	MF	CAM	Sleh Hasann
22	MF	CAM	Mat Tuorn
26	FW	CAM	Tith Rozak
28	MF	CAM	Kob Vanny
33	DF	CAM	Sek Vanty
97	DF	CAM	Sleh Saynal

== Honours ==
- Hun Sen Cup Provincial Stage
  - Champion (2): 2019, 2024–25
