= Koh Kong FC =

Cambodian football club

- Full name: Koh Kong Football Club
- Nickname(s): Dockers
- Founded: 2007
- Ground: Koh Kong High School
- Capacity: 1,000
- Chairman: Phann Kannarath
- Coach: Hok Sochivorn
- League: Cambodian League 2
- 2022: 4th
- Website: https://cncc-football.com/hun-sen-cup.html
Home colours	Away colours

Koh Kong Football Club (Khmer: ខេត្តកោះកុង), is a football club based in Koh Kong Province, Cambodia. The club competes in the Hun Sen Cup, the major national cup competition of Cambodian football. The team represents the Province and competes annually in the Provincial Stage of the competition.

== Current squad ==
Note: Flags indicate national team as defined under FIFA eligibility rules; some limited exceptions apply. Players may hold more than one non-FIFA nationality.

No.	Pos.	Nation	Player
1	GK	(Cambodia) CAM	Touch Samnang
3	DF	(Cambodia) CAM	Kim Chhaya
4	DF	(Cambodia) CAM	Titeng Morkot
6	DF	(Cambodia) CAM	Touch Pancharong (Captain)
7	MF	(Cambodia) CAM	Pov Phearith (Vice-captain)
8	FW	(Cambodia) CAM	Um David
9	FW	(Cambodia) CAM	San Bora
10	MF	(Cambodia) CAM	Sary Matnorotin
11	FW	(Cambodia) CAM	Mat Sakrovy
12	DF	(Cambodia) CAM	Men Sopheak Vannaknisai
13	MF	(Japan) JPN	Kanta Asami
15	MF	(Cambodia) CAM	Pur Mengchhay
16	MF	(Cambodia) CAM	En Vichay
18	MF	(Cambodia) CAM	Him Rossaly

No.	Pos.	Nation	Player
19	FW	(Nigeria) NGA	Samuel Ajayi
20	DF	(Cambodia) CAM	Tin Phalla
21	GK	(Cambodia) CAM	Khandeth Sothea Vathana
26	MF	(Cambodia) CAM	Chan Sanith
30	FW	(Cambodia) CAM	Meak Daveth
32	GK	(Cambodia) CAM	Som Pov
44	DF	(Cambodia) CAM	Suong Sokleng
66	MF	(Cambodia) CAM	Vann Vit
71	DF	(Cambodia) CAM	Vong Visal
77	MF	(Myanmar) MYA	Thiha Zaw
79	MF	(Cambodia) CAM	Pen Panhavath
95	FW	(Rwanda) RWA	Atuheire Kipson
99	FW	(Nigeria) NGA	Okereke Timothy

== Honours ==
- Hun Sen Cup
  - Provincial Stage Winner (1): 2021
