= Electricite du Cambodge FC =

Cambodian football club

Électricité du Cambodge FC ក្លឹបបាល់ទាត់អគ្គិសនីកម្ពុជា
- Full name: Électricité du Cambodge Football Club
- Founded: 2015; 11 years ago
- Dissolved: 2023
- Ground: EDC Stadium, Phnom Penh
- Capacity: 300
- Manager: Som Saran
- Coach: Tum Saray
- League: Cambodian League 2
- 2022: 1st (Champion)
Home colours	Away colours

Électricité du Cambodge Football Club (EDCFC; Khmer: ក្លឹបបាល់ទាត់អគ្គិសនីកម្ពុជា, Klœ̆b Băltoăt Âkkĭsâni Kâmpŭchéa; lit. 'Electricity of Cambodia Football Club') are a football club in Phnom Penh, Cambodia. They will play in the Cambodian Premier League, having won Cambodian League 2

== Kit design ==
In 2021, the team signed a new kit deal with a Phnom Penh-based sporting apparel company named Forward Sportswear. Their home kit features a signature sky blue colour, whilst their away kit is red.

== Season results ==
EDCFC have featured in the top flight of Cambodian football since 2018. Their positions in the Cambodian League have varied in recent years. In 2021 they finished 10th after a fairly uneventful season, interrupted by COVID-19 safety measures. In 2020 they finished 12th, in comparison to 11th place in 2019. Their most successful league campaign was in 2018 whereby the team finished 9th during their debut to the top flight of Cambodian football.

== Current squad ==
Note: Flags indicate national team as defined under FIFA eligibility rules; some limited exceptions apply. Players may hold more than one non-FIFA nationality.

No.	Pos.	Nation	Player
1	GK	CAM	Som Sokundara
2	DF	CAM	Oem Vinun
3	DF	CAM	Manh Puthipanha
5	DF	CAM	Chhoeung Visinu (Captain)
6	MF	CAM	Khun Sengthai
7	FW	CAM	Chantha Chanteaka
9	FW	CAM	Hav Soknet
10	FW	CAM	Chhout Senteang
11	MF	CAM	Sean Sopheaktra
12	DF	CAM	Heng Kimhong
13	MF	CAM	Le Songpov
14	MF	CAM	Son Sovanpanha
15	DF	CAM	Sron Visal

No.	Pos.	Nation	Player
16	DF	CAM	Sron Rithysak
18	GK	CAM	Tuoth Sarouth
19	MF	CAM	Chreng Chanvirak
21	FW	CAM	Try Bunseangdyalen
22	DF	CAM	Ouch Panhaseth
23	MF	CAM	Im Dara
25	GK	CAM	Eng Keodavid
26	DF	CAM	Pok Oudom
27	DF	CAM	Phhorn Oy
30	DF	CAM	Chan Meta
35	FW	CAM	Krai Kimsing
36	DF	CAM	Chin Vannak (Vice-captain)
