= Siem Reap FC =

Cambodian football club

Siem Reap
- Full name: Siem Reap Football Club
- Founded: 2007; 19 years ago
- Ground: Svay Thom Stadium
- Capacity: 5,000
- Chairman: Blaed Huntly
- Head coach: Oriol Mohedano
- League: Cambodian League 2
Home colours	Away colours

Siem Reap Football Club (Khmer: ខេត្តសៀមរាប), also known as Siem Reap United, is a professional football club based in Siem Reap Province, Cambodia. The club competes in the Cambodian League 2. Its women's section plays in the Cambodian Women's League.
