= Soltilo Angkor FC =

Cambodian football club

- Full name: Soltilo Angkor Football Club
- Founded: 2016
- Dissolved: 1 June 2023; 3 years ago
- Ground: Hanuman Stadium
- Capacity: 5,000
- Chairman: Keisuke Honda and Por Vannith
- 2022: Cambodian League 2, 7th of 12
- Website: https://soltilo-angkor-fc.net/
Home colours	Away colours

Soltilo Angkor Football Club (Khmer: ក្លឹបបាល់ទាត់សូលទីឡូអង្គរ) was a football club based in Siem Reap, Cambodia. It competed in the Cambodian League 2, the second division of Cambodian football. On 1 June 2023, the club announced its statement that the club is dissolved due to financial problem.

== Former managers ==
- (England) Darren "Charlie" Pomroy
