= Visakha FC =

Association football club

Visakha វិសាខា
- Full name: Visakha Football Club
- Nickname: Blue Horse
- Founded: 2016; 10 years ago
- Ground: Prince Stadium
- Capacity: 15,000
- Chairwoman: Ke Suonsophy
- Head coach: Warren Moon
- League: Cambodian Premier League
- 2025–26: Cambodian Premier League, 7th of 11
- Website: https://visakhafootballclub.com/
Home colours	Away colours	Third colours

Visakha Football Club (Khmer: ក្លឹបបាល់ទាត់វិសាខា, Klœ̆b Băltoăt Vĭsakha) is a Cambodian professional football club based in Phnom Penh. Founded in 2016, it competes in the Cambodian Premier League.

Visakha has won 3 consecutive Hun Sen Cups since 2020, and qualified for the play-off round of the 2021 and the 2022 AFC Cup.

== History ==
=== Establishment and promotion (2016–2018) ===
Visakha was founded in 2016 in Phnom Penh, Cambodia. The club began competing in the Cambodian Second League before winning the division in 2017 to secure promotion to the Cambodian League, the country's top division. In its first season in the top flight, Visakha finished third, establishing itself as a competitive club in Cambodian football. In the 2018 season, Visakha decided to signed five North Korean players to filled up their foreign import quota, the club signed Choe Myong-ho, Pak Song-chol, Jang Song-hyok, Kim Kyong-hun and Ri Hyok-chol for the season where Visakha finished in third place in the league. Choe Myong-ho then went on to win the league 'Player of the Season' award.

=== Three-peat cup champions (2020–2022) ===
Visakha finished as runners-up in the Cambodian League in 2019, marking its first major achievement in the top division. The club also reached the semi-finals of the Hun Sen Cup that year. In 2020, Visakha won its first Hun Sen Cup title, defeating Nagaworld 2–0 in the final. The victory secured the club's first major domestic trophy and qualification for the 2021 AFC Cup. However, the competition was cancelled because of the COVID-19 pandemic.

Visakha retained the Hun Sen Cup in 2021 before winning it for a third consecutive time in 2022. These victories established the club as one of Cambodia's leading teams in knockout competitions. In the 2022 Cambodian Premier League season, Visakha finished as runners-up behind Phnom Penh Crown.

The club also participated in the 2022 AFC Cup, competing in Group G against Philippines club Kaya–Iloilo, Indonesian club Bali United and Malaysian club Kedah Darul Aman. Visakha finished second in the group after recording a 5–2 victory over Bali United and a 2–1 win against Kaya–Iloilo, but lost 5–1 to Kedah Darul Aman. The results ended its continental campaign at the group stage.

=== Continued competition in the Cambodian Premier League (2023–present) ===
Visakha remained among the leading clubs in Cambodia, finishing third in the 2023–24 and 2024–25 Cambodian Premier League seasons. During the 2024–25 campaign, the club finished third in the regular season and advanced to the championship play-offs. Although it did not win the league title, Visakha continued to compete for domestic honours and developed its squad through a combination of Cambodian and foreign players.

Visakha competed in the 2025–26 Cambodian Premier League under head coach Scott Cooper. The club remained in contention among the leading teams and reached the 2026 Hun Sen Cup final against Preah Khan Reach Svay Rieng on 24 May 2026. Visakha led 3–1 during the match and later scored again in extra time, but Svay Rieng equalised in stoppage time and eventually won 5–3 in the penalty shoot-out after the match ended 4–4. Visakha finished the competition as runners-up.

== Players ==
=== Current squad ===
As of July 2026

Note: Flags indicate national team as defined under FIFA eligibility rules; some limited exceptions apply. Players may hold more than one non-FIFA nationality.

No.	Pos.	Nation	Player
1	GK	CAM	Keo Soksela (Vice-captain)
2	DF	LAT	Vitālijs Jagodinskis
4	DF	BRA	Lucas Ambiel
5	DF	CAM	Sor Rotana
7	FW	CMR	Donovan Ewolo
9	FW	NED	Sherwin Seedorf
11	MF	CAM	Sin Kakada (Captain)
12	MF	CAM	Ly Sok Kryya
13	GK	CAM	Vy Phanith
15	FW	GAM	Ousman Gai
17	FW	CAM	Lim Pisoth
19	DF	CAM	Cheng Meng
20	DF	CAM	Sin Sophanat
21	FW	BRA	Cristian Roque
23	MF	CAM	In Sodavid
25	DF	CAM	Ken Chansopheak

No.	Pos.	Nation	Player
26	DF	CAM	Chan Sarapich
27	DF	CAM	Ouk Sovann
28	FW	BOL	Jaume Cuéllar
29	DF	BRA	Eduardo Thuram
33	GK	CAM	Chhert Samdy
34	MF	CAM	Tha Kriya
37	MF	CAM	Siem Raksa
42	MF	CAM	Sorn Chanreaksmey
45	MF	FRA	Aly Ndom
56	GK	CAM	Soeun Rithvirakvathana
70	MF	CAM	Andrés Nieto
77	FW	CAM	Hav Soknet
82	MF	CAM	Koem Chhayheng
88	MF	CAM	Sin Sovannmakara
91	DF	CAM	Phan Vreak
99	DF	CAM	Leng Nora

=== Out on loan ===
Note: Flags indicate national team as defined under FIFA eligibility rules; some limited exceptions apply. Players may hold more than one non-FIFA nationality.

No.	Pos.	Nation	Player
—	MF	CAM	Alisher Mirzaev (to (Cambodia) MOI Kompong Dewa)
—	GK	CAM	Hul Kimhuy (to (Cambodia) ISI Dangkor Senchey)
—	MF	BRA	Breno Caetano (to (Cambodia) PKR Svay Rieng)
—	DF	CAM	Kan Mo (to (Cambodia) ISI Dangkor Senchey)

=== Players with multiple nationalities ===
- (Colombia) (Cambodia) Andrés Nieto
- (Ghana) (Cambodia) Leng Nora
- (Suriname) (Netherlands) Sherwin Seedorf
- (Spain) (Bolivia) Jaume Cuéllar
- (Senegal) (France) Aly Ndom

== Management and staff ==
As of July 2026

Position	Name
Chairwoman	(Cambodia) Ke Suonsophy
Managing director	(Cambodia) Ou Panhasoketya
Member of the supervisory board	(Cambodia) Khiev Pheavy
Member of the supervisory board	(Cambodia) Meak Lipheng
General secretary	(Cambodia) Hok Sochetra
Sporting director	(England) Scott Cooper
Technical director	(Cambodia) Meas Channa
Head coach	(England) Warren Moon
Assistant coaches	(Cambodia) Rithea Long
Assistant coaches	(Trinidad and Tobago) Seon Power
Goalkeeper coach	(Belarus) Evgeniy Taykevich
Goalkeeper coach	(Cambodia) Simai Hem
Fitness coach	(Italy) Biagio de Franco
Fitness coach	(Germany) Sandi Sahman
Match analyst	(Hungary) David Laszlo
Physiotherapist	(Cambodia) Hun Penglong
Physiotherapist	(Japan) Yoshiki Harabe
Translator	(Cambodia) Ban Panha
Kit manager	(Cambodia) Him Vanthea
Kit manager	(Cambodia) Sok Penhchenda
Marketing & communications	(Cambodia) Chou Sophanna
Marketing & communications	(Cambodia) Neang Sovankiry

== Honours ==
Type	Honours	Titles	Seasons
League	Cambodian League 2/Second division	1	2017
Cup	Hun Sen Cup	3	2020, 2021, 2022

Bold is for those competition that are currently active.

== Award winners ==
=== Domestic ===
- Player of the Season
  - (North Korea) Choe Myong-ho (2018)
- Top Scorer
  - (Brazil) Ramon Tanque (2024–25)
- Team of the Season
  - (Cambodia) Sin Kakada (2025–26)

== Notable players ==
=== International capped players ===
AFC/OFC.: (Afghanistan) Mustafa Zazai; (Philippines) Mike Ott; (North Korea) Choe Myong-ho; (North Korea) Pak Song-chol; (South Korea) Park Jung-bin; (Timor-Leste) Mouzinho	CAF.: (Kenya) Benson Omala; (Cameroon) Donovan Ewolo; (Morocco) Youssef Ezzejjari; (South Sudan) Kenny Athiu	UEFA.: (Croatia) Filip Mihaljević; (Latvia) Artūrs Karašausks; (Latvia) Vitālijs Jagodinskis; (Scotland) Scott Allardice	CONMEBOL/ CONCACAF.: (Bolivia) Jaume Cuéllar; (Canada) Marcus Haber; (Trinidad and Tobago) Seon Power

== Managerial history ==
Name	Seasons	Achievements
(Cambodia) Hok Sochivorn	1 July 2017–3 July 2019	2017 Cambodian Second League
(Nigeria) Tunji Ayoyinka Akeeb	3 July 2019–31 December 2019	
(Republic of Ireland) Colum Curtis	10 January 2020–26 September 2021	2020 Hun Sen Cup
(Northern Mariana Islands) Johann Noetzel (caretaker)	27 September 2021–7 December 2021	2021 Hun Sen Cup
(South Korea) Lee Tae-hoon	8 December 2021–12 May 2022	
(Cambodia) Meas Channa	1 July 2022–30 November 2022	2022 Hun Sen Cup
(Scotland) Simon McMenemy	31 December 2022–5 December 2023	
(Cambodia) Meas Channa (2)	6 December 2023–16 June 2024	
(Latvia) Jurģis Kalns	16 June 2024–31 January 2025	
(Nigeria) Akeeb Tunji Ayoyinka (interim) (2)	1 February 2025–27 May 2025	
(England) Gerard Jones	27 May 2025–10 October 2025	
(Trinidad and Tobago) Seon Power (caretaker)	11 October 2025–16 November 2025	
(England) Scott Cooper	17 November 2025–present	

== Continental record ==
Season	Tournament	Round	Club	Home	Away	Aggregate
2021	AFC Cup	Group I	(Singapore) Geylang International	Cancelled		
2021	AFC Cup	Group I	(Timor-Leste) Lalenok United	Cancelled		
2021	AFC Cup	Group I	(Malaysia) Terengganu	Cancelled		
2022	AFC Cup	Group G	(Philippines) Kaya–Iloilo	2–1		2nd
2022	AFC Cup	Group G	(Indonesia) Bali United	5–2		2nd
2022	AFC Cup	Group G	(Malaysia) Kedah Darul Aman	1–5		2nd
