= Bati Youth Football Academy =

Cambodian football club

Bati Academy សាលាបាល់ទាត់ជាតិបាទី
- Full name: Bati Youth Football Academy សាលាបាល់ទាត់ជាតិយុវជនបាទី
- Ground: Bati Academy Stadium
- Owner: Sao Sokha
- League: Cambodian League 2
- 2023–24: 7th
- Website: http://www.ffcambodia.com/
Home colours

Bati Youth Football Academy (Khmer: សាលាបាល់ទាត់ជាតិយុវជនបាទី), also known as the National Football Academy or Bati Academy, is an under-18 football team operated by the FFC (Football Federation of Cambodia). The team was invited to compete in the 2019 Cambodian League as a project to expose younger players to higher level of competitions in order to compete in various international competitions such as the SEA Games.
