= ISI Dangkor Senchey FC =

ISI Dangkor Senchey អាយ អេស អាយ ដង្កោសែនជ័យ
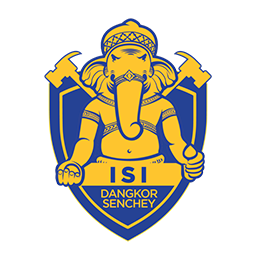
- Full name: ISI Dangkor Senchey Football Club ក្លឹបបាល់ទាត់ អាយអេសអាយ ដង្កោសែនជ័យ
- Nickname: The Elephants of Victory (ដំរីជ័យ)
- Short name: ISI DSC FC
- Founded: 2016; 10 years ago
- Ground: ISI Park
- Capacity: 3,000
- Owner: ISI GROUP
- President: Kang Sen
- Coach: Conor Nestor
- League: Cambodian Premier League
- 2025–26: Cambodian Premier League, 11th of 11
- Website: dangkorsenchey.com/en
Home colours	Away colours

ISI Dangkor Senchey Football Club (Khmer: ក្លឹបបាល់ទាត់អាយអេសអាយដង្កោសែនជ័យ) is a Cambodian professional football club based in the capital Phnom Penh. Founded in 2016, the club currently competes in the Cambodian Premier League, following promotion from the Cambodian League 2 in 2022 season. Formerly a semi-professional team, the club upgraded and took part in the Cambodian Second League.

== KMH Academy ==
The KMH Academy, a part of ISI GROUP's KMH Foundation, is a football academy that seeks to improve youth access to sports, together with helping players develop personally and academically. The KMH Foundation organizes Cambodia's largest semi-professional tournaments, including the KMH Champions League and the KMH U18 Cup.

== Players ==
As of 29 July 2026

Note: Flags indicate national team as defined under FIFA eligibility rules; some limited exceptions apply. Players may hold more than one non-FIFA nationality.

No.	Pos.	Nation	Player
1	GK	CAM	Hul Kimhuy (on loan from Visakha)
2	DF	CAM	Sek Chanpraseth
3	DF	BRA	Matheus Freitas
4	DF	CAM	Kan Mo (on loan from Visakha)
5	MF	JPN	Takahiro Tezuka
6	MF	CAM	Yudai Ogawa
7	FW	GUI	Lancine Diakite
8	MF	CAM	Un Sotherith
9	FW	CAM	Kang Sen
10	MF	CAM	Kouch Sokumpheak (on loan from Nagaworld)
11	MF	CAM	Long David
12	DF	CAM	Ry Leap Pheng
13	GK	CAM	John Euro
14	FW	CAM	Phan Sophen

No.	Pos.	Nation	Player
15	DF	CAM	Phork Seavleng
16	DF	CAM	Ya Math
17	DF	CAM	Sath Rosib
18	DF	CAM	Sam Ol Tina
20	FW	JPN	Daizo Horikoshi
21	FW	JPN	Shintaro Shimizu
22	GK	CAM	Kendeth Sotheavathana
23	DF	CAM	Ro Sithoun
24	MF	CAM	Noem Ovanda
25	MF	CAM	Oeun Sokpaga
26	GK	CAM	Eang Rosalim
27	MF	CAM	Rous Sereysophorn
37	FW	CMR	Privat Mbarga
93	DF	CAM	Thierry Bin (Captain)

=== Out on loan ===
Note: Flags indicate national team as defined under FIFA eligibility rules; some limited exceptions apply. Players may hold more than one non-FIFA nationality.

No.	Pos.	Nation	Player
19	FW	CAM	Morn Bunthab (to (Cambodia) Phnom Penh City)

== Coaching staff ==
Position	Name
Head coach	(Republic of Ireland) Conor Nestor
Assistant coach	(Poland) Kowalski Lukasz
Goalkeeper coach	(England) Rory Grand
Fitness coach	(Cambodia)
Match analysis	(Cambodia)
Doctor	(Cambodia)
Physiotherapist	(Cambodia) Keth Mealea
Kitman	(Cambodia)
Media manager	(Cambodia)

== Records ==
=== Domestic ===
- 2020 Cambodian Second League: 4th
- 2021 Cambodian Second League: Runners-up
- 2022 Cambodian League 2: Runners-up
