= Cambodian League 2 =

- Organising body: Cambodian Football League Company (CFLC)
- Founded: 2016; 10 years ago
- Country: Cambodia
- Confederation: AFC
- Number of clubs: 7
- Level on pyramid: 2
- Promotion to: Cambodian Premier League
- Relegation to: Regional leagues
- Domestic cup: Hun Sen Cup
- League cup: Cambodian League Cup
- Current champions: Life FC (1st title) (2023–24)
- Most championships: Electricite du Cambodge; Kirivong Sok Sen Chey; Visakha; Prey Veng; Bati Academy; Life FC; (1 title each)
- Website: Official website
- Current: 2026–27 Cambodian League 2

The Cambodian League 2 (Khmer: កម្ពុជាលីគ២, Kampuchea Lik 2 [kampuciə lik piː]), formerly the Cambodian Second League, is the second tier professional football league in Cambodia, managed by the Cambodian Football League Company (CFLC). It was first started in 2016 by the Football Federation of Cambodia. The winners from each of the 6 regions of the third level, the Regional League (North, South, East, West, Middle, and Phnom Penh), and from the Hun Sen Cup are qualified to play in the Cambodian League 2. The winner of the League 2 gets promoted to the top division Cambodian Premier League the following season.

== Championship history ==
Season	Champions	Runners-up	Third place
2016	**Kirivong Sok Sen Chey**	**Electricite du Cambodge**	Bati Academy
2017	**Visakha**	Bati Academy	Ministry of National Defense Academy; **Soltilo Angkor** (Note: Since both Bati Academy and Ministry of National Defense Academy are reserve teams, they're ineligible for promotion. That leaves 4th place Soltilo Angkor to be promoted to the first division for the 2018 season.)
2018	Not held		
2019	Not held		
2020	**Prey Veng**	Tiffy Army U21	Phnom Penh Crown U21
2021	Bati Academy	ISI Dangkor Senchey	Tbong Khmum

=== 2022–present Cambodian League 2 ===
Season	Champions	Runners-up	3rd to 5th Place
2022	Electricite du Cambodge	**ISI Dangkor Senchey**	National Police; Koh Kong; **Prey Veng** (Note: Since Electricite du Cambodge, National Police and Koh Kong fail to meet the requirement of national club licensing criteria, they're ineligible for promotion. That leaves runners up ISI Dangkor Senchey and 5th place Prey Veng to be promoted to the first division for the 2023-24 season.)
2023–24	**Life FC**	**Ministry of Interior FA**	Tiffy Army B Visakha B ISI Dangkor Senchey B
2024–25	Not held		
2025–26	Not held		

- **Bold** denotes team earned promotion.

=== Championships by club ===
Club	Championship	Championship seasons
Bati Academy	1	2021
Electricite du Cambodge	1	2022
Kirivong Sok Sen Chey	1	2016
Prey Veng	1	2020
Visakha	1	2017
Life	1	2023–24

== See also ==
- Football in Cambodia
