= Football Federation of Cambodia =

Governing body of association football in Cambodia

AFC
- Founded: 1933; 93 years ago
- Headquarters: Phnom Penh, Cambodia
- FIFA affiliation: 1954
- AFC affiliation: 1954
- AFF affiliation: 1998
- President: Khiev Sameth (interim)
- Vice-President: Khek Ravy
- Website: the-ffc.org

The Football Federation of Cambodia (FFC; Khmer: សហព័ន្ធកីឡាបាល់ទាត់កម្ពុជា, Sahapoan Keila Baltoat Kampuchea) is a governing body that administers some association football and futsal activities in Cambodia.

== Names ==
- Fédération Khmère de Football Association (FKFA; 1933–1998)
- Cambodian Football Federation (CFF; 1998–2006)
- Football Federation of Cambodia (FFC; 2006–present)

== Staff ==
Staff
Name	Position
(Cambodia) Sao Sokha	President
(Cambodia) Khiev Sameth	Vice President
(Cambodia) Keo Sareth	General Secretary
(Cambodia) Vichea Dy	Treasurer
(Japan) Kazunori Ohara	Technical Director
(Japan) Koji Gyotoku	Team Coach (Men's)
(China) Gao Fulin	Team Coach (Women's)
(Cambodia) Bun Hoeurn Tuy	Futsal Coordinator
(Cambodia) Yean Kywadhana	Referee Coordinator

== Tournaments ==
=== Leagues ===
- Cambodian Premier League
- Cambodian League 2
- Cambodian Women's League

=== Cups ===
- Hun Sen Cup
- Cambodian League Cup
- Cambodian Super Cup

== National teams ==
- Cambodia national football team
- Cambodia national futsal team
- Cambodia national under-17 football team
- Cambodia national under-21 football team
- Cambodia national under-23 football team
- Cambodia women's national football team
- Cambodia women's national under-16 football team
- Cambodia women's national under-19 football team
- Cambodia national under-16 football team
- Cambodia national under-19 football team
