= 2023–24 Cambodian Premier League =

Cambodian Premier League
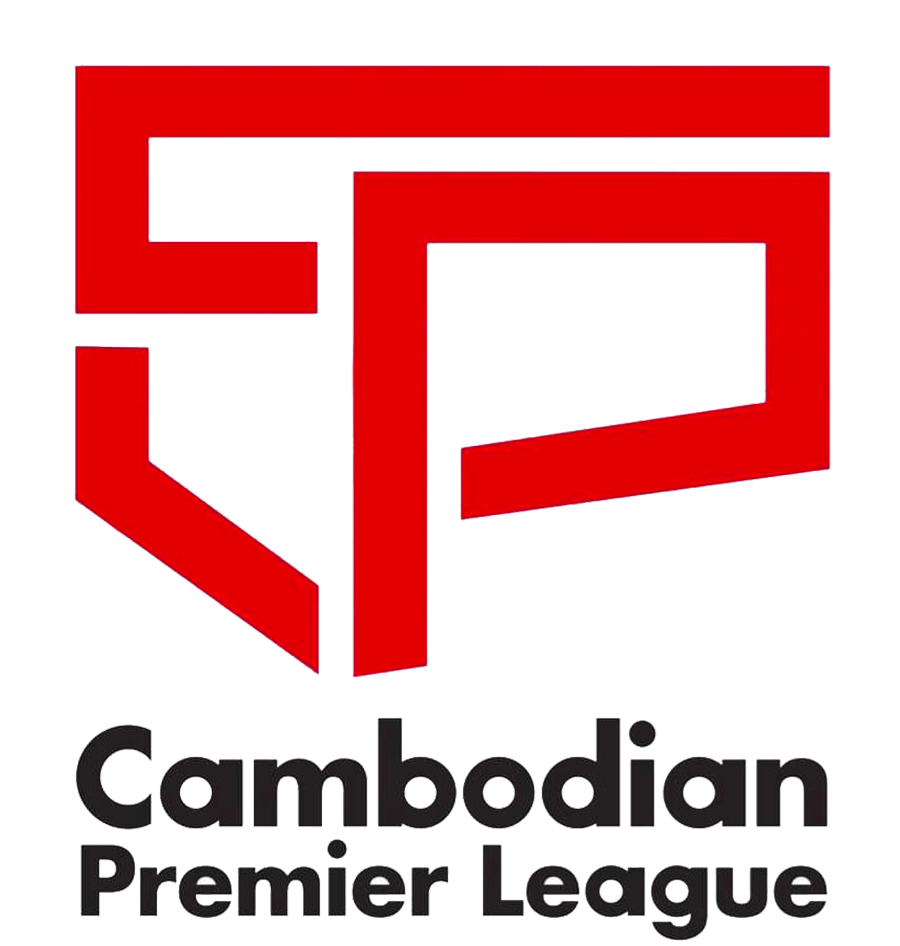
- Season: 2023–24
- Dates: 5 August 2023 – 12 May 2024
- Champions: Preah Khan Reach Svay Rieng (3rd title)
- AFC Challenge League: Preah Khan Reach Svay Rieng FC
- Matches: 135
- Goals: 490 (3.63 per match)
- Top goalscorer: (Canada) Marcus Haber (31 goals)
- Biggest home win: ISI Dangkor Senchey 7–1 Angkor Tiger (28 January 2024)
- Biggest away win: Angkor Tiger 1–7 Preah Khan Reach Svay Rieng (16 December 2023)
- Highest scoring: Boeung Ket FC 5–5 Phnom Penh Crown (4 November 2023)
- Longest winning run: 11 matches Preah Khan Reach Svay Rieng
- Longest unbeaten run: 12 matches Preah Khan Reach Svay Rieng
- Longest winless run: 10 matches Kirivong Sok Sen Chey
- Longest losing run: 5 matches Angkor Tiger
- Highest attendance: 5,078; Phnom Penh Crown 2–1 Boeung Ket (6 August 2023)
- Lowest attendance: 624; Kiriong Sok Sen Chey 1–1 Prey Veng (27 August 2023)
- Total attendance: 106,456
- Average attendance: 2,139
- All statistics correct as of 23 October 2023.

The 2023–24 Cambodian Premier League was the 39th season of the Cambodian Premier League, the top Cambodian professional league for association football clubs, since its establishment in 1982. It began on 5 August 2023 and concluded on 12 May 2024, the first season to play in an inter-year span.

There were ten teams competed in a triple round-robin match. ISI Dangkor Senchey and Prey Veng were promoted from the 2022 Cambodian League 2.

Phnom Penh Crown were the defending champions, having won their 8th recorded league title in 2022 season. On 4 May 2024, Preah Khan Reach Svay Rieng were crowned champion for the third time in league history.

== Teams ==
Locations of the 2023–24 Cambodian Premier League teams

A total of 10 teams participated in the 2023–24 edition of the Cambodian Premier League.

=== Team changes ===
Promoted from 2022 Cambodian League 2	Relegated from 2022 Cambodian Premier League
ISI Dangkor Senchey; Prey Veng	None

=== Stadiums and locations ===
Team	Location	Stadium	Capacity	Previous season
Angkor Tiger	Siem Reap Province	Hanuman Stadium	5,030	Cambodian Premier League (7th)
Boeung Ket	Phnom Penh	Olympic Stadium (Interim)	35,000	Cambodian Premier League (4th)
ISI Dangkor Senchey	Phnom Penh	AIA Stadium KMH PARK	3,000	Cambodian League 2 (2nd)
Kirivong Sok Sen Chey	Takéo Province	Kirivong Sok Sen Chey Stadium	1,000	Cambodian Premier League (8th)
Nagaworld	Kampong Speu Province	Kampong Speu Stadium	3,000	Cambodian Premier League (5th)
Phnom Penh Crown	Phnom Penh	Smart RSN Stadium	5,010	Cambodian Premier League (1st)
Preah Khan Reach Svay Rieng	Svay Rieng Province	Svay Rieng Stadium	4,000	Cambodian Premier League (3rd)
Prey Veng	Prey Veng Province	Prey Veng Stadium	1,200	Cambodian League 2(5th)
Tiffy Army	Phnom Penh	RCAF Old Stadium	15,000	Cambodian Premier League (6th)
Visakha	Phnom Penh	Prince Stadium	10,000	Cambodian Premier League (2nd)

=== Personnel and kits ===
Team	Manager	Captain	Kit manufacturer	Shirt sponsor
Angkor Tiger	(Cambodia) Ny Yuth (caretaker)	(Cambodia) Sophal Dimong	(Cambodia) NT Sport	
Boeung Ket	(Cambodia) Hong Pheng (interim)	(Cambodia) Chan Vathanaka	(Thailand) EGO Sport	Cambodia Airways
ISI Dangkor Senchey	(Ghana) John Botioba	(Ivory Coast) Abdel Kader Coulibaly	(Cambodia) NT Sport	ISI Palm
Kirivong Sok Sen Chey	(Cambodia) Sabone Venta	(Cambodia) Chhing Sokphanny	(Cambodia) NT Sport	Krud Beer
Nagaworld	(Cambodia) Khim Borey	(Cambodia) Kouch Sokumpheak	(Thailand) FBT	NagaWorld
Phnom Penh Crown	(Ukraine) Oleg Starynskyi	(Cambodia) Orn Chanpolin	(Thailand) Warrix	Smart Axiata, Pi Pay
Preah Khan Reach Svay Rieng	(Spain) Pep Muñoz	(Cambodia) Soeuy Visal	(Thailand) FBT	Orkide Villa
Prey Veng	(Cambodia) Long Rithea	(Cambodia) San Sovath	(Cambodia) Forward Sportswear	V-ACTIVE
Tiffy Army	(Cambodia) Phea Sopheaktra	(Cambodia) Thourng Da	(Cambodia) NT Sport	TIFFY
Visakha	(Cambodia) Meas Channa	(South Africa) Mohammed Khan	(Cambodia) Forward Sportswear	Prince Bank

=== Managerial changes ===
Team	Outgoing	Manner	Exit date		Position in table	Incoming	Incoming date		Ref.
Team	Outgoing	Manner	Announced on	Departed on	Position in table	Incoming	Announced on	Arrived on	Ref.
Visakha	(Cambodia) Meas Channa	Mutual consent	30 November 2022		Pre-season	(Scotland) Simon McMenemy	31 December 2022		
Kirivong Sok Sen Chey	(Spain) Manuel Retamero	Mutual consent	22 December 2022		Pre-season	(Cambodia) Sabone Venta	21 January 2023		
Boeung Ket	(Cambodia) Hao Socheat (interim)	End of caretaker spell	January 2023		Pre-season	(Singapore) Clement Teo	27 January 2023		
PKR Svay Rieng	(Republic of Ireland) Conor Nestor	Mutual consent	3 May 2023		Pre-season	(Spain) Pep Muñoz	6 May 2023		
Tiffy Army	(Cambodia) Hor Sokheng	Mutual consent	18 July 2023		Pre-season	(Cambodia) Phea Sopheaktra	18 July 2023		
Angkor Tiger	(England) Alistair Heath	Mutual consent	1 September 2023		8th	(Cambodia) Ny Yuth (caretaker)	5 September 2023		
Visakha	(Scotland) Simon McMenemy	Mutual consent	5 December 2023		3rd	(Cambodia) Meas Channa	6 December 2023		
Boeung Ket	(Singapore) Clement Teo	Appointed as technical director	15 December 2023		5th	(Cambodia) Hong Pheng (interim)	15 December 2023		

== Foreign players ==
The number of foreign players is restricted to 6 per team. A team can use 5 foreign players on the field in each game, including at least 2 players from the AFC and the AFF region.

Players name in bold indicates the player is registered during the mid-season transfer window.

Club	Player 1	Player 2	Player 3	Player 4	AFC Player	ASEAN Player	Former Players
Angkor Tiger	(Canada) Alessandro Riggi	(England) Ben Nugent	(Singapore) Delwinder Singh		(Japan) Shodai Nishikawa	(Philippines) Pocholo Bugas	(Spain) Víctor Blasco (Afghanistan) **Moshtaq Ahmadi**
Boeung Ket	(Serbia) Stefan Golubović	(Japan) Mahiro Takahashi	(Japan) **Yusuke Muta**	(France) **Antoine Lemarié**	(Japan) Ryohei Yoshihama		(Ivory Coast) Anderson Zogbe (England) Luke Stokoe
ISI Dangkor Senchey	(Sierra Leone) Umaru Samura	(Ivory Coast) Abdel Kader Coulibaly	(Cameroon) Louis Willy Ndongo	(South Korea) Cheon Jin-ryeong	(Japan) Kazu Yanagidate	(Timor-Leste) Jhon Frith	
Kirivong Sok Sen Chey	(Egypt) Mahmoud El Sayed	(Japan) **Hikaru Mizuno**	(Japan) **Anto Okamura**	(Cameroon) **Neville Tengeg**	(Japan) Dylan Nobiraki	(Timor-Leste) Zenivio	(Japan) Daiki Jahana (Cameroon) Yannick Francois (Brazil) Romário Alves
Nagaworld	(Brazil) Cristian Roque	(Kyrgyzstan) Bektur Amangeldiev	(Japan) **Hugo Kametani**	(Japan) **Yuta Naruse**	(Japan) Yuta Kikuchi		(Brazil) Marques Marcio (Brazil) Alexandre Cardoso (Indonesia) Rafli Mursalim
Phnom Penh Crown	(Brazil) Denilson	(Cambodia) Andres Nieto	(Japan) Shintaro Shimizu	(Netherlands) **Jelle Goselink**	(Cambodia) Takaki Ose	(Myanmar) Soe Moe Kyaw	
Preah Khan Reach Svay Rieng	(Brazil) Gabriel Silva	(Brazil) Iago Fernandes	(Canada) Marcus Haber	(Japan) Ryo Fujii	(Japan) Takashi Odawara	(Laos) Bounphachan Bounkong	
Prey Veng	(Japan) Masatoshi Takeshita	(Japan) **Tokai Naoya**	(Ivory Coast) **Anderson Zogbe**		(Japan) Ryo Kato	(Myanmar) Thiha Zaw	(The Gambia) Ahmad Saidy (Japan) So Omae
Tiffy Army	(Brazil) Caio dos Santos	(Japan) Tetsuaki Misawa	(Japan) **Reiya Kinoshita**	(Portugal) **Josemar Agostinho**	(Japan) Shori Murata	(Thailand) Sarayut Sompim	(Brazil) Lucas Massaro (Japan) Toshiya Takagi
Visakha	(Brazil) Jonata	(South Africa) Mohammed Khan	(Spain) **Víctor Blasco**	(Spain) **Youssef Ezzejjari**	(Uzbekistan) Alisher Mirzaev	(Timor-Leste) Mouzinho	(Brazil) Jorge Eduardo (Japan) Takumu Nishihara

=== Players holding Cambodian dual citizenship ===
Cambodian dual nationals do not take up foreign players quota.

Club	Player 1	Player 2	Player 3	Player 4
Angkor Tiger				
Boeung Ket				
ISI Dangkor Senchey				
Kirivong Sok Sen Chey				
Nagaworld	(France) (Thailand) Seng Saravuthy			
Phnom Penh Crown	(Japan) Yudai Ogawa			
Preah Khan Reach Svay Rieng	(France) Dani Kouch	(France) Thierry Chantha Bin	(United States) Nick Taylor	
Prey Veng				
Tiffy Army	(New Zealand) Lim Aarun Raymond			
Visakha	(Ghana) Leng Nora	(Sweden) (Burundi) Mohammath Hamisi		

== League table ==
=== Regular season ===
Pos	Team	Pld	W	D	L	GF	GA	GD	Pts	Qualification or relegation
1	Preah Khan Reach Svay Rieng (Q)	27	22	3	2	73	30	+43	69	Qualified to Championship round
2	Phnom Penh Crown (Q)	27	20	4	3	63	30	+33	64	Qualified to Championship round
3	Visakha (Q)	27	14	2	11	53	40	+13	44	Qualified to Championship round
4	Boeung Ket (Q)	27	11	8	8	62	48	+14	41	Qualified to Championship round
5	Tiffy Army	27	12	3	12	46	39	+7	39	
6	ISI Dangkor Senchey	27	10	4	13	43	55	−12	34	
7	Nagaworld	27	7	9	11	36	49	−13	30	
8	Prey Veng	27	6	5	16	45	62	−17	23	Dissolved before the next season started
9	Kirivong Sok Sen Chey	27	5	5	17	34	62	−28	20	
10	Angkor Tiger	27	5	3	19	35	75	−40	18	

Updated to match(es) played on 22 April 2024. Source: Soccerway
Rules for classification: 1) Points; 2) Head to Head; 3) Goal difference; 4) Goals scored; 5) Disciplinary points
(Q) Qualified for the phase indicated

== Results ==
Home \ Away	ANG	BOE	ISI	KSS	NAG	PPC	SVA	PRE	TIF	VIS	ANG	BOE	ISI	KSS	NAG	PPC	SVA	PRE	TIF	VIS
Angkor Tiger		3–3	2–1	2–0	0–0	0–3	1–7	1–2	0–3	3–4				2–2	0–1	0–2		2–5	2–1	
Boeung Ket	4–1		4–1	2–0	3–1	5–5	1–3	2–2	3–4	4–2	5–2			2–1	1–0		3–3			1–2
ISI Dangkor Senchey	1–0	2–1		1–1	1–1	0–2	1–2	0–5	2–1	1–1	7–1	2–3			2–0		2–4	1–1		
Kirivong Sok Sen Chey	1–3	0–6	0–1		6–1	1–0	0–4	1–2	1–1	0–2			4–2			1–4		3–0	2–0	
Nagaworld	4–1	0–0	2–3	1–1		2–3	1–0	0–4	2–1	1–4				2–1		1–1			0–2	3–1
Phnom Penh Crown	3–2	2–1	4–2	4–1	1–1		0–0	3–1	1–0	3–1		1–0	3–2					3–2	2–1	
Preah Khan Reach Svay Rieng	5–2	3–3	1–2	2–1	1–0	2–1		2–0	1–0	4–3	3–0			4–1	4–3	3–2				
Prey Veng	2–3	1–1	0–1	2–2	4–5	0–3	3–5		0–3	0–2		0–2			2–2		0–3		1–3	1–4
Tiffy Army	3–1	0–0	4–0	4–2	1–1	0–3	0–2	2–4		2–1		5–2	3–2				0–1			2–1
Visakha	2–1	2–0	4–0	2–0	1–1	0–1	0–1	3–1	2–0		1–0		1–3	6–1		1–3	0–3			

Updated to match(es) played on 21 April 2024. Source: Soccerway
Legend: Blue = home team win; Yellow = draw; Red = away team win.

== Championship round ==
=== League table ===
Pos	Team	Pld	W	D	L	GF	GA	GD	Pts	Qualification or relegation
1	Preah Khan Reach Svay Rieng (C)	30	24	4	2	83	33	+50	76	Qualification for the AFC Challenge League group stage and the AFF Shopee Cup Play-off round
2	Phnom Penh Crown	30	21	5	4	69	33	+36	68	
3	Visakha	30	15	3	12	57	46	+11	48	
4	Boeung Ket	30	11	9	10	64	58	+6	42	

Updated to match(es) played on 13 May 2024. Source: Soccerway
Rules for classification: 1) Points; 2) Head to Head; 3) Goal difference; 4) Goals scored
(C) Champions

=== Results ===
Home \ Away	BOE	PPC	SVA	VIS
Boeung Ket	—	0–5	—	—
Phnom Penh Crown	—	—	1–1	0–2
Preah Khan Reach Svay Rieng	4–1	—	—	5–1
Visakha	1–1	—	—	—

Updated to match(es) played on 13 May 2024. Source: Soccerway
Legend: Blue = home team win; Yellow = draw; Red = away team win.

== Season statistics ==
=== Top scorers ===
As of 13 May 2024.

Rank	Player	Club	Goals
1	(Canada) Marcus Haber	Svay Rieng	31
2	(Japan) Shintaro Shimizu	Phnom Penh Crown	21
3	(Cambodia) Nhean Sosidan	Tiffy Army	13
3	(Japan) Ryohei Yoshihama	Boeung Ket	13
3	(Cambodia) Lim Pisoth	Phnom Penh Crown	13
6	(Cameroon) Louis Willy Ndongo	ISI Dangkor Senchey	12
6	(Serbia) Stefan Golubović	Boeung Ket	12
6	(Colombia) Andrés Nieto	Phnom Penh Crown	12
6	(Laos) Bounphachan Bounkong	Svay Rieng	12
9	(Cambodia) Phan Sophen	Prey Veng	11
9	(Cameroon) Tengeg Neville	Kirivong Sok Sen Chey	11
9	(Cambodia) Mat Noron	Boeung Ket	11
9	(Spain) Victor Blasco	Angkor Tiger (4) / Visakha (7)	11
14	(Brazil) Jonata	Visakha	10
14	(Spain) Youssef Ezzejjari	Visakha	10
14	(Japan) Tetsuaki Misawa	Tiffy Army	10
17	(Myanmar) Thiha Zaw	Prey Veng	9
17	(Japan) Masatoshi Takeshita	Prey Veng	9
17	(Ivory Coast) Abdel Kader Coulibaly	ISI Dangkor Senchey	9
20	(Cambodia) Chan Vathanaka	Boeung Ket	8
21	(Timor-Leste) Jhon Frith	ISI Dangkor Senchey	7
21	(Japan) Hugo Kametani	Nagaword	7
21	(Japan) Reiya Kinoshita	Tiffy Army	7
24	(Cambodia) Sin Kakada	Visakha	6
24	(Brazil) Gabriel Silva	Preah Khan Reach Svay Rieng	6
24	(Cambodia) Sareth Krya	Preah Khan Reach Svay Rieng	6
24	(Cambodia) Brak Thiva	Phnom Penh Crown	6
28	(Cambodia) Sor Rotana	Visakha	5
28	(Cambodia) Sovan Dauna	Angkor Tiger	5
28	(Philippines) Pocholo Bugas	Angkor Tiger	5
28	(Canada) Alessandro Riggi	Angkor Tiger	5
28	(Brazil) Cristian Roque	Nagaworld	5
28	(Portugal) Josemar Agostinho	Tiffy Army	5
28	(Cambodia) Nick Taylor	Preah Khan Reach Svay Rieng	5
35	(Japan) So Omae	Prey Veng	4
35	(Brazil) Marques Marcio	Nagaword	4
35	(Cambodia) Sos Suhana	Nagaword	4
35	(Japan) Yuta Naruse	Nagaword	4
35	(Cambodia) Chin Nareak	Angkor Tiger	4
35	(Brazil) Denilson	Phnom Penh Crown	4
35	(Myanmar) Soe Moe Kyaw	Phnom Penh Crown	4
35	(Cambodia) Min Ratanak	Preah Khan Reach Svay Rieng	4
35	(Cambodia) Khoan Soben	Kirivong Sok Sen Chey	4
35	(Cambodia) Vann Tailamey	Boeung Ket	4
35	(Cambodia) Chantha Chanteaka	Boeung Ket	4
35	(Cambodia) Voeun Va	Prey Veng	4
47	(Cambodia) Sin Sophanat	Visakha	3
47	(Japan) Takumu Nishihara	Visakha	3
47	(Brazil) Romário Alves	Kirivong Sok Sen Chey	3
47	(Japan) Dylan Nobiraki	Kirivong Sok Sen Chey	3
47	(Timor-Leste) Zenivio	Kirivong Sok Sen Chey	3
47	(Brazil) Iago Fernandes	Preah Khan Reach Svay Rieng	3
47	(Japan) Ryo Fujii	Preah Khan Reach Svay Rieng	3
47	(Japan) Takashi Odawara	Preah Khan Reach Svay Rieng	3
47	(Japan) Shodai Nishikawa	Angkor Tiger	3
47	(England) Ben Nugent	Angkor Tiger	3
47	(Cambodia) Nop David	Boeung Ket	3
47	(Japan) Yusuke Muta	Boeung Ket	3
47	(Cambodia) Yudai Ogawa	Phnom Penh Crown	3
47	(Cambodia) Sam Ol Tina	ISI Dangkor Senchey	3
63	(Cambodia) Tha Kriya	Prey Veng	2
63	(Brazil) Lucas Massaro	Tiffy Army	2
63	(Japan) Toshiya Takagi	Tiffy Army	2
63	(Cambodia) Dav Nim	Nagaworld	2
63	(Kyrgyzstan) Bektur Amangeldiev	Nagaworld	2
63	(Japan) Yuta Kikuchi	Nagaworld	2
63	(Cambodia) In Sodavid	Visakha	2
63	(Timor-Leste) Mouzinho	Visakha	2
63	(South Africa) Mohammed Khan	Visakha	2
63	(Cambodia) Sa Ty	Visakha	2
63	(Cambodia) Som Sann	Kirivong Sok Sen Chey	2
63	(Cambodia) Ean Pisey	Kirivong Sok Sen Chey	2
63	(Cambodia) Kim Sokyuth	Preah Khan Reach Svay Rieng	2
63	(Cambodia) Prak Mony Udom	Preah Khan Reach Svay Rieng	2
63	(South Korea) Cheon Jin-ryeong	ISI Dangkor Senchey|-	2
63	(Cambodia) Chhom Sokhay	ISI Dangkor Senchey|-	2
63	(Ivory Coast) Anderson Zogbe	Boeung Ket (1) / Prey Veng (1)	2
63	(Cambodia) Long Phearath	Phnom Penh Crown	2
77	(Indonesia) Rafli Mursalim	Nagaworld	1
77	(Cambodia) Leng Makara	Nagaworld	1
77	(Cambodia) Chea Chandara	Nagaworld	1
77	(Cambodia) Kouch Sokumpheak	Nagaworld	1
77	(Cambodia) Dy Phanrann	Prey Veng	1
77	(Cambodia) Kong Rithy	Prey Veng	1
77	(Cambodia) San Sovathe	Prey Veng	1
77	(Japan) Tokai Naoya	Prey Veng	1
77	(Cambodia) Duch Sophea	ISI Dangkor Senchey	1
77	(Cambodia) Hav Soknet	ISI Dangkor Senchey	1
77	(Cambodia) Tray Vichet	ISI Dangkor Senchey	1
77	(Cambodia) Um Sotherith	ISI Dangkor Senchey	1
77	(Sierra Leone) Umaru Samura	ISI Dangkor Senchey	1
77	(Cambodia) Ly Mizan	ISI Dangkor Senchey	1
77	(Cambodia) Eam Ratana	ISI Dangkor Senchey	1
77	(Cambodia) Chea Vesly	Boeung Ket	1
77	(Japan) Mahiro Takahashi	Boeung Ket	1
77	(Cambodia) Taing Bunchhai	Boeung Ket	1
77	(Cambodia) Our Phearon	Boeung Ket	1
77	(Cambodia) Sleh Sen	Boeung Ket	1
77	(Cambodia) Phach Socheavila	Phnom Penh Crown	1
77	(Cambodia) Orn Chanpolin	Phnom Penh Crown	1
77	(Cambodia) Yeu Muslim	Phnom Penh Crown	1
77	(Cambodia) Pov Ponvuthy	Phnom Penh Crown	1
77	(Brazil) Jorge Eduardo	Visakha	1
77	(Cambodia) Ouk Sovann	Visakha	1
77	(Uzbekistan) Alisher Mirzaev	Visakha	1
77	(Cambodia) Reung Bunheing	Visakha	1
77	(Cambodia) Rong Pisey	Angkor Tiger	1
77	(Cambodia) Norng Vylik	Angkor Tiger	1
77	(Cambodia) Sary Matnorotin	Angkor Tiger	1
77	(Cambodia) Sokry Sofan	Angkor Tiger	1
77	(Cambodia) Sath Rozak	Angkor Tiger	1
77	(Cambodia) Moth Sattya	Angkor Tiger	1
77	(Thailand) Sarayut Sompim	Tiffy Army	1
77	(Cambodia) Yang Phomin	Tiffy Army	1
77	(Cambodia) Nat Sangha	Tiffy Army	1
77	(Cambodia) Lim Aarun Raymond	Tiffy Army	1
77	(Japan) Shori Murata	Tiffy Army	1
77	(Cambodia) Choeun Nacha	Tiffy Army	1
77	(Cambodia) Chou Hao	Kirivong Sok Sen Chey	1
77	(Egypt) Mahmoud El Sayed	Kirivong Sok Sen Chey	1
77	(Japan) Hikaru Mizuno	Kirivong Sok Sen Chey	1
77	(Cambodia) Chea Sokheang	Kirivong Sok Sen Chey	1
77	(Japan) Anto Okamura	Kirivong Sok Sen Chey	1
77	(Cambodia) Huy Sophearak	Kirivong Sok Sen Chey	1
77	(Cambodia) Narong Kakada	Preah Khan Reach Svay Rieng	1

=== Own goals ===
As of 22 April 2024.

Player	For	Against	Result	Date
(Kyrgyzstan) Bektur Amangeldiev	Nagaworld	Visakha	1–4 (H)	12 August 2023
(South Korea) Cheon Jin-ryeong	ISI Dangkor Senchey	Preah Khan Reach Svay Rieng	1–2 (H)	26 August 2023
(Japan) Dylan Nobiraki	Kirivong Sok Sen Chey	Nagaworld	1–1 (A)	24 September 2023
(Cambodia) Seut Baraing	Phnom Penh Crown	Prey Veng	3–1 (H)	21 October 2023
(Cameroon) Yannick Francois	Kirivong Sok Sen Chey	Preah Khan Reach Svay Rieng	1–2 (A)	22 October 2023
(Thailand) Sarayut Sompim	Tiffy Army	Nagaworld	1–1 (H)	12 January 2024
(Ivory Coast) Abdel Kader Coulibaly	ISI Dangkor Senchey	Tiffy Army	3–2 (A)	21 April 2024
(Thailand) Sarayut Sompim	Tiffy Army	ISI Dangkor Senchey	3–2 (H)	21 April 2024

=== Top assists ===
As of 13 May 2024.

Rank	Player	Club	Assists
1	(Japan) Ryohei Yoshihama	Boeung Ket	14
2	(Myanmar) Thiha Zaw	Prey Veng	11
2	(Cambodia) Mat Noron	Boeung Ket	11
2	(Cambodia) Nick Taylor	Preah Khan Reach Svay Rieng	11
5	(Cambodia) Yudai Ogawa	Phnom Penh Crown	9
6	(Cambodia) Prak Mony Udom	Preah Khan Reach Svay Rieng	8
6	(Cambodia) Phach Socheavila	Phnom Penh Crown	8
6	(Brazil) Denilson	Phnom Penh Crown	8
6	(Cambodia) Sin Kakada	Visakha	8
6	(Canada) Marcus Haber	Preah Khan Reach Svay Rieng	8
6	(Laos) Bounphachan Bounkong	Preah Khan Reach Svay Rieng	8
12	(Canada) Alessandro Riggi	Angkor Tiger	7
13	(Philippines) Pocholo Bugas	Angkor Tiger	6
13	(Spain) Víctor Blasco	Visakha	6
13	(Brazil) Cristian Roque	Nagaworld	6
13	(Japan) Shori Murata	Tiffy Army	6
13	(Japan) Shintaro Shimizu	Phnom Penh Crown	6
13	(Cambodia) Sath Rosib	Preah Khan Reach Svay Rieng	6

=== Hat-Tricks ===
As of 11 March 2024.

Player	For	Against	Result	Date
(Brazil) Marques Marcio	Nagaworld	Prey Veng	5–4 (A)	5 August 2023
(Canada) Marcus Haber	Preah Khan Reach Svay Rieng	Prey Veng	5–3 (A)	30 September 2023
(Cambodia) Mat Noron^{4}	Boeung Ket	Phnom Penh Crown	5–5 (H)	4 October 2023
(Japan) Tetsuaki Misawa	Tiffy Army	Kirivong Sok Sen Chey	4–2 (H)	26 November 2023
(Canada) Marcus Haber	Preah Khan Reach Svay Rieng	Angkor Tiger	7–1 (A)	16 December 2023
(Japan) Ryohei Yoshihama	Boeung Ket	Kirivong Sok Sen Chey	6–0 (A)	17 December 2023
(Canada) Marcus Haber	Preah Khan Reach Svay Rieng	Visakha	4–3 (H)	23 December 2023
(Spain) Youssef Ezzejjari	Visakha	Kirivong Sok Sen Chey	6–1 (H)	27 January 2024
(Timor-Leste) Jhon Frith	ISI Dangkor Senchey	Angkor Tiger	7–1 (H)	28 January 2024
(Japan) Masatoshi Takeshita^{4}	Prey Veng	Angkor Tiger	5–2 (A)	9 March 2024
(Cambodia) Nhean Sosidan	Tiffy Army	Boeung Ket	5–2 (H)	10 March 2024

Notes

(H) – Home team
(A) – Away team

- ^{4} player scored 4 goals

=== Clean sheets ===
As of 09 May 2024.

Rank	Player	Club	Clean sheets
1	(Cambodia) Vireak Dara	Preah Khan Reach Svay Rieng	9
2	(Cambodia) Um Vichet	Phnom Penh Crown	6
2	(Cambodia) Tha Chanrithy	Boeung Ket	6
4	(Cambodia) Hul Kimhuy	Visakha	5
5	(Cambodia) Saveng Samnang	Phnom Penh Crown	4
6	(Cambodia) Um Sereyroth	Tiffy Army	3
6	(Cambodia) Reth Lyheng	Nagaworld	3
6	(Cambodia) Keo Soksela	Visakha	3
9	(Cambodia) Sang Hankhun	Prey Veng	2
9	(Cambodia) Chheng Chantha	ISI Dangkor Senchey	2
9	(Cambodia) Kong Chanvuthy	ISI Dangkor Senchey	2
9	(Cambodia) Chea Savin	Kirivong Sok Sen Chey	2
13	(Cambodia) Non Nat	Angkor Tiger	1
13	(Cambodia) Yi Bunheng	Angkor Tiger	1
13	(Cambodia) Som Sokundara	Tiffy Army	1
13	(Cambodia) Pich Dara	Tiffy Army	1
13	(Cambodia) Om Oudom	Preah Khan Reach Svay Rieng	1
13	(Cambodia) Sou Yaty	Nagaworld	1
13	(Cambodia) Thout Sarouth	Kirivong Sok Sen Chey	1

== Attendances ==
#	Football club	Average attendance
1	Svay Rieng FC	3,051
2	Phnom Penh Crown FC	1,890
3	Boeung Ket Angkor FC	1,824
4	ISI Dangkor Senchey FC	1,524
5	Visakha FC	1,476
6	Angkor Tiger FC	1,081
7	Prey Veng FC	760
8	Tiffy Army FC	698
9	Nagaworld FC	483
10	Kirivong Sok Sen Chey	329

== See also ==
- 2023–24 Cambodian League 2
- 2023–24 Hun Sen Cup
- 2023 Cambodian League Cup
- 2023 Cambodian Super Cup
