= 2021 C-League =

C-League
- Season: 2021
- Dates: 6 March – 21 November
- Champions: Phnom Penh Crown
- Relegated: Soltilo Angkor
- AFC Cup: Phnom Penh Crown and Visakha
- Matches: 111
- Goals: 412 (3.71 per match)
- Top goalscorer: Marques Marcio 22 goals
- Biggest home win: Prey Veng 6–0 Soltilo Angkor (16 May 2021) Phnom Penh Crown 6–0 Electricite du Cambodge (18 July 2021)
- Biggest away win: Asia Euro United 0–9 Visakha (10 July 2021)
- Highest scoring: Asia Euro United 0–9 Visakha (10 July 2021)
- Longest winning run: Boeung Ket (8 matches)
- Longest unbeaten run: Visakha; Phnom Penh Crown (12 matches each)
- Longest winless run: National Police Commissary (12 matches)
- Longest losing run: Soltilo Angkor (8 matches)
- Highest attendance: 2,532 Phnom Penh Crown 1-0 Boeung Ket
- Lowest attendance: 0

2021 Metfone C-League is the 37th season of the C-League. Contested by 13 clubs, it operates on a system of promotion and relegation with Cambodian Second League. Boeung Ket are the defending champions, while Prey Veng makes its debut as the promoted team from the 2020 Cambodian Second League.

== 2021 season clubs ==
=== Teams ===
Locations of the 2021 C-League teams

| Team | Location | Stadium | Capacity | Previous season |
|---|---|---|---|---|
| Angkor Tiger | Siem Reap Province | SRU Stadium | 5,000 | C-League (10th) |
| Asia Euro United | Kandal Province | AEU Sport Park | 1,500 | C-League (8th) |
| Boeung Ket | Phnom Penh | Cambodia Airways Stadium | 2,000 | C-League (1st) |
| Electricite du Cambodge | Phnom Penh | EDC Stadium | 300 | C-League (12th) |
| Kirivong Sok Sen Chey | Takeo Province | Kirivong Sok Sen Chey Stadium | 500 | C-League (8th) |
| Nagaworld | Phnom Penh | RCAF Old Stadium | 20,000 | C-League (6th) |
| National Police Commissary | Kandal Province | 7NG Stadium | TBD | C-League (9th) |
| Phnom Penh Crown | Phnom Penh | Smart RSN Stadium | 5,000 | C-League (3rd) |
| Preah Khan Reach Svay Rieng | Svay Rieng Province | Svay Rieng Stadium | 2,500 | C-League (2nd) |
| Prey Veng | Prey Veng Province | Prey Veng Stadium | 1,200 | Cambodian Second League (1st) |
| Soltilo Angkor | Siem Reap Province | SRU Stadium | 5,000 | C-League (11th) |
| Tiffy Army | Phnom Penh | RCAF Old Stadium | 20,000 | C-League (4th) |
| Visakha | Phnom Penh | Prince Stadium | 10,000 | C-League (5th) |

=== Personnel and kits ===
| Team | Manager | Captain | Kit manufacturer | Shirt sponsor |
|---|---|---|---|---|
| Angkor Tiger | (Spain) Oriol Mohedano | (Brazil) Eliel da Cruz | (Cambodia) NT Sport | Pocari Sweat, Voltra Motors, Kirisu Farm, Sabay |
| Asia Euro United | (Cambodia) Sok Veasna | (Cambodia) Lay Raksmey | (Cambodia) NT Sport | Asia Euro University |
| Boeung Ket | (Cambodia) Kim Pheakdey | (Cambodia) Chan Vathanaka | (Thailand) EGO Sport | Cambodia Airways |
| Electricite du Cambodge | (Cambodia) Meas Samoeun | (Cambodia) Chhoeung Visinu | (Cambodia) Forward Sportswear | Electricite du Cambodge |
| Kirivong Sok Sen Chey | (Thailand) Ekapob Potisai | (Cambodia) Prak Chanratana | (Cambodia) NT Sport | Vattanac Bank, E-GetS |
| Nagaworld | (Brazil) Jose Alves Borges (Interim) | (Cambodia) Kouch Sokumpheak | (Thailand) FBT | NagaWorld |
| National Police Commissary | (Cambodia) Ung Kanyanith | (Cambodia) Say Piseth | (Cambodia) FAN | General Commissariat of National Police |
| Phnom Penh Crown | (Ukraine) Oleg Starynskyi | (Cambodia) Orn Chanpolin | (Thailand) FBT | Smart Axiata, Pi Pay |
| Preah Khan Reach Svay Rieng | (Republic of Ireland) Conor Nestor | (Cambodia) Soeuy Visal | (Thailand) FBT | Orkide Villa |
| Prey Veng | (Thailand) Thongchai Rungreangles | (Trinidad and Tobago) Seon Power | (Cambodia) Forward Sportswear | Cambodia Beer |
| Soltilo Angkor | (Cambodia) Ouk Sothy | (Cameroon) Yannick Francois | (Cambodia) Forward Sportswear | Queen Legacy Group |
| Tiffy Army | (Cambodia) Hor Sokheng | (Cambodia) Phuong Soksana | (Cambodia) NT Sport | TIFFY |
| Visakha | (Nigeria) Akeeb Tunji Ayoyinka (Interim) | (Cambodia) Keo Sokpheng | (Cambodia) Forward Sportswear | Prince Bank |

== Foreign players ==
The number of foreign players is restricted to five per team. A team can use four foreign players on the field in each game, including at least one player from the AFC region.

Players name in bold indicates the player is registered during the mid-season transfer window.

| Club | Player 1 | Player 2 | Player 3 | Player 4 | AFC Player | Former Players |
|---|---|---|---|---|---|---|
| Angkor Tiger | (Brazil) Eliel da Cruz | (Brazil) Iago | (Belarus) Maksim Taleyko | (Tonga) Ata Inia | (Japan) Kosuke Uchida | |
| Asia Euro United | (Nigeria) Samuel Ajayi | (Nigeria) **Rasheed Omokafe** | (Liberia) **Manuel E Johnson** | (Japan) Yuya Kuriyama | (Japan) Kanta Asami | (Cameroon) Abbee Ndjoo (Brazil) Magson Dourado |
| Boeung Ket | (Cameroon) **Abbee Ndjoo** | (Ivory Coast) Anderson Zogbe | (South Africa) Mothusi Gopane | (Japan) Kenta Yamazaki | (Japan) Hikaru Mizuno | (Serbia) Marko Rajković |
| Electricite du Cambodge* | | | | | | |
| Kirivong Sok Sen Chey | (Brazil) Douglas Tardin | (Brazil) Osmar | (Cameroon) David Julien | (Japan) Reiya Kinoshita | (Japan) Taku Yanagidate | |
| Nagaworld | (Brazil) Marques Marcio | (Spain) Súper | (Moldova) Petru Leucă | | (Japan) Fumiya Kogure | |
| National Police Commissary | (Cameroon) Baldwin Ngwa | (Cameroon) Brian Longnyo | (Japan) Soma Otani | | (Japan) Tsubasa Mitani | (South Africa) Shane Booysen |
| Phnom Penh Crown | (Brazil) Matheus Souza | (Colombia) Andres Nieto | (Ukraine) Valeriy Hryshyn | (Japan) Yudai Ogawa | (Japan) Takaki Ose | |
| Preah Khan Reach Svay Rieng | (Cameroon) Privat Mbarga | (Cameroon) **Emmanuel Mbarga** | (Senegal) Robert Lopez Mendy | (Spain) Mika | (Japan) Daisuke Kobayashi | (Brazil) Thiago Santos (Republic of Ireland) Paddy Barrett |
| Prey Veng | (Brazil) **Magson Dourado** | (Nigeria) **Esoh Paul Omogba** | (Trinidad and Tobago) Seon Power | | (Uzbekistan) Alisher Mirzaev | |
| Soltilo Angkor | (Cameroon) Yannick Francois | (Guinea) **Barry Lelouma** | (Japan) Reo Kageyama | (Japan) Takeo Miyazaki | (Japan) Unno Tomoyuki | (Japan) Kisa Kutsuwada |
| Tiffy Army | (Nigeria) **Okereke Timothy** | (Japan) Rio Sakuma | (Japan) Yuta Kikuchi | | (South Korea) **Ha Chan-young** | (Brazil) Cristiano Sergipano (Nigeria) Dzarma Bata (Japan) Takumu Nishihara (Brazil) Romário |
| Visakha | (Brazil) **Cristian Alex** | (Nigeria) Ajayi Opeyemi Korede | (South Africa) Mohammed Khan | (Canada) Marcus Haber | (South Korea) **Lee Jae-gun** | (Afghanistan) Mustafa Zazai (England) Charlie Machell |

*Note: Electricite du Cambodge do not use foreign players.

Foreign players by confederation
| AFC (21) | Japan (18), South Korea (2), Uzbekistan (1) |
| CAF (19) | Cameroon (7), Nigeria (5), South Africa (3), Ivory Coast (1), Guinea (1), Liberia (1), Senegal (1) |
| CONCACAF (2) | Canada (1), Trinidad and Tobago (1) |
| CONMEBOL (10) | Brazil (9), Colombia (1) |
| OFC (1) | Tonga (1) |
| UEFA (5) | Spain (2), Belarus (1), Moldova (1), Ukraine (1) |

== League table ==
| Pos | Team | Pld | W | D | L | GF | GA | GD | Pts | Qualification or relegation (Note: Due to Covid-19 pandemic, teams are split into two groups (Top 8 and Bottom 5) after each have played 12 matches.) |
|---|---|---|---|---|---|---|---|---|---|---|
| 1 | Phnom Penh Crown | 19 | 13 | 5 | 1 | 54 | 18 | +36 | 44 | Qualification for AFC Cup Group Stage |
| 2 | Preah Khan Reach Svay Rieng | 19 | 13 | 3 | 3 | 58 | 26 | +32 | 42 | |
| 3 | Visakha | 19 | 11 | 7 | 1 | 56 | 19 | +37 | 40 | Qualification for AFC Cup Play-off Round |
| 4 | Nagaworld | 19 | 11 | 4 | 4 | 52 | 34 | +18 | 37 | |
| 5 | Boeung Ket | 19 | 11 | 2 | 6 | 30 | 22 | +8 | 35 | |
| 6 | Angkor Tiger | 19 | 8 | 4 | 7 | 31 | 31 | 0 | 28 | |
| 7 | Tiffy Army | 19 | 6 | 5 | 8 | 25 | 27 | −2 | 23 | |
| 8 | Kirivong Sok Sen Chey | 19 | 4 | 1 | 14 | 22 | 54 | −32 | 13 | |
| 9 | National Police Commissary | 16 | 3 | 5 | 8 | 18 | 32 | −14 | 14 | Relegation to Cambodian Second League |
| 10 | Asia Euro United | 16 | 4 | 2 | 10 | 30 | 49 | −19 | 14 | Relegation to Cambodian Second League |
| 11 | Electricite du Cambodge | 16 | 3 | 4 | 9 | 14 | 44 | −30 | 13 | Relegation to Cambodian Second League |
| 12 | Prey Veng | 16 | 2 | 5 | 9 | 23 | 30 | −7 | 11 | Relegation to Cambodian Second League |
| 13 | Soltilo Angkor | 16 | 1 | 5 | 10 | 12 | 39 | −27 | 8 | Relegation to Cambodian Second League |

Updated to match(es) played on 17 November 2021. Source: CNCC
Rules for classification: 1) Points; 2) Goal difference; 3) Goals scored.

== Results ==
| Home \ Away | ANG | AEU | BOE | ELE | KSS | NAG | POL | PPC | SVA | PRV | SOL | TIF | VIS |
|---|---|---|---|---|---|---|---|---|---|---|---|---|---|
| Angkor Tiger | — | 13 Nov | 1–0 | 3–1 | 2–0 | 1–2 | ~~9 Oct~~ | 0–2 | 16 Oct | | 27 Nov | 3–2 | 1–2 |
| Asia Euro United | 2–2 | — | 1–3 | 16 Oct | | 3–5 | 3–2 | 27 Nov | 3–4 | 11 Dec | 1–0 | 1–2 | 0–9 |
| Boeung Ket | | | — | 27 Nov | 1–0 | 0–1 | 2–0 | 1–2 | 20 Nov | 16 Oct | | 2–0 | 1–5 |
| Electricite du Cambodge | 23 Oct | 0–4 | 0–2 | — | 0–2 | 1–3 | 3–2 | 6 Nov | | 0–0 | 30 Oct | 0–3 | 0–7 |
| Kirivong Sok Sen Chey | | 4–2 | 23 Oct | 20 Nov | — | 2–5 | 6 Nov | 1–2 | 0–6 | 3–0 | | 0–1 | 1–3 |
| Nagaworld | 6 Nov | 30 Oct | | ~~9 Oct~~ | 11 Dec | — | | 20 Nov | | 27 Nov | 13 Nov | 2–2 | 16 Oct |
| National Police Commissary | 0–1 | | 13 Nov | 2–2 | 0–0 | 0–4 | — | 1–4 | 0–5 | 30 Oct | 16 Oct | 1–1 | |
| Phnom Penh Crown | 11 Dec | 5–0 | ~~9 Oct~~ | 6–0 | | 1–1 | 23 Oct | — | 3–3 | 4–1 | | 1–1 | 3–3 |
| Preah Khan Reach Svay Rieng | 1–2 | ~~9 Oct~~ | 1–2 | 6–1 | 13 Nov | 3–1 | 11 Dec | 30 Oct | — | 6 Nov | 2–1 | 3–2 | |
| Prey Veng | 1–1 | 2–4 | 1–3 | 13 Nov | ~~9 Oct~~ | 3–4 | 0–0 | | 1–2 | — | 6–0 | 1–2 | 20 Nov |
| Soltilo Angkor | 0–0 | 0–0 | 0–3 | 0–1 | 1–2 | 3–3 | 3–2 | 1–7 | 23 Oct | | — | 0–3 | 6 Nov |
| Tiffy Army | | | 6 Nov | 11 Dec | 30 Oct | | 20 Nov | 16 Oct | 27 Nov | 23 Oct | ~~9 Oct~~ | — | |
| Visakha | 3–1 | 23 Oct | 11 Dec | | 27 Nov | 2–2 | 1–1 | 13 Nov | 3–2 | 3–2 | 5–0 | 0–0 | — |

Updated to match(es) played on 15 September 2021. Source: Flashscore
Legend: Blue = home team win; Yellow = draw; Red = away team win.

== Season statistics ==
=== Top scorers ===
As of 20 November 2021.

| Rank | Player | Club | Goals |
|---|---|---|---|
| 1 | (Brazil) Marques Marcio | Nagaworld | 22 |
| 2 | (Cameroon) Privat Mbarga | Preah Khan Reach Svay Rieng | 21 |
| 3 | (Canada) Marcus Haber | Visakha | 17 |
| 4 | (Spain) Mika | Preah Khan Reach Svay Rieng | 15 |
| 5 | (Nigeria) Ajayi Opeyemi Korede | Visakha | 14 |
| 6 | (Cambodia) Chan Vathanaka | Boeung Ket | 13 |
| 6 | (Colombia) Andres Nieto | Phnom Penh Crown | 13 |
| 8 | (Cameroon) Abbee Ndjoo | Asia Euro United (10) / Boeung Ket (1) | 11 |
| 8 | (Cambodia) Brak Thiva | Phnom Penh Crown | 11 |
| 10 | (Brazil) Eliel da Cruz | Angkor Tiger | 10 |
| 11 | (Cambodia) Keo Sokpheng | Visakha | 9 |
| 12 | (Brazil) Matheus Souza | Phnom Penh Crown | 8 |
| 13 | (Senegal) Robert Lopez Mendy | Preah Khan Reach Svay Rieng | 7 |
| 14 | (Japan) Soma Otani | National Police Commissary | 6 |
| 14 | (Cambodia) Long Menghav | Angkor Tiger | 6 |
| 14 | (Cambodia) Sa Ty | Electricite du Cambodge | 6 |
| 14 | (Japan) Fumiya Kogure | Nagaworld | 6 |
| 18 | (Japan) Yuta Kikuchi | Tiffy Army | 5 |
| 18 | (Moldova) Petru Leucă | Nagaworld | 5 |
| 18 | (Brazil) Douglas Tardin | Kirivong Sok Sen Chey | 5 |
| 21 | (Cambodia) Ky Rina | Prey Veng | 4 |
| 21 | (Cambodia) Roth Samnang | Soltilo Angkor | 4 |
| 21 | (Ukraine) Valeriy Hryshyn | Phnom Penh Crown | 4 |
| 21 | (Cambodia) Narong Kakada | Tiffy Army | 4 |
| 21 | (Cambodia) Voeun Va | Prey Veng | 4 |
| 21 | (Nigeria) Samuel Ajayi | Asia Euro United | 4 |
| 21 | (Cambodia) Sos Suhana | Nagaworld | 4 |
| 21 | (Cambodia) Lim Pisoth | Phnom Penh Crown | 4 |
| 21 | (Cambodia) Sieng Chanthea | Boeung Ket | 4 |
| 21 | (Cambodia) Dav Nim | Kirivong Sok Sen Chey | 4 |
| 21 | (Cambodia) Orn Chanpolin | Phnom Penh Crown | 4 |
| 21 | (Japan) Reiya Kinoshita | Kirivong Sok Sen Chey | 4 |
| 21 | (Japan) Yudai Ogawa | Phnom Penh Crown | 4 |
| 21 | (Cameroon) Emmanuel Mbarga | Preah Khan Reach Svay Rieng | 4 |
| 35 | (Cambodia) Tang Pisey | Angkor Tiger | 3 |
| 35 | (Cambodia) Nub Tola | Nagaworld | 3 |
| 35 | (Cambodia) Em Phanna | Kirivong Sok Sen Chey | 3 |
| 35 | (Cambodia) Ken Chansopheak | Visakha | 3 |
| 35 | (Cambodia) Ahmath Surim | Prey Veng | 3 |
| 35 | (Cambodia) Nhean Sosidan | Tiffy Army | 3 |
| 35 | (Cambodia) Pring Chetra | Asia Euro United | 3 |
| 35 | (Cambodia) Our Phearon | Boeung Ket | 3 |
| 35 | (Brazil) Osmar | Kirivong Sok Sen Chey | 3 |
| 35 | (Cambodia) Kouch Dani | Nagaworld | 3 |
| 35 | (South Africa) Mothusi Gopane | Boeung Ket | 3 |
| 35 | (Cambodia) Long Phearath | Angkor Tiger | 3 |
| 35 | (Cambodia) Soeuy Visal | Preah Khan Reach Svay Rieng | 3 |
| 47 | (South Africa) Shane Booysen | National Police Commissary | 2 |
| 47 | (Nigeria) Dzarma Bata | Tiffy Army | 2 |
| 47 | (Cambodia) Prak Mony Udom | Preah Khan Reach Svay Rieng | 2 |
| 47 | (Brazil) Cristiano Sergipano | Tiffy Army | 2 |
| 47 | (Cambodia) Ath Ontoch | Prey Veng | 2 |
| 47 | (Brazil) Romário | Tiffy Army | 2 |
| 47 | (Cambodia) Sok Chanraksmey | Asia Euro United | 2 |
| 47 | (Cambodia) Norng Vylik | Soltilo Angkor | 2 |
| 47 | (Cambodia) Reung Bunheing | Visakha | 2 |
| 47 | (Cambodia) Mat Noron | Boeung Ket | 2 |
| 47 | (Cambodia) Yeu Muslim | Phnom Penh Crown | 2 |
| 47 | (Japan) Kanta Asami | Asia Euro United | 2 |
| 47 | (Uzbekistan) Alisher Mirzaev | Prey Veng | 2 |
| 47 | (Cambodia) San Chamrong | Asia Euro United | 2 |
| 47 | (Cameroon) Baldwin Ngwa | National Police Commissary | 2 |
| 47 | (Cambodia) Noun Borey | National Police Commissary | 2 |
| 47 | (Nigeria) Rasheed Omokafe | Asia Euro United | 2 |
| 47 | (Cambodia) Prak Chanratana | Kirivong Sok Sen Chey | 2 |
| 47 | (Belarus) Maksim Taleyko | Angkor Tiger | 2 |
| 47 | (Cambodia) Sin Kakada | Visakha | 2 |
| 47 | (Brazil) Iago Bento | Angkor Tiger | 2 |
| 47 | (Brazil) Cristian Alex | Visakha | 2 |
| 47 | (Cambodia) Som Vannit | National Police Commissary | 2 |
| 47 | (Tonga) Ata Inia | Angkor Tiger | 2 |
| 47 | (Brazil) Magson Dourado | Prey Veng | 2 |
| 47 | (Cambodia) Kouch Sokumpheak | Nagaworld | 2 |
| 71 | (Cambodia) Phach Socheavila | Electricite du Cambodge | 1 |
| 71 | (Cambodia) Khun Sengthai | Electricite du Cambodge | 1 |
| 71 | (Cambodia) Yan Sokha | Electricite du Cambodge | 1 |
| 71 | (Cambodia) Wut Tola | Prey Veng | 1 |
| 71 | (Cambodia) Boris Kok | Phnom Penh Crown | 1 |
| 71 | (Japan) Yuya Kuriyama | Asia Euro United | 1 |
| 71 | (Cambodia) Leng Makara | Nagaworld | 1 |
| 71 | (Cambodia) Chreng Chanvirak | Electricite du Cambodge | 1 |
| 71 | (Cambodia) Ream Serng | Nagaworld | 1 |
| 71 | (Cambodia) Sin Sovannmakara | Prey Veng | 1 |
| 71 | (Cambodia) Leng Nora | Prey Veng | 1 |
| 71 | (Cameroon) Yannick Francois | Soltilo Angkor | 1 |
| 71 | (Cambodia) Reung Bunheing | Visakha | 1 |
| 71 | (South Africa) Mohammed Khan | Visakha | 1 |
| 71 | (Japan) Takaki Ose | Phnom Penh Crown | 1 |
| 71 | (Serbia) Marko Rajković | Boeung Ket | 1 |
| 71 | (Cambodia) Pich Sovankhemarin | Nagaworld | 1 |
| 71 | (Cambodia) Sath Rosib | Boeung Ket | 1 |
| 71 | (Cambodia) Tith Dina | Visakha | 1 |
| 71 | (Japan) Daisuke Kobayashi | Preah Khan Reach Svay Rieng | 1 |
| 71 | (Japan) Reo Kageyama | Soltilo Angkor | 1 |
| 71 | (Cambodia) Chhong Bunnath | Angkor Tiger | 1 |
| 71 | (Cambodia) Chin Vannak | Electricite du Cambodge | 1 |
| 71 | (Cambodia) Chantha Chantheaka | Electricite du Cambodge | 1 |
| 71 | (Cambodia) Thorn Seyha | Angkor Tiger | 1 |
| 71 | (Cambodia) Ny Sokry | Preah Khan Reach Svay Rieng | 1 |
| 71 | (Cambodia) Nen Sothearoth | Nagaworld | 1 |
| 71 | (Cambodia) Vann Vit | Asia Euro United | 1 |
| 71 | (Japan) Kenta Yamazaki | Boeung Ket | 1 |
| 71 | (Cambodia) Khim Borey | Nagaworld | 1 |
| 71 | (Cambodia) Ly Duk | Soltilo Angkor | 1 |
| 71 | (Cambodia) Ol Ravy | National Police Commissary | 1 |
| 71 | (Cambodia) Sin Kakada | Visakha | 1 |
| 71 | (Cambodia) Chrerng Polroth | Visakha | 1 |
| 71 | (Cambodia) Prak Mony Udom | Preah Khan Reach Svay Rieng | 1 |
| 71 | (Cambodia) Pok Roza | Asia Euro United | 1 |
| 71 | (Cambodia) Choeun Nacha | Tiffy Army | 1 |
| 71 | (Cambodia) San Sovathe | Prey Veng | 1 |
| 71 | (Trinidad and Tobago) Seon Power | Prey Veng | 1 |
| 71 | (Nigeria) Esoh Paul Omogba | Prey Veng | 1 |
| 71 | (Cambodia) Prum Sorithea | Asia Euro United | 1 |
| 71 | (Nigeria) Okereke Timothy | Tiffy Army | 1 |
| 71 | (Cambodia) Kan Pisal | Tiffy Army | 1 |
| 71 | (Cambodia) Som Dara | Kirivong Sok Sen Chey | 1 |
| 71 | (Cambodia) Pov Ponvuthy | Phnom Penh Crown | 1 |
| 71 | (Cambodia) Vong Visal | Asia Euro United | 1 |
| 71 | (Cambodia) Sean Sopheaktra | Electricite du Cambodge | 1 |
| 71 | (Cambodia) Ny Mustafa | National Police Commissary | 1 |
| 71 | (Cambodia) Kim Sokyuth | Preah Khan Reach Svay Rieng | 1 |
| 71 | (Cambodia) Phuong Soksana | Tiffy Army | 1 |
| 71 | (South Korea) Ha Chan-young | Tiffy Army | 1 |
| 71 | (Cambodia) Vy Amelin | National Police Commissary | 1 |
| 71 | (Cambodia) Moth Sattya | Angkor Tiger | 1 |
| 71 | (Cambodia) Sophal Dimong | Angkor Tiger | 1 |
| 71 | (Cambodia) Min Ratanak | Preah Khan Reach Svay Rieng | 1 |
| 71 | (Japan) Takeo Miyazaki | Soltilo Angkor | 1 |
| 71 | (Cambodia) Met Samel | Soltilo Angkor | 1 |
| 71 | (Cambodia) Chhoeung Visinu | Electricite du Cambodge | 1 |
| 71 | (Cambodia) Mom Sotheavan | National Police Commissary | 1 |
| 71 | (South Korea) Lee Jae-gun | Visakha | 1 |
| 71 | (Cambodia) Chea Vesly | Boeung Ket | 1 |
| 71 | (Guinea) Barry Lelouma | Soltilo Angkor | 1 |
| 71 | (Spain) Súper | Nagaworld | 1 |

=== Hat-tricks ===
As of 18 November 2021.

| Player | For | Against | Result | Date |
|---|---|---|---|---|
| (Cambodia) Chan Vathanaka | Boeung Ket | Prey Veng | 3–1 | 3 July |
| (Cameroon) Abbee Ndjoo | Asia Euro United | Electricite du Cambodge | 4–0 | 4 July |
| (Brazil) Marques Marcio | Nagaworld | National Police Commissary | 4–0 | 7 July |
| (Canada) Marcus Haber^{4} | Visakha | Asia Euro United | 9–0 | 10 July |
| (Nigeria) Ajayi Opeyemi Korede | Visakha | Soltilo Angkor | 5–0 | 18 July |
| (Cambodia) Brak Thiva | Phnom Penh Crown | Electricite du Cambodge | 6–0 | 18 July |
| (Spain) Mika | Preah Khan Reach Svay Rieng | Tiffy Army | 3–2 | 5 September |
| (Brazil) Marques Marcio | Nagaworld | Kirivong Sok Sen Chey | 5–2 | 11 September |
| (Brazil) Marques Marcio | Nagaworld | Boeung Ket | 4–2 | 3 October |
| (Cameroon) Privat Mbarga^{4} | Preah Khan Reach Svay Rieng | Kirivong Sok Sen Chey | 6–0 | 13 November |

Note:

- ^{4} player scored 4 goals

=== Clean sheets ===
As of 20 November 2021.

| Rank | Player | Club | Clean sheets |
|---|---|---|---|
| 1 | (Cambodia) Keo Soksela | Visakha | 7 |
| 2 | (Cambodia) Saveng Samnang | Phnom Penh Crown | 6 |
| 3 | (Cambodia) Hul Kimhuy | Boeung Ket | 5 |
| 4 | (Cambodia) Vireak Dara | Prey Veng | 4 |
| 4 | (Cambodia) Prak Monyphearun | National Police Commissary | 4 |
| 4 | (Cambodia) Aim Sovannarath | Preah Khan Reach Svay Rieng | 4 |
| 7 | (Cambodia) Kung Chanvuthy | Kirivong Sok Sen Chey | 3 |
| 7 | (Cambodia) Pich Rovinyothin | Asia Euro United | 3 |
| 7 | (Cambodia) Pich Dara | Tiffy Army | 3 |
| 10 | (Cambodia) Chea Vansak | Angkor Tiger | 2 |
| 10 | (Cambodia) Kong Rafat | Tiffy Army | 2 |
| 10 | (Cambodia) Yi Bunheng | Angkor Tiger | 2 |
| 10 | (Cambodia) Som Sokundara | Electricite du Cambodge | 2 |
| 10 | (Cambodia) Oeun Samart | Soltilo Angkor | 2 |
| 15 | (Cambodia) Samrith Seiha | Nagaworld | 1 |
| 15 | (Cambodia) Tha Chanrithy | Boeung Ket | 1 |
| 15 | (Cambodia) Sou Yaty | Nagaworld | 1 |
| 15 | (Cambodia) Thouth Sarouth | Electricite du Cambodge | 1 |

== Awards ==
| Awards | Nation/Name | Club |
|---|---|---|
| Top Scorer | (Brazil) Marques Marcio | Nagaworld |
| Player of the season | (Cameroon) Privat Mbarga | Preah Khan Reach Svay Rieng |
| Goalkeeper of the season | (Cambodia) Saveng Samnang | Phnom Penh Crown |
| Coach of the season | (Ukraine) Oleg Starynskyi | Phnom Penh Crown |

| Awards | Club |
|---|---|
| Fair Play | Boeung Ket |

== See also ==
- 2021 Cambodian Second League
- 2021 Hun Sen Cup
