= 2022 Cambodian Premier League =

Cambodian Premier League
- Season: 2022
- Dates: 5 March – 3 December 2022
- Champions: Phnom Penh Crown (8th title)
- AFC Cup: Phnom Penh Crown
- Matches: 96
- Goals: 348 (3.63 per match)
- Top goalscorer: Marcus Haber (25 goals)
- Biggest home win: Preah Khan Reach Svay Rieng 10–0 Kirivong Sok Sen Chey (13 August)
- Biggest away win: Kirivong Sok Sen Chey 1–5 Phnom Penh Crown (23 July)
- Highest scoring: Preah Khan Reach Svay Rieng 10–0 Kirivong Sok Sen Chey (13 August)
- Longest winning run: 5 matches Preah Khan Reach Svay Rieng
- Longest unbeaten run: 13 matches Preah Khan Reach Svay Rieng
- Longest winless run: 13 matches Kirivong Sok Sen Chey
- Longest losing run: 6 matches Kirivong Sok Sen Chey
- Highest attendance: 4,857; Angkor Tiger 0–0 Boeung Ket (16 July)

2022 Cambodian Premier League is the 38th season of the Cambodian Premier League, the top Cambodian professional league for association football clubs, since its establishment in 1982.

Eight teams will be competing in a triple round-robin match. 5 teams that are National Police Commissary, Asia Euro United, Electricite du Cambodge, Prey Veng, and Soltilo Angkor are relegated to the Cambodian League 2 because they did not fulfill the Cambodian Football League Company's requirements. The season began on 5 March 2022.

Phnom Penh Crown were the defending champions and successfully defended their title, winning their 2nd consecutive title and 8th title overall.

== Teams ==
Locations of the 2022 Cambodian Premier League teams

Team	Location	Stadium	Capacity	Previous season
Angkor Tiger	Siem Reap Province	Hanuman Stadium	5,030	C-League (6th)
Boeung Ket	Phnom Penh	Cambodia Airways Stadium	2,138	C-League (5th)
Kirivong Sok Sen Chey	Takéo Province	Kirivong Sok Sen Chey Stadium	350	C-League (8th)
Nagaworld	Kampong Speu Province	Kampong Speu Stadium	2,400	C-League (4th)
Phnom Penh Crown	Phnom Penh	Smart RSN Stadium	5,010	C-League (1st)
Preah Khan Reach Svay Rieng	Svay Rieng Province	Svay Rieng Stadium	2,060	C-League (2nd)
Tiffy Army	Phnom Penh	RCAF Old Stadium	14,750	C-League (7th)
Visakha	Phnom Penh	Prince Stadium	15,000	C-League (3rd)

=== Personnel and kits ===
Team	Manager	Captain	Kit manufacturer	Shirt sponsor
Angkor Tiger	(England) Alistair Heath	(Cambodia) Sophal Dimong	(Cambodia) NT Sport	Pocari Sweat, Voltra Motors, Kirisu Farm, Sabay
Boeung Ket	(Cambodia) Hao Socheat (Interim)	(Brazil) Alexandre Cardoso	(Thailand) EGO Sport	Cambodia Airways
Kirivong Sok Sen Chey	(Spain) Manuel Retamero	(Cambodia) Chhing Sokphanny	(Cambodia) NT Sport	Krud Beer
Nagaworld	(Cambodia) Khim Borey	(Cambodia) Kouch Sokumpheak	(Thailand) FBT	NagaWorld
Phnom Penh Crown	(Ukraine) Oleg Starynskyi	(Cambodia) Orn Chanpolin	(Thailand) FBT	Smart Axiata, Pi Pay
Preah Khan Reach Svay Rieng	(Republic of Ireland) Conor Nestor	(Cambodia) Soeuy Visal	(Thailand) FBT	Orkide Villa
Tiffy Army	(Cambodia) Hor Sokheng	(Cambodia) Thourng Da	(Cambodia) NT Sport	TIFFY
Visakha	(Cambodia) Meas Channa	(Cambodia) Keo Sokpheng	(Cambodia) Forward Sportswear	Prince Bank

== Foreign players ==
The number of foreign players is restricted to 5 per team. A team can use 4 foreign players on the field in each game, including at least 1 player from the AFC region.

Players name in bold indicates the player is registered during the mid-season transfer window.

Club	Player 1	Player 2	Player 3	Player 4	AFC Player	Former Players
Angkor Tiger	(Brazil) Gabriel Silva	(Brazil) Iago Bento	(Republic of Ireland) Jozsef Keaveny	(Japan) Soh Narita	(Timor-Leste) **Mouzinho**	(Japan) Naoki Maeda
Boeung Ket	(Afghanistan) Mustafa Zazai	(Brazil) Alexandre Cardoso	(Finland) Sakari Tukiainen	(Nigeria) Ajayi Opeyemi Korede	(Iran) Taher Jahanbakhsh	
Kirivong Sok Sen Chey	(Cameroon) David Koum	(Montenegro) **Marko Ivanovic**	(Timor-Leste) Thiago Fernandes		(Japan) **Motohiro Kaneshiro**	(Ghana) Robert Ghansah (Uzbekistan) Sukhrob Rakhmonov (Philippines) OJ Porteria
Nagaworld	(Brazil) Cristian Roque	(Brazil) Eliel da Cruz	(Ivory Coast) **Anderson Zogbe**	(Spain) Súper	(Japan) Fumiya Kogure	
Phnom Penh Crown	(Afghanistan) Fareed Sadat	(Colombia) Andres Nieto	(Japan) Takaki Ose	(Ukraine) Valeriy Hryshyn	(Japan) Yudai Ogawa	(Japan) Daisuke Kobayashi
Preah Khan Reach Svay Rieng	(Canada) Marcus Haber	(Spain) **Victor Blasco**	(Republic of Ireland) Clyde O'Connell	(Japan) Hikaru Mizuno	(Japan) Takashi Odawara	(Cameroon) Emmanuel Mbarga
Tiffy Army	(Japan) Takumu Nishihara	(Japan) Reiya Kinoshita	(Japan) **Daisuke Kobayashi**	(United States) **Jonny Campbell**	(Japan) Yuta Kikuchi	(Ivory Coast) Ibrahim Abou Dicko (Egypt) Elsayed Mahmoud
Visakha	(Brazil) Marcos Vinícius	(Brazil) Paulo Victor	(South Korea) Lee Jae-gun	(Trinidad and Tobago) **Seon Power**	(Uzbekistan) **Alisher Mirzaev**	(Brazil) Junior Barros (South Sudan) Kenny Athiu (South Africa) Mohammed Khan

Foreign players by confederation
AFC (18)	Japan (11), Afghanistan (2), Timor Leste (2), Iran (1), South Korea (1), Uzbekistan (1)
CAF (3)	Cameroon (1), Ivory Coast (1), Nigeria (1)
CONCACAF (3)	Canada (1), Trinidad & Tobago (1), United States (1)
CONMEBOL (8)	Brazil (7), Colombia (1)
UEFA (7)	Ireland (2), Spain (2), Finland (1), Montenegro (1), Ukraine (1)

=== Players holding Cambodian dual citizenship ===
Cambodian dual nationals do not take up foreign players quota.

Club	Player 1	Player 2	Player 3	Player 4
Angkor Tiger				
Boeung Ket				
Kirivong Sok Sen Chey	(New Zealand) Lim Aarun Raymond			
Nagaworld	(France) Dani Kouch	(Vietnam) Ream Serng	(Vietnam) Dav Nim	(Thailand) Nhoem Lyhuor
Phnom Penh Crown				
Preah Khan Reach Svay Rieng				
Tiffy Army				
Visakha	(France) Thierry Chantha Bin	(France) Rath Virak	(Ghana) Leng Nora	(Thailand) Phan Ort

== Regular season ==
=== League table ===
Pos	Team	Pld	W	D	L	GF	GA	GD	Pts	Qualification or relegation
1	Preah Khan Reach Svay Rieng	21	14	4	3	54	18	+36	46	Qualification for Championship round
2	Visakha	21	12	4	5	46	23	+23	40	Qualification for Championship round
3	Phnom Penh Crown	21	10	6	5	47	28	+19	36	Qualification for Championship round
4	Boeung Ket	21	10	5	6	41	28	+13	35	Qualification for Championship round
5	Nagaworld	21	8	5	8	23	28	−5	29	
6	Tiffy Army	21	6	5	10	35	32	+3	23	
7	Angkor Tiger	21	6	3	12	35	61	−26	21	
8	Kirivong Sok Sen Chey (Q)	21	1	2	18	21	84	−63	5	Qualification to relegation play-offs

Updated to match(es) played on 22 October 2022. Source: FIFA Soccerway Cambodian Premier League
Rules for classification: 1) Points; 2) Head to Head; 3) Goal difference; 4) Goals scored
(Q) Qualified for the phase indicated

=== Results ===
Home \ Away	ANG	BOE	NAG	KSS	PPC	SVA	TIF	VIS
Angkor Tiger	—	0–0	4–3	3–3	4–2	0–4	5–4	1–3
Boeung Ket	2–0	—	3–1	6–0	2–1	0–1	0–1	3–2
Nagaworld	0–2	1–0	—	2–1	1–4	0–1	1–1	1–0
Kirivong Sok Sen Chey	3–3	0–4	1–2	—	1–5	1–4	1–0	1–2
Phnom Penh Crown	3–2	2–2	0–0	6–1	—	1–3	1–0	0–0
Preah Khan Reach Svay Rieng	4–1	4–0	1–1	3–1	1–0	—	1–1	0–1
Tiffy Army	5–1	3–4	0–1	5–1	0–0	1–3	—	0–3
Visakha	5–2	1–2	2–0	5–0	3–1	1–2	0–1	—

Updated to match(es) played on 9 July 2022. Source: Flashscore
Legend: Blue = home team win; Yellow = draw; Red = away team win.

The second-round date will be announced after all first-round matches are played.

Some matches will be updated

== Championship round ==
=== League table ===
Pos	Team	Pld	W	D	L	GF	GA	GD	Pts	Qualification or relegation
1	Phnom Penh Crown (C)	27	15	7	5	66	36	+30	52 (Note: Head-to-head points: Phnom Penh Crown 8, Visakha 5.)	Qualification for AFC Cup Play-Off Round
2	Visakha	27	16	4	7	60	34	+26	52	
3	Preah Khan Reach Svay Rieng	27	15	4	8	59	29	+30	49	
4	Boeung Ket	27	11	6	10	48	44	+4	39	

Updated to match(es) played on 3 December 2022. Source: FIFA Soccerway Cambodian Premier League
Rules for classification: 1) Points; 2) Head to Head; 3) Goal difference; 4) Goals scored
(C) Champions

=== Results ===
Home \ Away	BOE	PPC	SVA	VIS
Boeung Ket	—	1–1	2–1	1–2
Phnom Penh Crown	5–0	—	1–0	4–3
Preah Khan Reach Svay Rieng	2–1	2–5	—	0–1
Visakha	5–3	2–3	1–0	—

Updated to match(es) played on 3 December 2022. Source: Flashscore
Legend: Blue = home team win; Yellow = draw; Red = away team win.

== Season statistics ==
=== Top scorers ===
As of 04 December 2022.

Rank	Player	Club	Goals
1	(Canada) Marcus Haber	Preah Khan Reach Svay Rieng	25
2	(Japan) Takumu Nishihara	Tiffy Army	21
3	(Afghanistan) (Finland) Fareed Sadat	Phnom Penh Crown	19
4	(Brazil) Paulo Victor	Visakha	15
5	(Finland) Sakari Tukiainen	Boeung Ket	12
5	(Colombia) Andres Nieto	Phnom Penh Crown	12
7	(Brazil) Gabriel Silva	Angkor Tiger	11
7	(Cambodia) Lim Pisoth	Phnom Penh Crown	11
9	(Cambodia) Sieng Chanthea	Boeung Ket	10
10	(Brazil) Iago Bento	Angkor Tiger	7
10	(Brazil) Cristian	Nagaworld	7
10	(Cambodia) Mat Noron	Boeung Ket	7
13	(Republic of Ireland) Jozsef Keaveny	Angkor Tiger	6
13	(Cambodia) Min Ratanak	Preah Khan Reach Svay Rieng	6
13	(Cambodia) Sa Ty	Visakha	6
13	(Nigeria) Ajayi Opeyemi Korede	Boeung Ket	6
13	(South Korea) Lee Jae-gun	Visakha	6
13	(Cambodia) Ouk Sovann	Visakha	6
13	(Brazil) Marcos Vinícius	Visakha	6
20	(Republic of Ireland) Clyde O'Connell	Preah Khan Reach Svay Rieng	5
20	(Japan) Motohiro Kaneshiro	Kirivong Sok Sen Chey	5
20	(Japan) Yudai Ogawa	Phnom Penh Crown	5
23	(Cambodia) Im Somoun	Kirivong Sok Sen Chey	4
23	(Japan) Yuta Kikuchi	Tiffy Army	4
23	(Brazil) Eliel da Cruz	Nagaworld	4
23	(Afghanistan) (Germany) Mustafa Zazai	Boeung Ket	4
23	(Japan) Hikaru Mizuno	Preah Khan Reach Svay Rieng	4
28	(Cambodia) Long Phearath	Preah Khan Reach Svay Rieng	3
28	(Cambodia) Cheng Meng	Visakha	3
28	(Uzbekistan) Alisher Mirzaev	Visakha	3
28	(Cambodia) Wut Tola	Visakha	3
28	(Cambodia) Narong Kakada	Tiffy Army	3
28	(Cambodia) Chhom Sokhay	Phnom Penh Crown	3
28	(Cambodia) Kim Sokyuth	Preah Khan Reach Svay Rieng	3
28	(Cambodia) Sovan Dauna	Angkor Tiger	3
28	(Cambodia) Yeu Muslim	Phnom Penh Crown	3
28	(Cameroon) David Koum	Kirivong Sok Sen Chey	3
28	(Cambodia) Sos Suhana	Nagaworld	3
28	(Cambodia) Choun Chanchav	Phnom Penh Crown	3
28	(Cambodia) Keo Sokpheng	Visakha	3
28	(Cambodia) Our Phearon	Boeung Ket	3
28	(Ukraine) Valeriy Hryshyn	Phnom Penh Crown	3
43	(Cambodia) Sareth Krya	Preah Khan Reach Svay Rieng	2
43	(Spain) Víctor Blasco	Preah Khan Reach Svay Rieng	2
43	(Philippines) OJ Porteria	Kirivong Sok Sen Chey	2
43	(Cameroon) Emmanuel Mbarga	Preah Khan Reach Svay Rieng	2
43	(Cambodia) Ken Chansopheak	Visakha	2
43	(Cambodia) Mao Piseth	Angkor Tiger	2
43	(Timor-Leste) Mouzinho	Angkor Tiger	2
43	(Cambodia) Keo Oudom	Nagaworld	2
43	(Japan) Reiya Kinoshita	Tiffy Army	2
43	(Cambodia) Kouch Sokumpheak	Nagaworld	2
52	(Cambodia) Chrerng Polroth	Visakha	1
52	(Iran) Taher Jahanbakhsh	Boeung Ket	1
52	(Cambodia) Hort Chhenchen	Kirivong Sok Sen Chey	1
52	(Cambodia) Chou Sinti	Preah Khan Reach Svay Rieng	1
52	(South Africa) Mohammed Khan	Visakha	1
52	(Cambodia) Chin Nareak	Angkor Tiger	1
52	(Ivory Coast) Ibrahim Abou Dicko	Tiffy Army	1
52	(Cambodia) Nhean Sosidan	Tiffy Army	1
52	(Cambodia) Nu Chenmakara	Angkor Tiger	1
52	(Ghana) Robert Ghansah	Kirivong Sok Sen Chey	1
52	(Japan) Takashi Odawara	Preah Khan Reach Svay Rieng	1
52	(Cambodia) Ean Ponleu	Kirivong Sok Sen Chey	1
52	(Japan) Fumiya Kogure	Nagaworld	1
52	(Cambodia) Taing Bunchhai	Boeung Ket	1
52	(Cambodia) Chea Sokheang	Kirivong Sok Sen Chey	1
52	(Montenegro) Marko Ivanovic	Kirivong Sok Sen Chey	1
52	(Cambodia) Long Menghav	Tiffy Army	1
52	(Cambodia) Pom Baraing	Boeung Ket	1
52	(Cambodia) Ky Rina	Visakha	1
52	(Cambodia) Moth Sattya	Angkor Tiger	1
52	(Cambodia) Som Ol Tina	Phnom Penh Crown	1
52	(Cambodia) Dav Nim	Nagaworld	1
52	(Cambodia) Op Kamol	Tiffy Army	1
52	(Cambodia) Sor Piseth	Tiffy Army	1
52	(Cambodia) San Kimheng	Boeung Ket	1
52	(Cambodia) Brak Thiva	Phnom Penh Crown	1
52	(Cambodia) Prak Mony Udom	Preah Khan Reach Svay Rieng	1
52	(Cambodia) Kouch Dani	Nagaworld	1
52	(Cambodia) Chung Sokha	Kirivong Sok Sen Chey	1
52	(Cambodia) Ny Sokry	Preah Khan Reach Svay Rieng	1
52	(Cambodia) Sok Samnang	Preah Khan Reach Svay Rieng	1
52	(Cambodia) Teath Kimheng	Visakha	1
52	(Trinidad and Tobago) Seon Power	Visakha	1
52	(Cambodia) Soeuy Visal	Preah Khan Reach Svay Rieng	1
52	(Cambodia) Sin Kakada	Visakha	1
52	(Japan) Takaki Ose	Phnom Penh Crown	1
52	(Ivory Coast) Anderson Zogbe	Nagaworld	1
52	(Cambodia) Chea Vesly	Boeung Ket	1
52	(Cambodia) Prak Mony Udom	Preah Khan Reach Svay Rieng	1

=== Hat-tricks ===
As of 28 August 2022.

Player	For	Against	Result	Date
(Canada) Marcus Haber	Preah Khan Reach Svay Rieng	Tiffy Army	3–1 (A)	26 March 2022
(Japan) Takumu Nishihara	Tiffy Army	Angkor Tiger	4–5 (A)	2 April 2022
(Colombia) Andres Nieto	Phnom Penh Crown	Kirivong Sok Sen Chey	6–1 (H)	2 April 2022
(Japan) Takumu Nishihara^{5}	Tiffy Army	Kirivong Sok Sen Chey	5–1 (H)	23 April 2022
(Japan) Takumu Nishihara	Tiffy Army	Angkor Tiger	5–1 (H)	23 July 2022
(Finland) Sakari Tukiainen	Boeung Ket	Kirivong Sok Sen Chey	4–0 (A)	30 July 2022
(Cambodia) Min Ratanak^{4}	Preah Khan Reach Svay Rieng	Kirivong Sok Sen Chey	10–0 (H)	13 August 2022
(Brazil) Paulo Victor	Visakha	Kirivong Sok Sen Chey	6–1 (H)	27 August 2022

Notes

(H) – Home team
(A) – Away team

- ^{4} player scored 4 goals
- ^{5} player scored 5 goals

=== Clean sheets ===
As of 04 December 2022.

Rank	Player	Club	Clean sheets
1	(Cambodia) Saveng Samnang	Phnom Penh Crown	9
2	(Cambodia) Om Oudom	Preah Khan Reach Svay Rieng	8
3	(Cambodia) Sou Yaty	Nagaworld	6
4	(Cambodia) Hul Kimhuy	Boeung Ket	5
5	(Cambodia) Vireak Dara	Visakha	4
6	(Cambodia) Um Vichet	Tiffy Army	3
6	(Cambodia) Keo Soksela	Visakha	3
8	(Cambodia) Koy Salim	Boeung Ket	1
8	(Cambodia) Non Nat	Angkor Tiger	1
8	(Cambodia) Tha Chanrithy	Kirivong Sok Sen Chey	1
8	(Cambodia) Yi Bunheng	Angkor Tiger	1
8	(Cambodia) Pich Dara	Tiffy Army	1

== Controversies ==
After Angkor Tiger supporters threw bottles at the referee in protest of his choice not to award a penalty to their teams against Preah Khan Reach Svay Rieng on Matchday 13, they were prohibited from competing at their home stadium. The decision was overturned, however, as Angkor Tiger was permitted to play in their home stadium but spectators were prohibited from attending and the clubs were required to pay a fine.

== Awards ==
Month	Players of the months		Ref.
Month	Player	Club	Ref.
March	(Cameroon) Emmanuel Mbarga	Preah Khan Reach Svay Rieng	
April	(Japan) Takumu Nishihara	Tiffy Army	
July	(Canada) (Austria) Marcus Haber	Preah Khan Reach Svay Rieng	
August	(Cambodia) Lim Pisoth	Phnom Penh Crown	
October	(Cambodia) Sieng Chanthea	Boeung Ket	
November	(Cambodia) Lim Pisoth	Phnom Penh Crown	

== See also ==
- 2022 Cambodian League 2
- 2022 Hun Sen Cup
