= Takaki Ose =

Cambodian footballer (born 1994)

Takaki Ose 大瀬 貴己 តាកាគី អូសេ
Personal information
- Full name: Takaki Ose
- Date of birth: 19 October 1995 (age 31)
- Place of birth: Ōme, Japan
- Height: 1.82 m (6 ft 0 in)
- Position: Defender

Team information
- Current team: Preah Khan Reach Svay Rieng
- Number: 3

Youth career
- Jissen Gakuen High School

College career
Years	Team	Apps	(Gls)
–2018	Senshu University		

Senior career*
Years	Team	Apps	(Gls)
2018	HBO Tokyo		
2018–2019	Pietà Hotspurs	20	(0)
2019	Ahli Sidab		
2019–2020	Angkor Tiger		
2020–2025	Phnom Penh Crown	71	(2)
2025–2026	BG Pathum United	16	(0)
2026–	Preah Khan Reach Svay Rieng	5	(1)

International career^{‡}
2024–	Cambodia	9	(0)
Medal record
Men's football
Representing Cambodia
FIFA ASEAN Challenge Cup
Runner-up	2026 Hong Kong
- * Club domestic league appearances and goals as of 9 November 2026 ‡ National team caps and goals as of 26 October 2026

Takaki Ose (大瀬 貴己, Ōse Takaki; Khmer: តាកាគី អូសេ); born 19 October 1995) is a professional footballer who plays as a defender for Cambodian Premier League club Preah Khan Reach Svay Rieng. Born in Japan, he plays for the Cambodia national team.

== Club career ==
=== Youth ===
As a child, Ose attended Jissen Gakuen High School in Japan, where he played for the football team. Subsequently, he attended Senshu University in Japan, where he played for the football team.

=== HBO Tokyo ===
In 2018, Ose started his senior career with Japanese side HBO Tokyo.

=== Pietà Hotspurs ===
Ahead of the 2018–19 season, Ose signed for Maltese side Pietà Hotspurs in August 2018, where he became friends with Japanese footballer Taisei Marukawa in the league. He make his professional career debut on 17 August in a 2–1 lost against Hibernians.

=== Ahli Sidab ===
One year later in September 2019, Ose signed for Omani club Ahli Sidab.

=== Angkor Tiger ===
Six months later, Ose signed for Cambodian side Angkor Tiger, before signing for Cambodian side Phnom Penh Crown in 2021, helping the club win that year's league title and the 2022 Cambodian Super Cup.

=== Phnom Penh Crown ===
On 12 December 2020, Ose signed with Cambodian giants Phnom Penh Crown ahead of the 2021 season. He helped the club to win the 2021 league title at the end of the season. On 24 June 2022, Ose make his AFC Cup debut against Singaporean club Hougang United in a 4–3 lost.

=== BG Pathum United ===
After spending five years with Phnom Penh Crown making 96 appearances with the club, Ose moved to Thailand to sign with Thai League 1 club BG Pathum United on 7 July 2025. He left the club at the end of 2025–26 season.

=== Preah Khan Reach Svay Rieng ===
After spending a season in Thailand, Ose signed two years contract with Preah Khan Reach Svay Rieng on 12 June 2026.

== International career ==
In November 2024, Ose was called up by the Cambodia national team in preparation for the 2024 ASEAN Championship. He make his debut for Cambodia in a 2–2 draw against Malaysia on 8 December 2024.

== Style of play ==
Ose can play as a defender or as a midfielder and is right-footed. Former Phnom Penh Crown manager Oleg Starynskyi described him as a "very technical player".

== Honours ==
=== Phnom Penh Crown ===
- Cambodian Premier League: 2021, 2022
- Hun Sen Cup: 2025
- Cambodian League Cup: 2022, 2023
- Cambodian Super Cup: 2022, 2023
