= Chhom Pisa =

Cambodian footballer

Personal information
- Full name: Chhom Pisa
- Date of birth: 3 March 1995 (age 31)
- Place of birth: Battambang, Cambodia
- Height: 1.70 m (5 ft 7 in)
- Position: Centre-back

Team information
- Current team: Phnom Penh Crown
- Number: 39

Senior career*
Years	Team	Apps	(Gls)
2014–2017	Phnom Penh Crown		
2018–2020	Angkor Tiger		
2021–	Phnom Penh Crown	75	(0)

International career
2017	Cambodia U23		
2017–	Cambodia	5	(0)
- * Club domestic league appearances and goals as of 18 May 2026

Chhom Pisa (born 3 March 1995) is a Cambodian professional footballer who plays as a centre-back for Cambodian Premier League club Phnom Penh Crown and the Cambodia national team.

== Honours ==
=== Club ===
Phnom Penh Crown

- Cambodian Premier League: 2014, 2015, 2021, 2022
- Hun Sen Cup: 2024–25
- Cambodian Super Cup: 2022, 2023
- Cambodian League Cup: 2022, 2023
