= Raul Feher =

Romanian footballer (born 1997)

Personal information
- Full name: Raul Mihai Feher
- Date of birth: 12 March 1997 (age 29)
- Place of birth: Zalău, Romania
- Height: 1.90 m (6 ft 3 in)
- Position: Centre-back

Team information
- Current team: Phnom Penh Crown
- Number: 5

Youth career
- –2016: CE Cervera

Senior career*
| Years | Team | Apps | (Gls) |
| 2016–2017 | Balaguer | 3 | (1) |
| 2017–2019 | Lleida B | 44 | (1) |
| 2019 | Lleida | 0 | (0) |
| 2019–2021 | Andorra | 4 | (0) |
| 2020 | → Inter Club d'Escaldes (loan) | 2 | (0) |
| 2020–2021 | → Ibiza Islas Pitiusas (loan) | 16 | (1) |
| 2021–2022 | Ibiza Islas Pitiusas | 8 | (0) |
| 2022–2025 | Inter Club d'Escaldes | 87 | (9) |
| 2025– | Phnom Penh Crown | 34 | (8) |
- * Club domestic league appearances and goals as of 9 November 2026

Raul Mihai Feher (born 12 March 1997) is a Romanian professional footballer who plays as a centre-back for Cambodian Premier League club Phnom Penh Crown.

== Honours ==
Inter Club d'Escaldes

- Primera Divisió: 2021–22, 2024–25
- Copa Constitució: 2023, 2025
- Andorran Supercup: 2022, 2023

Phnom Penh Crown

- Cambodian Super Cup runner-up: 2025
