= Sam Schweingruber =

Swiss football coach and he is not very liked by his class 1a

Personal information
- Full name: Samuel Schweingruber
- Place of birth: Switzerland

Senior career*
Years	Team	Apps	(Gls)
- FC Münsterlingen
- FC Oberglatt
- FC Pfyn
2003	Mild Seven Cambodia		

Managerial career
- Royal Cambodia Navy
- Khmer Empire
- 2009–2013: Cambodia (women)
- 2013: Cambodia U16
- 2012–2016: Phnom Penh Crown
- * Club domestic league appearances and goals

Sam Schweingruber is a Swiss football coach. He was the first manager of the Cambodia women's national team.

== Career ==
=== Playing career ===
In his playing days, Schweingruber played at Swiss third-division sides Munsterlingen, Oberglatt, and Pfyn. Leaving Switzerland to go gallivanting around the globe, he felt attached to Cambodia where he played for the Mild Seven team. For a monthly salary, they paid him 30 US dollars and a cigarette packet. Later, he became their head coach.

=== Coaching ===
Despite Sam Schweingruber committing himself to fight against corruption, Phnom Penh Crown had been torn asunder after unfalsified voice recordings showed that seven players and four staff were involved in perpetrating a match manipulation scandal. Since this happened, Phnom Penh Crown were not allowed to take part in the 2017 AFC Cup. Later, the club were cleared of match-fixing as Sam Schweingruber and the club were trying to fight it by launching an investigation to uncover those who were trying to alter the results. Two days after winning the 2015 Cambodian League with Phnom Penh Crown, Schweingruber was involved in a serious motorcycle crash and was rushed to hospital where he remained for several days in a perilous condition. Shortly after, his condition worsened and he was flown to Bangkok. There, he drifted in and out of a coma-like state. Thankfully for him, his condition later started to improve- allowing him to be sent back home to Switzerland to enter a recovery facility in mid-January 2016. It was an experience which made him re-examine his whole life. After he finally recovered, the coach made the ultimate decision to return to Cambodia where his five-year-old son lived, a decision his family were against. His president informed him that if he returned 'there would be a 20 percent chance he would be killed' but he did anyway.

Oriol Mohedano was coach of Phnom Penh Crown in the period the Swiss manager was hospitalized.

The former player is among Phnom Penh Crown's most successful coaches, having won back-to-back Cambodian League titles in 2015.

=== FIFA ===
Aside from coaching, Schweingruber is a FIFA Grassroots Development Officer who instructed a FIFA Grassroots Course in the Philippines in 2015.

=== Organizations ===
Way back in 2006, Schweingruber's helmet was stolen by a youth who was under the influence of drugs so Schweingruber endeavoured to establish an academy which would help Cambodian youth development, calling it the SALT Academy. This academy teaches football and life skills to children from families in rural Cambodia The SALT Academy also contains a group called the Mighty Girls which specializes in teaching girls football.

== Coaching Achievements ==
- Cambodian League(2): 2014, 2015
