= Sean Sainsbury =

English football coach active in southeast Asia

Personal information
- Full name: Sean Luke Sainsbury
- Place of birth: England

Managerial career
- Years: Team
- 2012–2015: Muangthong United (youth)
- 2015: Pattaya United
- 2017–2018: Phnom Penh Crown
- 2018–2019: Bangkok
- 2019–: Buriram United (B)

Sean Sainsbury is an English football coach. He has over 20 years of coaching experience and holds a UEFA 'A' License and degrees in sport science and psychology.

== Coaching career ==
Sean Luke Sainsbury started his coaching career in England working for both Fulham FC and Crystal Palace FC youth academies. He also worked in semi professional football for Tooting and Mitcham United and Carshalton Athletic. During his time coaching in the UK he worked with players such as Michail Antonio, Wilf Zaha, Victor Moses and Jonny Williams.

He later moved to Thailand taking the role of academy manager at Muangthong United before becoming the club's technical director and later reserve team head coach. Pattaya United was Sean's next stop, where he was signed to be the club's 1st team head coach.

During his time as academy director and B Team head coach at Muangthong United FC, 32 players went on to play in Thailand's top league and 10 players have become senior Thai National Team players. It was reported that Muangthong United has sold players from their academy and B team to other clubs in Thailand for transfer fees in excess of US $6,000,000. The highest profile of these players being 2019 season Thai League 1 MVP and League Champion, Phitiwat Sukjitthammakul.

In 2017 Sean moved to Cambodia assuming the role of technical director for Phnom Penh Crown following the abrogation of Ukrainian Oleg Starynskyi's contract, Sainsbury was re-appointed as head coach nine days later, taking charge of the team for their last three remaining games (for the 2017 season) against Western Phnom Penh, National Police Commissary and Svay Rieng FC. Sean remained as head coach at Phnom Penh Crown FC for the entire 2018 season helping 12 players from his squad establish themselves as senior national team players.

Sean signed a contract to take the role of head coach at Bangkok FC for the start of the 2019 season. Under new ownership the club signed Sean, bringing him back to Thailand, where he had previously worked for four seasons.

At the end of the 2019 season, after helping Bangkok FC to a fifth-place finish in the league, Sean was recruited by Buriram United. He signed with them as the head coach of their B team in October 2019, a similar role he held during his time at Muangthong United. Sean's first competitive games for Buriram came in 2019 in the Coke Cup U19 tournament and in February 2020 Buriram United were crowned Coke Cup Champions, going unbeaten in 10 games under Sean's leadership.
