= Jorrin John =

Footballer (born 1991)

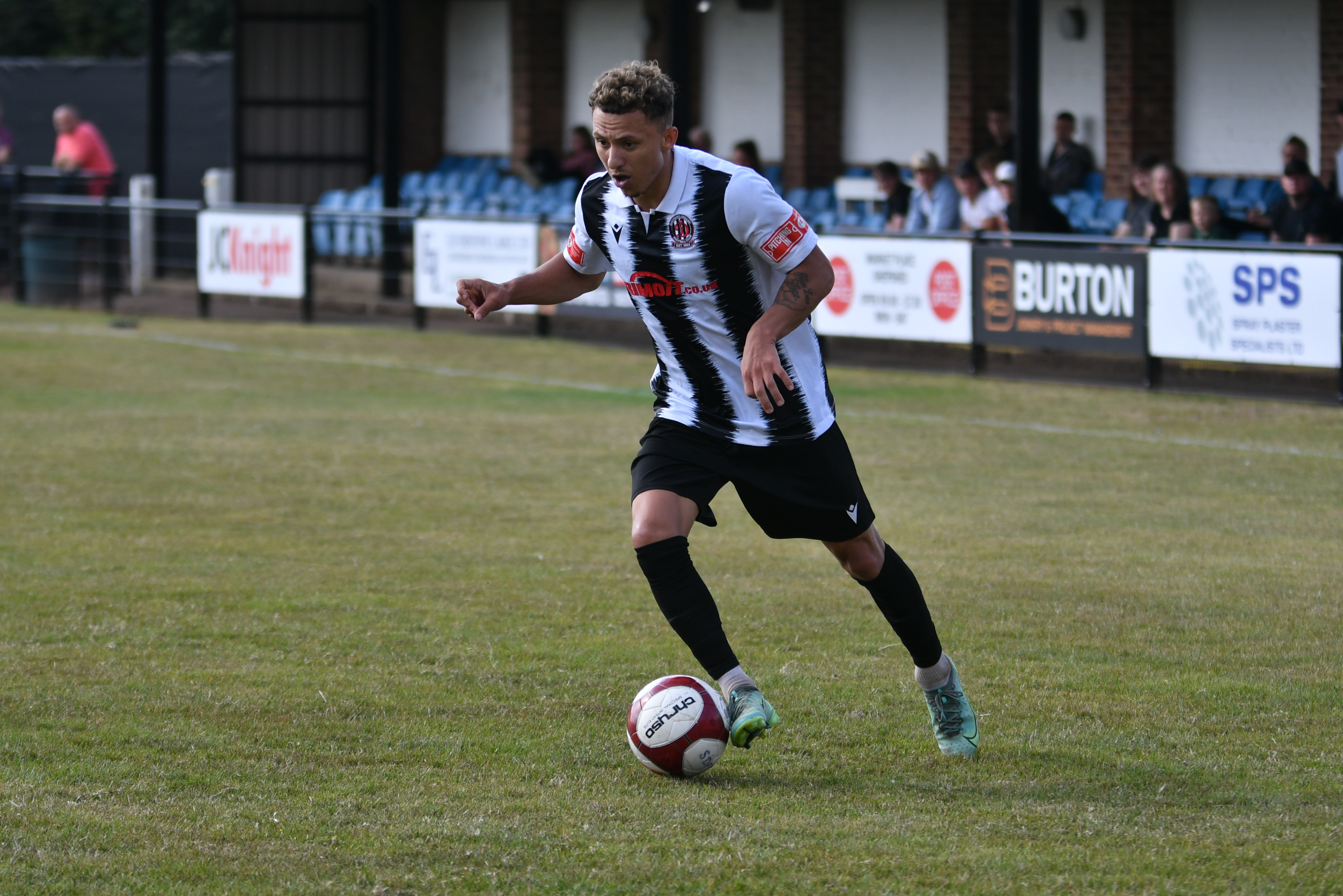
- John in 2022

Personal information
- Full name: Jorrin Nemiah John
- Date of birth: 6 November 1990 (age 36)
- Place of birth: Leicester, England
- Height: 1.79 m (5 ft 10 in)
- Position: Winger

Team information
- Current team: Rugby Borough

Youth career
- Aston Villa
- Leicester City

Senior career*
Years	Team	Apps	(Gls)
2010–2011	Leicester City	0	(0)
2011	→ Kettering Town (loan)	3	(0)
2011	Muangthong United	0	(0)
2011–2012	→ Suphanburi (loan)	36	(10)
2012–2013	Nonthaburi	28	(6)
2014	Corby Town		
2014	Nuneaton Town	12	(1)
2015	NK Domžale	2	(0)
2017	Harrowby United		
2018	Phnom Penh Crown	4	(1)
2020	Bedworth United	8	(1)
2022	Shepshed Dynamo	8	(1)
2024–2025	Leicester St Andrews		
2025–	Rugby Borough		

International career^{‡}
	England U16	2	(0)
2007	England U17	6	(0)
	England U18	4	(0)
- England U19
2014–	Antigua and Barbuda	9	(0)
- * Club domestic league appearances and goals as of 23:00, 19 November 2020 (UTC) ‡ National team caps and goals as of 23:00, 19 November 2020 (UTC)

Jorrin Nemiah John (born 6 November 1990) is a professional footballer who plays as a winger for Rugby Borough. Born in England, he represented the country internationally at various youth levels before switching to the Antigua and Barbudan national team.

== Club career ==
John came through the youth ranks of Aston Villa and Leicester City. In February 2011, he joined Kettering Town on a month's loan. He was released by Leicester in May 2011.

In August 2011 he signed an 18-month deal with Thai Premier League champions Muangthong United spending the first months with Muangthong's sister club, Suphanburi, who play in Division One.

He then moved on loan to TTM. He then joined Nonthaburi

In March 2014, he returned to England and signed for Corby Town to maintain fitness before in July 2014, moving to Nuneaton Town.

In January 2015, he signed with NK Domžale.

In October 2017, he signed with Harrowby United and made his debut away to Rugby Town in the FA Vase 1st round proper.

In January 2018, he signed with six-times Cambodian League champion Phnom Penh Crown FC.

John signed for Southern League Division One Central side Bedworth United on 19 September 2020.

John signed for Northern Premier League Division One Midlands side Rugby Town on 4 July 2025. He was joined at the club on the same day as defender Joe Magunda.

== International career ==
John represented England at Under 16, Under 17, Under 18 and Under 19 levels. In October 2014 he was called up by Antigua and Barbuda making his full international debut on 8 October in a match against Saint Lucia in the Caribbean Cup. He was also part of the Antiguan team at the 2014 Caribbean Cup.
