= Valeriy Hryshyn =

Ukrainian footballer (born 1994)

Personal information
- Full name: Valeriy Ihorovych Hryshyn
- Date of birth: 12 June 1994 (age 32)
- Place of birth: Lyman, Ukraine
- Height: 1.83 m (6 ft 0 in)
- Position: Forward

Team information
- Current team: Phnom Penh Crown
- Number: 14

Youth career
- 2008–2011: Shakhtar Donetsk

Senior career*
| Years | Team | Apps | (Gls) |
| 2011–2019 | Shakhtar Donetsk | 0 | (0) |
| 2013 | → Illichivets Mariupol (loan) | 0 | (0) |
| 2015 | → Hoverla Uzhhorod (loan) | 10 | (1) |
| 2015 | → Metalist Kharkiv (loan) | 0 | (0) |
| 2016 | → Illichivets Mariupol (loan) | 3 | (0) |
| 2016 | → Avanhard Kramatorsk (loan) | 11 | (1) |
| 2018 | → Club Valencia (loan) | | |
| 2019 | Sheikh Russel KC | 11 | (3) |
| 2021–2023 | Phnom Penh Crown | 31 | (7) |
| 2023–2025 | Fortis | 35 | (8) |
| 2024 | → Bashundhara Kings (loan) | 0 | (0) |
| 2025 | Madura United | 6 | (0) |
| 2026– | Phnom Penh Crown | 5 | (1) |

International career^{‡}
| 2010–2011 | Ukraine U17 | 3 | (0) |
| 2011–2012 | Ukraine U18 | 12 | (3) |
| 2012–2013 | Ukraine U19 | 9 | (2) |
- * Club domestic league appearances and goals as of 9 November 2026 ‡ National team caps and goals as of 24 May 2013

Valeriy Ihorovych Hryshyn (Ukrainian: Валерій Ігорович Гришин; born 12 June 1994) is a Ukrainian professional footballer who plays as a forward for Phnom Penh Crown.

== Club career ==
Hryshyn is a product of youth team systems of Shakhtar Donetsk. From February 2015 he played on loan for Mariupol.

He made his début in the Ukrainian Premier League for Hoverla Uzhhorod in the game against Metalurh Zaporizhya on 1 March 2015.

in 2019, he signed for Sheikh Russel KC in the Bangladesh Premier League and played there before moving to Cambodian side Phnom Penh Crown.

== Honours ==
Phnom Penh Crown

- Cambodian Premier League: 2021, 2022
- Cambodian Super Cup: 2022
- Cambodian League Cup: 2022, 2023
