= Makerlo Tellez =

Bolivian footballer

Personal information
- Full name: Markerlo Tellez Menendez
- Date of birth: 22 October 2002 (age 24)
- Place of birth: Bolivia
- Height: 1.70 m (5 ft 7 in)
- Position: Winger

Youth career
- CD Los Almendros

Senior career*
Years	Team	Apps	(Gls)
2023	Libertad Gran Mamoré	17	(1)
2024–2025	Jorge Wilstermann	28	(1)
2025–2026	Phnom Penh Crown	26	(2)
- * Club domestic league appearances and goals as of 18 May 2026

Markerlo Tellez Menendez (born 22 October 2002) is a Bolivian professional football player who plays as a winger for Phnom Penh Crown in the Cambodian Premier League.

== Career ==
=== Jorge Wilstermann ===
In 2024–2025 season, Makerlo played for Jorge Wilstermann in Bolivian Primera División making 32 appearances and 2 goals.

=== Phnom Penh Crown ===
In July 2025, Makerlo signed for Phnom Penh Crown in the Cambodian Premier League became the first Bolivian football player in the league.
