= Fareed Sadat =

Afghan footballer (born 1998)

Personal information
- Date of birth: 10 November 1998 (age 28)
- Place of birth: Kabul, Afghanistan
- Height: 1.88 m (6 ft 2 in)
- Position: Forward

Team information
- Current team: Kuala Lumpur City

Youth career
- Espoo
- Atlantis
- GrIFK

Senior career*
Years	Team	Apps	(Gls)
2014	GrIFK	2	(0)
2015	Espoo	13	(7)
2016–2017	Lahti Akatemia	13	(7)
2016–2018	Lahti	39	(3)
2018	→ PKKU (loan)	4	(1)
2019	Haukar	6	(1)
2020	MuSa	11	(4)
2020–2021	AC Oulu	20	(5)
2021	→ OLS	2	(0)
2021	MuSa	8	(4)
2022	Phnom Penh Crown	25	(19)
2023	Nakhon Si United	9	(0)
2023–2024	PSKC Cimahi	13	(2)
2024	Persikabo 1973	12	(6)
2025–2026	Bhayangkara Presisi	22	(4)
2026–	Kuala Lumpur City	0	(0)

International career^{‡}
2017	Finland U19	3	(0)
2019–	Afghanistan	14	(0)
- * Club domestic league appearances and goals as of 24 January 2026 ‡ National team caps and goals as of 14 October 2025

Fareed Sadat (Dari: فرید سادات; born 10 November 1998) is an Afghan professional footballer who plays as a forward for Malaysia Super League club Kuala Lumpur City and the Afghanistan national team.

Born in Afghanistan, Sadat represented Finland at youth international level before switching to represent Afghanistan at senior level.

== Early and personal life ==
Born in Kabul, Afghanistan, Sadat arrived in Finland in 2011, to join his father who had moved there previously. In October 2016 he stated that he was intending to apply for Finnish citizenship when he turned 18. He has acquired Finnish citizenship.

== Club career ==
Sadat played youth football for Espoo, Atlantis, and GrIFK.

Sadat has played senior football for GrIFK, Espoo, Lahti, Lahti Akatemia, Haukar, MuSa, AC Oulu, and OLS.

In October 2016, Sadat signed a new two-year contract with Lahti.

In August 2021, he joined the Finnish second-tier side MuSa.

He signed for Cambodian club Phnom Penh Crown for the 2022 season. He scored twice on his debut against Visakha in a 2–1 win, helping his team lift the first ever Cambodian Super Cup. In the 2022 season he scored 19 goals in 25 league games.

He signed for Thai club Nakhon Si United for the 2023 season.

In September 2023, Sadat joined PSKC Cimahi club in the Indonesian Liga 2. He then signed for Persikabo 1973. He signed for Bhayangkara for 2025.

In September 2026, he moved to Malaysia Super League club Kuala Lumpur City after their transfer ban elapsed.

== International career ==
Sadat has represented Finland at under-19 international level. Sadat made his debut with the Afghanistan national football team in a 2–0 friendly loss to Turkmenistan on 25 December 2019.

== Career statistics ==
As of 5 January 2026

Appearances and goals by club, season and competition
Club	Season	League			National cup		Other		Continental		Total	
Club	Season	Division	Apps	Goals	Apps	Goals	Apps	Goals	Apps	Goals	Apps	Goals
Grankulla IFK	2014	Kakkonen	2	0	—		—		—		2	0
FC Espoo	2015	Kolmonen	13	7	2	1	—		—		15	8
Lahti Akatemia	2016	Kakkonen	4	2	—		—		—		4	2
Lahti Akatemia	2017	Kakkonen	9	5	—		—		—		9	5
Lahti Akatemia	Total		13	7	0	0	0	0	0	0	13	7
Lahti	2016	Veikkausliiga	15	1	3	1	4 (Note: Includes Finnish League Cup)	0	—		22	2
Lahti	2017	Veikkausliiga	15	2	4	1	–		–		19	3
Lahti	2018	Veikkausliiga	9	0	0	0	–		1 (Note: Includes UEFA Europa League)	0	10	0
Lahti	Total		39	3	7	2	4	0	1	0	51	5
PKKU (loan)	2018	Kakkonen	4	1	–		–		–		4	1
Haukar	2019	1. deild karla	6	1	0	0	1	3	–		7	4
MuSa	2020	Ykkönen	11	4	–		–		–		11	4
AC Oulu	2020	Ykkönen	10	5	2	0	–		–		12	5
AC Oulu	2021	Veikkausliiga	10	0	0	0	–		–		10	0
AC Oulu	Total		20	5	2	0	0	0	0	0	22	5
OLS	2021	Kakkonen	2	0	—		—		—		2	0
MuSa	2021	Ykkönen	8	4	–		–		–		8	4
Phnom Penh Crown	2022	Cambodian Premier League	25	19	0	0	1 (Note: Includes Cambodian Super Cup)	2	1 (Note: Includes AFC Cup)	1	27	22
Nakhon Si United	2022–23	Thai League 2	8	0	–		–		–		8	0
PSKC Cimahi	2023–24	Indonesian Liga 2	13	2	–		–		–		13	2
Persikabo 1973	2024–25	Indonesian Liga 2	12	6	–		–		–		12	6
Bhayangkara	2024–25	Indonesian Liga 2	9	1	–		–		–		9	1
Bhayangkara	2025–26	Super League	11	3	–		–		–		11	3
Bhayangkara	Total		20	4	0	0	0	0	0	0	20	4
Career total			196	63	11	3	6	5	2	1	215	72
