= Samrith Seiha =

Cambodian footballer

Samrith Seiha សំរិត សីហា
Personal information
- Full name: Samrith Seiha
- Date of birth: May 22, 1990 (age 36)
- Place of birth: Cambodia
- Height: 1.72 m (5 ft 7 1/2 in)
- Position: Goalkeeper

Senior career*
Years	Team	Apps	(Gls)
2008–2011	National Defense Ministry		
2012–2013	Phnom Penh Crown		
2014–2015	Nagaworld		
2016	Cambodia Tiger	7	(0)
2017–2022	Nagaworld		

International career
2007–2013	Cambodia	11	(0)
- * Club domestic league appearances and goals

Samrith Seiha (born 22 April 1990) is a former Cambodian footballer and goalkeeper for the Cambodia national football team and the club team Nagaworld. Seiha made his debut in 2007 at the age of just 17.
