= Boris Kok =

Cambodian footballer (born 1991)

Personal information
- Full name: Boris Kok
- Date of birth: 20 May 1991 (age 35)
- Place of birth: Nancy, France
- Height: 1.74 m (5 ft 9 in)
- Positions: Centre back; defensive midfielder

Team information
- Current team: FC Wambrechies

Youth career
- GSA Tomblaine
- AS Nancy Lorraine

Senior career*
Years	Team	Apps	(Gls)
2007–2008	Jarville JF		
2008–2009	US Vandœuvre-lès-Nancy		
2009–2010	FC Toul		
2010–2012	Nancy Olympique		
2012–2017	Phnom Penh Crown	113	(3)
2018–2019	GSA Tomblaine		
2020–2022	Phnom Penh Crown	24	(1)
2022	→ Sarawak United (loan)	13	(4)
2024–	FC Wambrechies		

International career^{‡}
2015–2023	Cambodia	9	(0)
- * Club domestic league appearances and goals ‡ National team caps and goals as of 2 January 2023

Boris Kok (born 20 May 1991) is a professional footballer who plays as a centre back or a defensive midfielder for French club FC Wambrechies. Born in France, he represents the Cambodia national team.

== Personal life ==
Though born in Nancy, Kok's parents hail from Kampong Cham and Battambang.

== Club career ==
Kok began playing youth football with Tomblaine before continuing his youth development at AS Nancy Lorraine, Jarville JF, US Vandoeuvre, FC Toul and Nancy Olympic. Whilst at high school, his team won the French championships and they went on to represent France in the Schools World Cup in Chile. In 2012, he signed a professional contract with Phnom Penh Crown. In 2017, he became the first defender to score a hat-trick in the Cambodian League, after netting three times against EDCFC. He is currently serving as vice-captain of the club behind Orn Chanpolin. In 2022, he joined Malaysian Super League side Sarawak United on a season-long loan.

== International career ==
Kok made his international debut in a friendly match against Bhutan on 20 August 2015.

== Honours ==
Phnom Penh Crown

- Cambodian League: 2014, 2015, 2021
