= Phach Socheavila =

Cambodian footballer

Phach Socheavila ផាច សុជាវីឡា
Personal information
- Full name: Phach Socheavila
- Date of birth: 19 November 2000 (age 25)
- Place of birth: Phnom Penh, Cambodia
- Height: 1.64 m (5 ft 5 in)
- Position: Left back

Team information
- Current team: MOI Kompong Dewa
- Number: 39

Youth career
- Preah Khan Reach
- 2014–2018: Bati Academy

Senior career*
Years	Team	Apps	(Gls)
2018–2023	Electricite du Cambodge		
2023–	Phnom Penh Crown	42	(1)
2025–	→ MOI Kompong Dewa (loan)	3	(0)

International career^{‡}
2016	Cambodia U-16		
2023–	Cambodia	4	(0)
- * Club domestic league appearances and goals as of 9 November 2026 ‡ National team caps and goals as of 12:04, 04 October 2023 (UTC)

Phach Socheavila (Khmer: ផាច សុជាវីឡា; born 19 November 2000) is a Cambodian professional footballer who plays as a left back for Cambodian Premier League club MOI Kompong Dewa on loan from Phnom Penh Crown and the Cambodia national team

== Career statistics ==
=== International ===
As of matches played 24 May 2024.

National team	Year	Apps	Goals
Cambodia	2023	2	0
Cambodia	2024	1	0
Total		3	0

== Honours ==
=== Club ===
Phnom Penh Crown

- Hun Sen Cup: 2024–25
- Cambodian Super Cup: 2023
- Cambodian League Cup: 2023
