= Eam Ratana =

Cambodian footballer

Personal information
- Full name: Eam Ratana
- Date of birth: 12 March 2003 (age 23)
- Place of birth: Cambodia
- Height: 1.71 m (5 ft 7 in)
- Position: Left-back

Team information
- Current team: Phnom Penh Crown
- Number: 32

Senior career*
Years	Team	Apps	(Gls)
2019–2023	Soltilo Angkor		
2023–2025	ISI Dangkor Senchey	42	(2)
2025–	Phnom Penh Crown	35	(1)

International career^{‡}
2022	Cambodia U20	3	(0)
2023	Cambodia U23	2	(0)
- * Club domestic league appearances and goals as of 9 November 2026 (UTC) ‡ National team caps and goals as of 8 September 2026

Eam Ratana (born 12 March 2003) is a Cambodian professional footballer who plays as a Left-back for Phnom Penh Crown.

== Career ==
Ratana started his career with Soltilo Angkor in 2019.

Ratana join ISI Dangkor Senchey in 2023.

On 13 February 2025, Ratana joined Phnom Penh Crown.

== International career ==
Ratana was called up for Cambodia U20 in 2022 to compete in 2023 AFC U-20 Asian Cup qualification. where he played all matches for his country.

Ratana was called up for Cambodia U23 in 2023 to compete in 2023 AFF U-23 Championship where he made two appearances for his country.

== Honours ==
Phnom Penh Crown

- Hun Sen Cup: 2024–25
