= Oleh Starynskyi =

Ukrainian football manager

Personal information
- Full name: Oleh Mykhaylovych Starynskyi
- Date of birth: 28 November 1985 (age 40)
- Place of birth: Bila Tserkva, Ukraine

Team information
- Current team: Phnom Penh Crown (Head Coach)

Managerial career
- Years: Team
- 2015–2016: Malaysia U17 (assistant)
- 2016: Cambodia U19 (assistant)
- 2016: Phnom Penh Crown U19
- 2016–2017: Phnom Penh Crown
- 2019: Speranța Nisporeni (assistant)
- 2019–2020: Shakhtar Donetsk U19 (analyst)
- 2020–: Phnom Penh Crown

Oleh Mykhaylovych Starynskyi (Ukrainian: Олег Михайлович Старинський; born 28 November 1985) is a Ukrainian professional football manager who is currently the head coach of Cambodian Premier League side Phnom Penh Crown.

== Managerial career ==
Prior to re-joining Phnom Penh Crown, Starynskyi was head of the Analysis Department at Shakhtar Donetsk's academy in Ukraine. Starynskyi also worked with the Phnom Penh Crown U-19 in 2016 and was an assistant coach of the Cambodia national under-19 football team that same year. He also had stints coaching teams in Moldova and Malaysia.

On 19 November 2020, Starynskyi return to Phnom Penh Crown for his second stint where he then guided them to back-to-back league titles in the 2021 and 2022 season. He also guided the club to win 2 Cambodian League Cup, 2 Cambodian Super Cup and in 2025, the Hun Sen Cup. Starynskyi also managed to won 'Coach of the Season' award in 2021 and 2022 respectively.

== Managerial statistics ==
As of match played 17 May 2026

Managerial record by team and tenure
Team	Nat.	From	To	Record								Ref.
Team	Nat.	From	To	G	W	D	L	GF	GA	GD	Win %	Ref.
Phnom Penh Crown	(Cambodia)	18 November 2020	Present	143	88	25	30	337	186	+151	61.54	
Career Total				143	88	25	30	337	186	+151	61.54	

== Honours ==
=== Club ===
==== Phnom Penh Crown ====
- Cambodian Premier League: 2021, 2022
- Cambodian League Cup: 2022, 2023
- Cambodian Super Cup: 2022, 2023
- Hun Sen Cup: 2025

=== Individual ===
- 2021 Cambodian League 'Coach of the Season'
- 2022 Cambodian League 'Coach of the Season'
