= Jozsef Keaveny =

Irish footballer

Personal information
- Full name: Jozsef Phelim Keaveny
- Date of birth: 12 October 1999 (age 27)
- Place of birth: Leicester, England
- Position: Forward

Youth career
- 2009–2019: Leicester City

Senior career*
Years	Team	Apps	(Gls)
2019–2020	AEK Larnaca	9	(1)
2021	Anstey Nomads	17	(7)
2022	Angkor Tiger	18	(6)

International career
2016	Republic of Ireland U17		
- * Club domestic league appearances and goals as of 14:26, 11 January 2022 (UTC)

Jozsef Phelim Keaveny (born 12 October 1999) is a former professional footballer who played as a forward for Cambodian Premier League club Angkor Tiger. Born in England, he represented Ireland at youth level.

== Club career ==
Keaveny played for his local club Leicester City for 10 years in their youth teams. He was released by Leicester in June 2019 and signed for AEK Larnaca of the Cypriot First Division on 9 July 2019. He made his debut in senior football on 8 November 2019, coming off the bench in the 84th minute in a game against Doxa Katokopias and scoring the winner in the 95th minute in a 2–1 win for his side. At the end of 2020, he returned to Leicester City as a mentor after being forced to retire from professional football due to injury. In August 2021, he was playing part-time for United Counties League side Anstey Nomads. On 20 January 2022, Keaveny returned to professional football to join the Cambodian Premier League side Angkor Tiger.

== International career ==
Keaveny was called up to the Republic of Ireland U17 squad in 2016 for 2 games against Switzerland U17. He is eligible to play for Republic of Ireland as 3 of his grandparents are from there. He is also eligible to play for Hungary through his maternal grandfather from Budapest and England as it is his country of birth.

== Personal life ==
Keaveny grew up a Celtic and Republic of Ireland fan; he idolised Roy Keane, a former player of both teams.

== Career statistics ==
=== Club ===
As of 19 February 2020

Club	Season	League			Cup		Continental		Other		Total	
Club	Season	Division	Apps	Goals	Apps	Goals	Apps	Goals	Apps	Goals	Apps	Goals
AEK Larnaca	2019–20	Cypriot First Division	9	1	1 (Note: Appearances in the Cypriot Cup)	0	0	0	0	0	10	1
Career total			9	1	1	0	0	0	0	0	10	1
