= Antoine Lemarié =

French association football player (born February 1996)

Personal information
- Date of birth: 9 February 1996 (age 30)
- Place of birth: Thiais, France
- Height: 1.75 m (5 ft 9 in)
- Position: Winger

Team information
- Current team: CE Casa de Portugal
- Number: 96

Senior career*
Years	Team	Apps	(Gls)
2019	Forrestfield United	10	(1)
2019–2020	Farsley Celtic	0	(0)
2020	Espoo	16	(1)
2021	JJK Jyväskylä	1	(0)
2021	→ Vaajakoski (loan)	14	(3)
2022–2023	Vaajakoski	21	(4)
2023	RoPS	23	(6)
2023–2024	Boeung Ket Angkor	6	(0)
2025-2026	KuPS II	20	(2)
2026	SC Escaldes	14	(8)
2026-	CE Casa de Portugal	1	(0)
- * Club domestic league appearances and goals as of 14 September 2024

Antoine Lemarié (born 9 February 1996) is a French professional footballer who plays as a winger for Primera Divisió club CE Casa de Portugal.

== Career ==
Lemarié had spent several years playing for Finnish low tier teams such as Espoo, JKK, Vaajakoski and RoPS.

In January 2023, Lemarié signed for Greek club Paniliakos. He left the club after playing one match. It was reported that the team owed him the promised salary and he was menaced by the team's president after reminding him about the issue.

In December, Lemarié joined Cambodian club Boeung Ket, signing his first professional contract in a 6 month deal. He made his professional debut on 12 December 2023 in his team's 0–2 defeat against Visakha.

Lemarié returned to Finland to play for KuPS Akatemia, the academy team of Veikkausliiga team KuPS, for the 2025 season in the Ykkönen, or Finnish third division.
