= Long Phearath =

Cambodian footballer (born 1998)

Personal information
- Full name: Long Phearath
- Date of birth: 7 January 1998 (age 28)
- Place of birth: Sihanouk Ville, Cambodia
- Height: 1.68 m (5 ft 6 in)
- Position: Attacking midfielder

Team information
- Current team: Phnom Penh Crown
- Number: 16

Youth career
- 2009–2016: Phnom Penh Crown

Senior career*
Years	Team	Apps	(Gls)
2016–2018	Western Phnom Penh		
2018–2019	Soltilo Angkor		
2019–2022	Angkor Tiger		
2022–2023	Preah Khan Reach Svay Rieng	17	(3)
2023–	Phnom Penh Crown	66	(2)

International career
2016	Cambodia U19	2	(2)
2022–	Cambodia	3	(0)
- * Club domestic league appearances and goals as of 26 October 2026

Long Phearath (born 7 January 1998) is a Cambodian professional footballer who plays as an attacking midfielder for Cambodian Premier League club Phnom Penh Crown and the Cambodia national team.

== Club ==
Phnom Penh Crown

- Hun Sen Cup: 2024–25
- Cambodian League Cup: 2023
- Cambodian Super Cup: 2023
