= Orn Chanpolin =

Cambodian footballer

Orn Chanpolin អ៊ន ចាន់ប៉ូលីន
Personal information
- Full name: Orn Chanpolin
- Date of birth: 15 March 1998 (age 28)
- Place of birth: Phnom Penh, Cambodia
- Height: 1.74 m (5 ft 9 in)
- Position: Defensive midfielder

Team information
- Current team: Phnom Penh Crown
- Number: 8

Youth career
- 2011–2015: Phnom Penh Crown

Senior career*
Years	Team	Apps	(Gls)
2015–	Phnom Penh Crown		

International career^{‡}
2016	Cambodia U19	1	(0)
2017	Cambodia U21	3	(0)
2019	Cambodia U23	13	(0)
2017–	Cambodia	36	(1)
- * Club domestic league appearances and goals as of 20:12, 21 January 2019 (UTC) ‡ National team caps and goals as of 2 January 2023

Orn Chanpolin (Khmer: អ៊ន ចាន់ប៉ូលីន, born 15 March 1998) is a Cambodian professional footballer who plays as a defensive midfielder for Cambodian Premier League club Phnom Penh Crown, which he captains, and the Cambodia national team.

== Club career ==
Orn Chanpolin made his senior debut in Cambodia League in 2018 For Phnom Penh Crown.

== International career ==
Orn Chanpolin made his international debut during the 2020 AFC U-23 Championship qualification phase against Australia on 22 March 2019.

Chanpolin scored his first senior international goal on 20 December 2022 against the Philippines at the Morodok Techo National Stadium during the 2022 AFF Championship, which ended in a 3–2 victory.

As of matches played 29 December 2022.

National team	Year	Apps	Goals
Cambodia	2017	2	0
Cambodia	2018	3	0
Cambodia	2019	9	0
Cambodia	2021	7	0
Cambodia	2022	9	1
Total		30	1

== International goals ==
No.	Date	Venue	Opponent	Score	Result	Competition
1.	20 December 2022	Morodok Techo National Stadium, Phnom Penh, Cambodia	Philippines	2–0	3–2	2022 AFF Championship

== Honours ==
Phnom Penh Crown

- Cambodian Premier League: 2015, 2021, 2022
- Cambodian Super Cup: 2022
- Cambodian League Cup: 2022, 2023
