= Oriol Mohedano =

Spanish football manager

Personal information
- Full name: Oriol Mohedano Segura
- Date of birth: 8 July 1986 (age 40)
- Place of birth: Creixell, Spain

Managerial career
- Years: Team
- 2014–2015: Servette U18 (assistant)
- 2015: Legirus Inter (assistant)
- 2016: Phnom Penh Crown (interim)
- 2016: SJK II
- 2017: SJK (assistant)
- 2017–2021: Cambodian Tiger
- 2022: Preah Khan Reach Svay Rieng (assistant)
- 2023: Raufoss (assistant)
- 2023: Siem Reap United (technical director)
- 2023: Jhapa
- 2024: United City
- 2024: Manila Digger
- 2025: Paro FC
- 2025: Nakhon Si United
- 2026: Siem Reap

Oriol Mohedano Segura is a Spanish football manager/head coach.

== Managerial statistics ==
As of match played 25 October 2025

Managerial record by team and tenure
Team	Nat	From	To	Record							
Team	Nat	From	To	G	W	D	L	GF	GA	GD	Win %
Cambodian Tiger	(Cambodia)	18 April 2017	30 November 2021	6	1	2	3	8	13	−5	16.67
Jhapa	(Nepal)	5 October 2023	31 December 2023	8	2	4	2	4	4	+0	25.00
Manila Digger	(Philippines)	1 September 2024	6 November 2024	3	2	0	1	6	3	+3	66.67
Paro FC	(Bhutan)	1 February 2025	26 August 2025	12	12	0	0	34	7	+27	100.00
Nakhon Si United	(Thailand)	11 September 2025	29 October 2025	7	1	1	5	9	22	−13	14.29
Total				36	18	7	11	61	49	+12	50.00
