= Phnom Penh Crown FC =

Cambodian association football club

Phnom Penh Crown ភ្នំពេញក្រោន
- Full name: Phnom Penh Crown Football Club
- Nickname: Red Singha
- Short name: PPC
- Founded: 2001; 25 years ago as Smart United; 2009; 17 years ago as Phnom Penh Crown
- Ground: RSN Stadium
- Capacity: 5010
- President: Phu Cherlin
- Head coach: Oleh Starynskyi
- League: Cambodian Premier League
- 2025–26: Cambodian Premier League, 2nd of 11
| Home colours | Away colours | Third colours |

Phnom Penh Crown Football Club (Khmer: ក្លឹបបាល់ទាត់ភ្នំពេញក្រោន), commonly referred to as Crown or PPC, is a Cambodian professional football club based in Sangkat Toul Sangke II, Khan Russey Keo, Phnom Penh. The club competes in the Cambodian Premier League, the top flight of Cambodian football.

Nicknamed the "Red Singha", the club was first formed as Smart United Football Club in 2001. Phnom Penh Crown is one of the most successful and prominent teams in Cambodia, having won a recorded 8 league titles, the most of any team in Cambodian football. Alongside league success, Phnom Penh Crown also continued to win domestic cups, winning the Hun Sen Cup on 3 occasions, Cambodian League Cup and the Cambodian Super Cup each twice.

== History ==
=== Early years and establishment (2001–2005) ===
The club was first established in 2001 as Smart United with the support of Smart Mobile Cambodia. Smart United then joined the Cambodian League, which at the time was a semi-professional league. Smart United made their mark in their second season, winning the Cambodian League title in 2002, and their subsequent participation was not successful until 2005 when they switched sponsors.

In collaboration with Hello Mobitel, the new club was renamed Hello United. However, the change of name and identity did not bring much success on the field, with their team finishing runners-up in the Cambodian League. Khemara Keila. At the same time, the club's top scorer award went to Hok Sochivorn with 22 goals.

=== The rise of Phnom Penh (2006–2009) ===
In 2006, Hello Mobitel sold the club to another businessman, Rithy Samnang, who changed the club name to Phnom Penh United. The president of this club aims to represent Phnom Penh and to prepare for the league title. At the beginning of the 2006 season, the club participated in the AFC President's Cup for the first time but did not qualify for the regional qualifiers.

One year after the change of membership and the addition of new members, the merger of Phnom Penh United Football Club and Empire to prepare for the new competition, the addition of the Hun Sen Cup, a merger of two clubs, Phnom Penh United changed its name to Phnom Penh Empire in 2007. The club's full-year development period, in the 2008 season, proved to be the most successful club ever, winning two trophies: the Metfone Cambodian League (MCL) and the Hun Sen Cup, the first trophy in the club's history.

=== Domestic dominance (2010–2015) ===
In 2009, Phnom Penh Empire has modernized its club name to Phnom Penh Crown after they acquired a new sponsor, Crown Casino, the name change also focused on attracting young people. King of the Phnom Penh Regional Club as well. In 2009, Phnom Penh Crown finished 4th in the MCL, but they were still able to win the Hun Sen Cup with a goal scored by Keo Sok Ngor. On the team on Naga Corp in the final result 1–0 as well. After the domestic meeting, Phnom Penh Crown had two major matches: the AFC President's Cup and the Singapore Cup. Two defeats and a win over Bhutan's Yeedzin were not enough to advance to the second round of the AFC Championship President's Cup. A 2–0 win over the Young Lions in the Singapore Cup saw them reach the quarter-finals before Thailand's Bangkok Glass defeated the club in the second leg. In 2010, Phnom Penh Crown won the MCL title for the third time, beating PKR 4–3 in the play-off finals, despite finishing fourth in the domestic campaign. They also lost to the Ministry of National Defense 3–2 in the final of the Hun Sen Cup.

==== 2013–14 season ====
Phnom Penh Crown finished third after losing on penalties to the Ministry of National Defense in the semi-finals of the Hun Sen Cup and in the league of Metfone Cambodian League. They finished the regular season in third place, losing to Svay Rieng in the semi-finals, losing 4–3 to the final champions. The 2014 season began with Phnom Penh Crown knocked out of the Hun Sen Cup semi-finals under Build Bright United. However, Phnom Penh Crown won the MCL for the first time. 5 With a 1–0 win over Naga Corp, goalkeeper Suyati was awarded the Golden Glove, the league's best goalkeeper award.

=== Rebuilding period (2016–2019) ===
Following its league titles in 2014 and 2015, Phnom Penh Crown experienced a period without another league championship. The club continued to compete in the Cambodian League but faced increased competition from teams including Boeung Ket, Nagaworld and Preah Khan Reach Svay Rieng. Despite not winning the league during this period, it remained a regular contender in domestic competitions.

=== Oleh Starynskyi reigns (2020–present) ===
On 18 November 2020, Oleh Starynskyi returned to Phnom Penh Crown as head coach, beginning his second spell in charge of the club. Under Starynskyi helms, Phnom Penh Crown continued to compete for domestic honours. Phnom Penh Crown won the Cambodian League titles in 2021 and 2022, returning to the top of Cambodian football. The club also won the Cambodian League Cup and Cambodian Super Cup in 2022, followed by another League Cup title in 2023. In the 2023–24 AFC Cup, Phnom Penh Crown advanced to the ASEAN zonal semi-finals after finishing second in Group F, but were eliminated by Australia's Central Coast Mariners after getting hammered 4–0.

Phnom Penh Crown finished as runners-up in the 2023–24 and 2024–25 Cambodian Premier League seasons. However, the club secured domestic silverware by winning the 2025 Hun Sen Cup, defeating Preah Khan Reach Svay Rieng 2–1 in the final.

Phnom Penh Crown qualified for the 2025–26 AFC Challenge League after defeating Bruneian club Kasuka 6–0 in the preliminary stage. The club advanced to the quarter-finals after finishing second in Group E, where it faced fellow Cambodian side Preah Khan Reach Svay Rieng. Phnom Penh Crown was eliminated following 4–1 and 2–1 defeats in the two legs, losing 6–2 on aggregate.

In the 2026–27 season, Phnom Penh Crown qualified for the 2026–27 AFC Champions League Two. On 17 September 2026, the club opened its group-stage campaign with a 2–1 victory over Malaysian club Kuching City. The result gave Phnom Penh Crown an encouraging start to its continental campaign as it sought to progress beyond the group stage.

== Team image ==
=== Name history ===
- 2001–2004: Smart United
- 2005: Hello United
- 2006: Phnom Penh United
- 2007–2008: Phnom Penh Empire
- 2009–present: Phnom Penh Crown

== Stadium ==
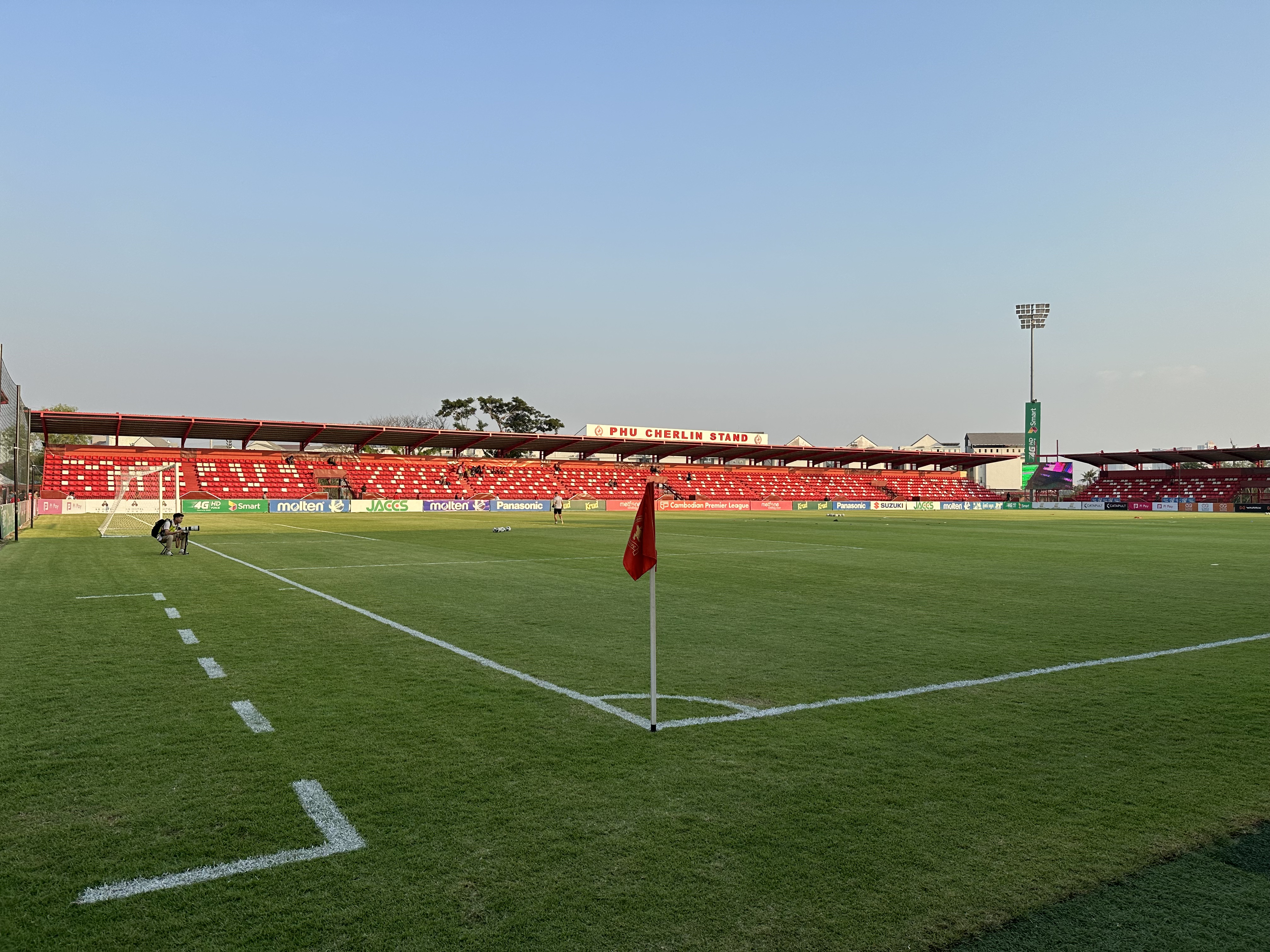
RSN Stadium

Since 2015, Phnom Penh Crown have played their home matches at RSN Stadium, also known as Smart RSN Stadium for sponsorship purposes. Located in Phnom Penh, the stadium was constructed in 2014 and opened in June 2015. It has an all-seater capacity of approximately 5,000 spectators and is operated by Phnom Penh Crown. The stadium was developed under the direction of club owner Rithy Samnang, with the name RSN derived from his initials. It serves as the club's home ground for domestic league and cup matches, as well as selected continental fixtures.

== Kit manufacturers and shirt sponsors ==
| Period | Kit manufacturer | Shirt sponsor |
|---|---|---|
| 2001–2004 | (Italy) Kappa | (Cambodia) Smart Mobile |
| 2005 | (Italy) Kappa | (Cambodia) Hello Mobitel |
| 2006–2010 | (Italy) Kappa | (Cambodia) 855Crown.com |
| 2011–2012 | (Italy) Kappa | (Cambodia) Crown; Hotel & Resort |
| 2013 | (Cambodia) Crown Casino | (Cambodia) 855Play |
| 2014 | (Thailand) FBT | (Cambodia) 855Crown; Hotel & Resort |
| 2015–2018 | (Thailand) FBT | (Cambodia) Smart |
| 2019 | (Thailand) FBT | (Cambodia) Smart; Xihu Resort Hotel |
| 2020–2022 | (Thailand) FBT | (Cambodia) Smart Axiata |
| 2023–2025 | (Thailand) Warrix | (Cambodia) Smart Axiata |
| 2025–present | (Cambodia) Fan Sport | (Cambodia) Smart Axiata |

== Players ==
=== Current squad ===
As of 13 October 2026

Note: Flags indicate national team as defined under FIFA eligibility rules; some limited exceptions apply. Players may hold more than one non-FIFA nationality.

| No. | Pos. | Nation | Player |
|---|---|---|---|
| 1 | GK | CAM | Chiem Samnang |
| 2 | DF | JPN | Riku Matsuda |
| 4 | DF | NED | Rick Ketting (Vice-Captain) |
| 5 | DF | ROU | Raul Feher |
| 6 | DF | CAM | Chhin Vennin |
| 7 | FW | NED | Guytho Mijland |
| 8 | MF | CAM | Orn Chanpolin (Captain) |
| 9 | FW | CAM | Sa Ty |
| 10 | FW | NZL | Moses Dyer |
| 11 | FW | CAM | Yem Devit |
| 14 | MF | UKR | Valeriy Hryshyn |
| 15 | DF | CAM | Choun Chanchav |
| 16 | MF | CAM | Long Phearath (3rd-Captain) |
| 18 | FW | CAM | Brak Thiva |
| 19 | MF | CAM | Sorm Borith |
| 20 | MF | CAM | Koeut Pich |

| No. | Pos. | Nation | Player |
|---|---|---|---|
| 21 | GK | CAM | Tin Razak |
| 22 | GK | CAM | Um Vichet |
| 23 | MF | CAM | Bong Samuel |
| 24 | FW | ITA | Amir Luca Tropeano |
| 25 | MF | CAM | Hort Kimlong |
| 27 | FW | CAM | Sakakibara Rintaro |
| 28 | FW | CZE | Daniel Bares |
| 29 | DF | CAM | Sa Usos |
| 31 | MF | CAM | Chan Houng |
| 32 | DF | CAM | Eam Ratana |
| 33 | GK | CAM | Reth Bunrak |
| 35 | FW | CAM | Bun Chandarareach |
| 39 | DF | CAM | Chhom Pisa |
| 40 | DF | CAM | Zogbe Vireak |
| 44 | MF | CAM | Pov Ponvuthy |
| 45 | MF | AUS | Callum Timmins (on loan from Perth Glory) |

=== Out on loan ===
Note: Flags indicate national team as defined under FIFA eligibility rules; some limited exceptions apply. Players may hold more than one non-FIFA nationality.

| No. | Pos. | Nation | Player |
|---|---|---|---|
| 3 | DF | CAM | Phach Socheavila (at MOI Kompong Dewa) |
| 25 | MF | CAM | Lim Visal (at Kirivong Sok Sen Chey) |
| 27 | FW | CAM | Sot Monyrothanak (at Kirivong Sok Sen Chey) |

== Management and staff ==
As of July 2026

| Position | Staff |
|---|---|
| Team manager | (Cambodia) Keo Sokngon |
| General Manager | (Cambodia) Ly Heang |
| Head coach | (Ukraine) Oleg Starynskyi |
| Assistant coach | (Italy) Leonardo Capristo (Ukraine) Anatoliy Bondarenko |
| Goalkeeper coach | (Egypt) Ahmed Elnady (Cambodia) Kheng Reaksmey |
| Physiotherapist | (Spain) Pedro Cuadrado (Cambodia) Pei Phally |
| Conditioning coach | (France) Arthur Franck |
| Video analyst | (Cambodia) Kim Leabfong (Cambodia) Rim Leap Phea |

== Honours ==
| Type | Honours | Titles | Seasons |
|---|---|---|---|
| League | Cambodian Premier League | 8 | 2002, 2008, 2010, 2011, 2014, 2015, 2021, 2022 |
| Cup | Hun Sen Cup | 3 | 2008, 2009, 2025 |
| Cup | Cambodian League Cup | 2 | 2022, 2023 |
| Cup | Cambodian Super Cup | 2 | 2022, 2023 |

Bold is for those competition that are currently active.

== Award winners ==
=== Domestic ===
- Player of the Season
  - (Cambodia) Andres Nieto (2024–25)
- Top Scorer
  - (Cambodia) Hok Sochivorn (2005)
  - (Cambodia) Andres Nieto (2024–25)
- Coach of the Season
  - (Ukraine) Oleh Starynskyi (2021, 2022)
- Goalkeeper of the Season
  - (Cambodia) Sou Yaty (2014)
  - (Cambodia) Keo Soksela (2015)
  - (Cambodia) Saveng Samnang (2021, 2022)
- Team of the Season
  - (Romania) Raul Feher (2025–26)
  - (Japan) Yusuke Minagawa (2025–26)

== Notable players ==
=== International capped players ===
| AFC/OFC.: (Afghanistan) Fareed Sadat; (Afghanistan) Mustafa Zazai; (Australia) Adriano Pellegrino; (Japan) Riku Matsuda; (Myanmar) Soe Moe Kyaw; (New Zealand) Moses Dyer; (Philippines) Jarvey Gayoso | CAF.: (Lesotho) Sunny Jane; (Zimbabwe) Newton Ben Katanha | UEFA.: (Netherlands) Rick Ketting; (Ukraine) Valeriy Hryshyn | CONMEBOL/ CONCACAF.: (Antigua and Barbuda) Jorrin John; (Brazil) Denilson; (Canada) Diego Gutiérrez |

== Managerial history ==
Coaches by years

| Name | Period | Achievements |
|---|---|---|
| (Thailand) Apisit Im-amphai | 2008–2010 | – 2010 Cambodian League |
| (Croatia) Bojan Hodak | 2011 | |
| (England) Dave Booth | 2011–2012 | – 2011 AFC President's Cup runner-up – 2011 Cambodian League – 2012 AFC President's Cup final round |
| (Switzerland) Sam Schweingruber | 2012–2016 | – 2014 Cambodian League – 2015 Cambodian League |
| (Spain) Oriol Mohedano | 2016 | |
| (Switzerland) Sam Schweingruber (Interim) (2) | 2016 | |
| (Ukraine) Oleh Starynskyi | 2016–2017 | |
| (England) Sean Sainsbury | 2017–2018 | |
| (Brazil) Leonardo Vitorino | 2018–2019 | |
| (Cambodia) Sum Vanna | 2019–2020 | |
| (Ukraine) Oleh Starynskyi (2) | 2020–present | – 2021 C-League – 2022 Cambodian Super Cup – 2022 Cambodian League Cup – 2022 Cambodian Premier League – 2023 Cambodian League Cup – 2023 Cambodian Super Cup – 2024–25 Hun Sen Cup |

== Club captains ==
Captain by years

| Years | Captain |
|---|---|
| 2011 | (Cambodia) Thul Sothearith |
| 2012–2014 | (Cambodia) Kouch Sokumpheak |
| 2015–2016 | (Cambodia) Boris Kok |
| 2017 | (South Africa) Shane Booysen |
| 2018–2019 | (Cambodia) Ouk Sothy |
| 2020–present | (Cambodia) Orn Chanpolin |

== Performance in AFC club competitions ==
=== Continental ===
| Season | Tournament | Round | Club | Home | Away | Aggregate |
|---|---|---|---|---|---|---|
| 2014 | Mekong Club Championship | Semi-finals | (Vietnam) Becamex Bình Dương | 2–5 | | |
| 2014 | Mekong Club Championship | 3rd place play-off | (Laos) Hoang Anh Attapeu | 2–0 | | |
| 2017 | AFC Cup | Play-off round | (Singapore) Home United | 3–4 | 0–3 | 3–7 |
| 2022 | AFC Cup | Group I | (Singapore) Hougang United | 3–4 | | 3rd |
| 2022 | AFC Cup | Group I | (Vietnam) Viettel | 0–1 | | 3rd |
| 2022 | AFC Cup | Group I | (Laos) Young Elephants | 4–2 | | 3rd |
| 2023–24 | AFC Cup | Preliminary round 2 | (Laos) Young Elephants | 3–0 | | |
| 2023–24 | AFC Cup | Play-off round | (Singapore) Tampines Rovers | 3–2 | | |
| 2023–24 | AFC Cup | Group F | (Philippines) Dynamic Herb Cebu | 4–0 | 3–0 | 2nd |
| 2023–24 | AFC Cup | Group F | (Myanmar) Shan United | 4–0 | 1–2 | 2nd |
| 2023–24 | AFC Cup | Group F | (Australia) Macarthur | 3–0 | 0–5 | 2nd |
| 2023–24 | AFC Cup | ASEAN Zonal semi-finals | (Australia) Central Coast Mariners | 0–4 | | |
| 2025–26 | AFC Challenge League | Preliminary stage | (Brunei) Kasuka | 0–6 | | |
| 2025–26 | AFC Challenge League | Group E | (Indonesia) Dewa United | 1–1 | | 2nd |
| 2025–26 | AFC Challenge League | Group E | (Myanmar) Shan United | 3–1 | | 2nd |
| 2025–26 | AFC Challenge League | Group E | (Chinese Taipei) Tainan City | 3–2 | | 2nd |
| 2025–26 | AFC Challenge League | Quarter-finals | (Cambodia) PKR Svay Rieng | 1–4 | 1–2 | 2–6 |
| 2026–27 | AFC Champions League Two | Group H | (Malaysia) Kuching City | 2–1 | | |
| 2026–27 | AFC Champions League Two | Group H | (South Korea) Gangwon FC | | 2–1 | |
| 2026–27 | AFC Champions League Two | Group H | (Hong Kong) Kitchee | 2–0 | 1–2 | |
