= Smart Axiata =

Cambodian telecommunications company

Smart Axiata Company Limited
- Trade name: Smart
- Type: Subsidiary
- Industry: Telecommunications
- Predecessor: Hello Axiata and Smart Mobile
- Founded: 2008; 18 years ago
- Headquarters: Phnom Penh, Cambodia
- Products: Mobile Telephony; Mobile Broadband
- Number of employees: 1,000
- Parent: Axiata Group

Smart Axiata Company Limited, doing business as Smart (formerly known as Smart Mobile) was acquired by Hello Axiata, is Cambodia's telecommunications service provider.

In 2015, Smart launched the Smart Music service, signing original musicians to their streaming platform. Smart is now one of the largest supporters of the new Original Music Movement in Cambodia.
