= Cambodian Super Cup =

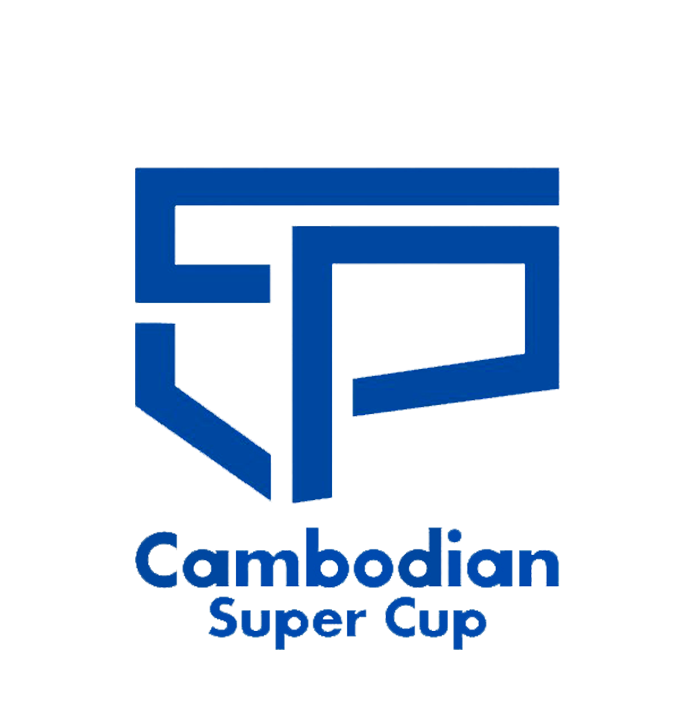
- Organiser(s): Football Federation of Cambodia
- Founded: 2017; 9 years ago
- Region: Cambodia
- Teams: 2
- Current champions: Preah Khan Reach Svay Rieng (3nd title)
- Most championships: Preah Khan Reach Svay Rieng (3 title)
- Broadcaster: BTV Cambodia
- Website: Official website

The Cambodian Super Cup, (previously the CNCC Charity Cup), currently known as Krud Cambodian Super Cup for sponsorship reasons, is a super cup tournament in Cambodia played between the winners of the Cambodian Premier League and the Hun Sen Cup. The first edition was played in 2017. Due to the lack of public interest and financial limitation, the cup was put on hiatus for 4 years from 2018 to 2021. The competition was revived and renamed to the Cambodian Super Cup in 2022, with Phnom Penh Crown as the champion.

Preah Khan Reach Svay Rieng is the latest winner of the competition, securing his third Super Cup title in 2026

== Matches ==
Below is a list of the Super Cup winners. Since its creation, if one team wins the domestic double, then league runners-up are invited as the second team.

Year	Cambodian Premier League champions	Result	Hun Sen Cup winners	Venue
CNCC Charity Cup
2017	Boeung Ket Angkor	3–0	National Defense Ministry	National Stadium
Cambodian Super Cup
2022	Phnom Penh Crown	2–1	Visakha	Old Army Stadium
2023	Phnom Penh Crown	2–1 (a.e.t.)	Visakha	National Stadium
2024	Preah Khan Reach Svay Rieng	2–1	Phnom Penh Crown^{1}	National Stadium
2025	Preah Khan Reach Svay Rieng	2–2 (a.e.t.) (5–3 p)	Phnom Penh Crown	National Stadium
2026	Preah Khan Reach Svay Rieng	2–1	Visakha^{2}	Morodok Techo National Stadium

Notes:

^1 League runners-up.
^2 Cup runners-up.

== Performance by team ==
Team	Winners	Runners-up	Years won	Years runner-up
Preah Khan Reach Svay Rieng	3	–	2024, 2025, 2026	–
Phnom Penh Crown	2	2	2022, 2023	2024, 2025
Boeung Ket	1	–	2017	–
Visakha	–	3	–	2022, 2023, 2026
Tiffy Army	–	1	–	2017

== All-time top goalscorers ==
Bold indicates active players in Cambodian football.

Rank	Player	Club(s)	Goals
1	(Afghanistan) Fareed Sadat	Phnom Penh Crown	2
1	(Cambodia) Khuon Laboravy	Boeung Ket	2
1	(Ghana) **Kwame Peprah**	Preah Khan Reach Svay Rieng	2
1	(Cambodia) **Yudai Ogawa**	Phnom Penh Crown	2
3	(Cambodia) Keo Sokpheng	Visakha	1
3	(Bolivia) **Makerlo Tellez**	Phnom Penh Crown	1
3	(Cambodia) **Min Ratanak**	Preah Khan Reach Svay Rieng	1
3	(Brazil) Pablo Augusto	Preah Khan Reach Svay Rieng	1
3	(Cambodia) **Sa Ty**	Phnom Penh Crown	1
3	(Japan) Tomoki Muramatsu	Boeung Ket	1
3	(Japan) Takumu Nishihara	Visakha	1
