= Cambodian League Cup =

- Organiser(s): Cambodian Premier League
- Founded: 2021; 5 years ago
- Region: Cambodia
- Teams: 14
- Current champions: Phnom Penh Crown (2nd title)
- Most championships: Phnom Penh Crown (2 titles)
- Broadcasters: TV5 Cambodia; AMS Sports; Kampuchea Thmey; Troyorng
- Website: https://cpl-cambodia.com/

The Cambodian League Cup, previously known as CNCC League Cup, is an annual knockout football tournament in Cambodia.

The Cambodian National Competitions Committee (CNCC) planned to hold the 1st edition of the tournament in 2021. However, it was cancelled. The tournament was brought back by the newly established Cambodian Football League Company in 2022, to ensure players from both divisions are active during the 2021 SEA Games period.

== Format ==
Entry is open to all teams that compete in the Cambodian League and the Cambodian League 2. Teams will be drawn into 2 groups, the 1st and 2nd placed from both groups will qualify for the semi-final. The tournament does not use the away goals and goes into overtime and pnalties if necessary.

== Results ==
=== Finals ===
Year	Final		
Year	Champions	Score	Runners-up
2022	Phnom Penh Crown	2–1	Visakha
2023	Phnom Penh Crown	1–1 (a.e.t.) (3–2 pen.)	Nagaworld

=== Results by club ===
Club	Champions	Runners-up	Years won	Years runner-up
Phnom Penh Crown	2	–	2022, 2023	–
Visakha	–	1	–	2022
Nagaworld	–	1	–	2023

== See also ==
- Football in Cambodia
