= 2013 Cambodian League =

Cambodian League
- Season: 2013
- Champions: Svay Rieng
- Top goalscorer: Khoun Laboravy (20 goals)
- Highest scoring: Nagacorp 12-0 Senate Secretariat

2013 Cambodian League is the 29th season of the Cambodian League. A total of 10 teams are competing in the league.

The regular season will be played from January 12 to June 2 and will once again feature playoffs at the end of the season to determine the league champions. The season has been brought forward by 2 months.

== Teams ==
- Boeung Ket Rubber Field
- Build Bright United
- Asia Europe University
- Kirivong Sok Sen Chey
- Nagacorp FC
- National Defense Ministry
- Phnom Penh Crown
- National Police Commissary
- Svay Rieng
- Senate Secretariat

== Personnel and sponsoring ==
Team	Sponsor	Kit maker	Team captain	Head coach
Asia Europe University FC			(Cambodia) Sun Sovanratha	(Cambodia)
Boeung Ket Rubber Field	LS	Kappa	(Cambodia) Keo Sokngon	(Cambodia) Prak Vuthy
Build Bright United			(Cambodia) Sem Bunny	(Cambodia) Lah Salakhan
Kirivong Sok Sen Chey		Kappa	(Cambodia) Nhim Sovannara	(Cambodia) Tep Long Rachana
Nagacorp FC	Naga World	FBT	(Cambodia) Om Thavrak	(Cambodia) Lim Noun
National Defense Ministry	Cambodia Beer	Nike	(Cambodia) Khek Khemrin	(Cambodia) Op Sam Ath
Phnom Penh Crown	CROWN Hotel Resort	Kappa	(Cambodia) Khim Borey	(Switzerland) Sam Schweingruber
National Police Commissary	SOKIMEX	Joma	(Cambodia) Say Piseth	(Cambodia) Ung Kangyanith
Svay Rieng	SHB	Nike	(Cambodia) Tum Saray	(Cambodia) Som Vandeth
Senate Secretariat			(Cambodia)	(Cambodia)

=== Foreign players ===
The number of foreign players is restricted to five per team. A team can use three foreign players on the field in each game.

Club	Player 1	Player 2	Player 3	Player 4	Player 5
Asia Europe					
Boeung Ket	(Nigeria) Bisan George	(Nigeria) Chukwuma Ohuruogo	(Nigeria) Degule Momoh	(Nigeria) Gerard Chinedu	(Cameroon) Befolo Mbarga
Build Bright United	(Nigeria) David Ekele Chukwu	(Nigeria) Daniel Omachoko			
Kirivong	(Nigeria) Nwakuna Friday	(Nigeria) David Njoku	(Nigeria) Ntim Spirit	(Nigeria) Omogiwa Baller	
Nagacorp FC	(Nigeria) Razaqnofi Nofiu	(Nigeria) Kenneth Nwafor	(Nigeria) Ishola Ibrahim	(Cameroon) Ngeng Ernest	(Ivory Coast) Anderson Zogbe
National Defense					
Police Commissary	(Japan) Yasuyuki Yoshida	(Japan) Takahito Ota	(Nigeria) Omoraka Joel	(South Korea) An Jinya	
Phnom Penh Crown	(Nigeria) Odion Obadin	(Netherlands) Elroy van der Hooft	(South Korea) Lee Ha-Neul		
Svay Rieng	(Nigeria) Jame Adekule	(Nigeria) Thomaze Esue	(Japan) Shota Nakagawa		
Senate Secretariat					

== Venues ==
Stadium	Location
Phnom Penh National Olympic Stadium	Phnom Penh

== League table ==
Pos	Team	Pld	W	D	L	GF	GA	GD	Pts	Qualification
1	Boeung Ket Rubber Field (C)	18	12	2	4	54	25	+29	38	Qualification for playoffs
2	Svay Rieng	18	10	3	5	50	27	+23	33	Qualification for playoffs
3	Phnom Penh Crown	18	9	6	3	36	13	+23	33	Qualification for playoffs
4	Build Bright United	18	9	3	6	25	24	+1	30	Qualification for playoffs
5	Nagacorp	18	7	8	3	40	18	+22	29	
6	Kirivong Sok Sen Chey	18	8	4	6	40	29	+11	28	
7	National Police Commissary	18	6	4	8	32	28	+4	22	
8	National Defense Ministry	18	5	6	7	22	31	−9	21	
9	Asia Europe University	18	2	6	10	18	37	−19	12	Relegation Play-off
10	Senate Secretariat	18	0	2	16	10	95	−85	2	Relegation Play-off

Updated to match(es) played on 1 July 2013. Source: FIFA
Rules for classification: 1) points; 2) goal difference; 3) number of goals scored.
(C) Champions

== Playoffs ==
=== Semi-finals ===
2013-07-13
15:00

Svay Rieng	4 - 3	Phnom Penh Crown

RCAF Old Stadium

2013-07-13
15:00

Boeung Ket Rubber Field	1 - 0 (a.e.t.)	Build Bright United

Olympic Stadium

=== 3rd place ===
2013-07-19
15:00

Phnom Penh Crown	1 - 0 (a.e.t.)	Build Bright United

Olympic Stadium

=== Final ===
2013-07-20
15:00

Boeung Ket Rubber Field	0 - 1	Svay Rieng
	Report	Khoun Laboravy 40'

Olympic Stadium

Champions qualify to 2014 AFC President's Cup.

== Promotion-relegation playoff ==
Pos	Team	Pld	W	D	L	GF	GA	GD	Pts
1	TriAsia Phnom Penh	3	3	0	0	10	0	+10	9
2	Asia Europe University	3	2	0	1	4	1	+3	6
3	Takéo Province	3	1	0	2	2	9	−7	3
4	Senate Secretariat	3	0	0	3	0	6	−6	0

== Top scorers ==
Rank	Player	Club	Goals
1	(Cambodia) Khoun Laboravy	Svay Rieng	20
2	(Nigeria) Bisan George	Boeung Ket Rubber Field	18
3	(Nigeria) Nwakuna Friday	Kirivong Sok Sen Chey	16
4	(Netherlands) Elroy van der Hooft	Phnom Penh Crown	12
5	(Cambodia) Chan Vathanaka	Boeung Ket Rubber Field	11

== Awards ==
Awards	Nation/Name	Club
The Golden Boot	(Cambodia) Khoun Laboravy	Svay Rieng
The Player of the season	(Cambodia) Khoun Laboravy	Svay Rieng
Goalkeeper of the season	(Cambodia) Am Sovannarath	Svay Rieng
The Coach of the season	(Cambodia) Sam Vandet	Svay Rieng
