= 2012 Cambodian League =

Cambodian League
- Season: 2012
- Champions: Boeung Ket Rubber Field
- Relegated: Chhlam Samuth, Western University
- AFC President's Cup: Boeung Ket Rubber Field
- Top goalscorer: Nwakuna Friday (20 goals)
- Highest scoring: Chhlam Samuth 1–8 Nagacorp FC, Chhlam Samuth 0–7 Boeung Ket Rubber Field

2012 Cambodian League is the 28th season of the Cambodian League. A total of 10 teams are competing in the league.

The regular season was played from March 3 to August 8, 2012 and featured playoffs at the end of the season to determine the league champions, just like in the 2009 and 2010 campaigns to add more excitement to the league. Boeung Ket Rubber Field was the league champion, defeating regular-season winner Nagacorp in the Final Playoffs match.

== Teams ==
- Boeung Ket Rubber Field
- Build Bright United
- Chhlam Samuth
- Kirivong Sok Sen Chey
- Nagacorp FC
- National Defense Ministry
- Phnom Penh Crown
- National Police Commissary
- Preah Khan Reach (aka Royal Sword)
- Western University

== Personnel and sponsoring ==
Team	Sponsor	Kit maker	Team captain	Head coach
Boeung Ket Rubber Field		Kappa	(Cambodia) Keo Sokngon	(Cambodia) Prak Sovuthy
Build Bright United			(Japan) Dan Ito	(Cambodia) Meas Sam Oeurn
Chhlam Samuth			(Nigeria) Silva Sunday	(Cambodia) Kim Pheakdey
Kirivong Sok Sen Chey		Kappa	(Cambodia) In Vicheka	(Vietnam) Nguyen Chov Hoang
Nagacorp FC	Naga World		(Cambodia) Om Thavrak	(Cambodia) Prak Sovannara
National Defense Ministry		Nike	(Cambodia) Khek Khemrin	(Cambodia) Op Sam Ath
Phnom Penh Crown	CROWN Hotel Resort	Kappa	(Cambodia) Kouch Sokumpheak	(England) David Booth
National Police Commissary	SOKIMEX	Joma	(Cambodia) Say Piseth	(Cambodia) Ung Kangyanith
Preah Khan Reach	SHB	Nike	(Cambodia) Sok Rithy	(Cambodia) Som Vandeth
Western University			(Cambodia)	(Cambodia)

== Venues ==
Stadium	Location
Phnom Penh National Olympic Stadium	Phnom Penh

== League table ==
Pos	Team	Pld	W	D	L	GF	GA	GD	Pts	Qualification or relegation
1	Nagacorp	18	11	5	2	49	21	+28	38	Qualification for playoffs
2	Boeung Ket Rubber Field	18	11	3	4	51	22	+29	36	Qualification for playoffs
3	Preah Khan Reach	18	10	3	5	49	27	+22	33	Qualification for playoffs
4	Police Commissary	18	9	6	3	42	27	+15	33	Qualification for playoffs
5	Phnom Penh Crown	18	8	3	7	39	30	+9	27	
6	Build Bright United	18	8	3	7	24	29	−5	27	
7	National Defense Ministry	18	6	5	7	24	27	−3	23	
8	Kirivong Sok Sen Chey	18	4	5	9	22	28	−6	17	
9	Chhlam Samuth	18	3	2	13	28	74	−46	11	Relegation
10	Western University	18	2	1	15	11	54	−43	7	Relegation

Updated to match(es) played on 19 August 2012. Source:
Rules for classification: 1) points; 2) goal difference; 3) number of goals scored.

== Playoffs ==
=== Semi-finals ===
2012-09-09
14:30

Boeung Ket Rubber Field	4–1 (a.e.t.)	Preah Khan Reach
Julius Oiboh 27'; Momoh Degule Sumaila 98'; Hong Makara 115'; Busayo 119'	Report	David Njoku 20'

Olympic Stadium

2012-09-09
17:00

Naga Corp	0–0 (a.e.t.)	Police Commissary
Penalties
	3–1

Olympic Stadium
2012-09-12
15:30

Preah Khan Reach	4–2	Police Commissary

Olympic Stadium

=== Final ===
2012-09-15
15:30

Naga Corp	1–3	Boeung Ket Rubber Field
Choun Chum 90+'	Report	Keo Sokngon 13', 17'; Julius Oiboh 48'

Olympic Stadium
Referee: Thong Chanketya

Champions qualify to 2013 AFC President's Cup.

== Top scorers ==
Rank	Player	Club	Goals
1	(Nigeria) Nwakuna Friday	Boeung Ket Rubber Field	20
2	(Nigeria) Nelson Oladiji	Police Commissary	19
3	(Cambodia) Choun Chum	Nagacorp	17
4	(Nigeria) Bisan George	Chhlam Samuth	11

== Awards ==
Awards	Nation/Name	Club
The Golden Boot	(Nigeria) Nwakuna Friday	Beoung Ket Rubber Field
The Player of the season	(Cambodia) Keo Sokngon	Beoung Ket Rubber Field
Goalkeeper of the season	(Cambodia) Peng Bunchhay	Boeung Ket Rubber Field
The Coach of the season	(Cambodia) Prak Vuthy	Boeung Ket Rubber Field

Awards	Club
Fair Play	Nagacorp
