= 2010 Cambodian League =

Cambodian League
- Season: 2010
- Champions: Phnom Penh Crown FC
- Top goalscorer: Ononiwu Chukwuma (25 goals)

The 2010 Cambodian League season is the 26th season of top-tier football in Cambodia. A total of ten teams are competing in the league, with Nagacorp the defending champions. The season started in March.

== Teams ==
Post Tel Club and Phuchung Neak were relegated to the second level of Cambodian football, Division 1A after ending the 2009 season in the bottom two places. Promoted from the second level were Chhma Khmao and Prek Pra Keila.

Spark FC were renamed to Wat Phnom.

=== Stadium and locations ===
Locations of teams in the 2010 Cambodian League

Club	Location	Stadium
Phnom Penh Crown	Phnom Penh	Olympic Stadium
Preah Khan Reach		
Khemara Keila	Phnom Penh	Olympic Stadium
Nagacorp		
Kirivong Sok Sen Chey	Takéo	
National Defense Ministry	Phnom Penh	
Build Bright United	Phnom Penh	
Chhma Khmao	Svay Rieng	
Wat Phnom (Formerly Spark FC)	Phnom Penh	
Prek Pra Keila		

== League table ==
Pos	Team	Pld	W	D	L	GF	GA	GD	Pts	Qualification or relegation
1	Nagacorp	18	13	4	1	52	22	+30	43	Qualification for playoffs
2	Build Bright United	18	12	3	3	50	21	+29	39	Qualification for playoffs
3	Preah Khan Reach	18	12	2	4	54	26	+28	38	Qualification for playoffs
4	Phnom Penh Crown	18	10	6	2	56	22	+34	36	Qualification for playoffs
5	Kirivong Sok Sen Chey	18	11	0	7	46	22	+24	33	
6	National Defense Ministry	18	6	4	8	39	28	+11	22	
7	Khemara Keila	18	5	3	10	30	45	−15	18	
8	Prek Pra Keila	18	3	3	12	26	52	−26	12	
9	Wat Phnom	18	3	2	13	28	67	−39	11	Relegation
10	Chhma Khmao	18	1	1	16	18	94	−76	4	Relegation

Updated to match(es) played on August 20, 2010. Source:
Rules for classification: 1) points; 2) goal difference; 3) number of goals scored.

== Playoffs ==
=== Semi-finals ===
2010-08-14

Preah Khan Reach	2 - 1	Build Bright United
Devide Njoku 2'; Nhim Sovannara 41' (o.g.)	Report	Chhun Sothearath 42'

Olympic Stadium, Phnom Penh

2010-08-15

Phnom Penh Crown	4 - 2	Nagacorp
Uche Prince Justine 21'; Sun Sopanha 23', 88'; Sok Pheng 40'	Report	Joseph Oyewole 50'; Sun Sovanrithy 55' (pen.)

Olympic Stadium, Phnom Penh

=== Third place play-off ===
2010-08-20
15:30

Build Bright United	2-2 (a.e.t.)	Nagacorp
Penalties
	5–3

Olympic Stadium, Phnom Penh

=== Final ===
2010-08-21
14:00

Preah Khan Reach	3 - 4	Phnom Penh Crown
Khoun Laboravy 7'; Tum Saray 33'; Sam El Nasa 90+'		Keo Sokngon 17', 88'; Srey Veasna 53'; Hong Makara 81'

Olympic Stadium, Phnom Penh
Attendance: 10,000

Champions qualify to 2011 AFC President's Cup.

== Top scorers ==
Rank	Player	Club	Goals
1	(Nigeria) Julius Chukwuma Ononiwu	Kirivong Sok Sen Chey	25
2	(Cambodia) Teab Vathanak	Nagacorp	21
3	(Cambodia) Khoun Laboravy	Preah Khan Reach	16
3	(Nigeria) Justine Uche Prince	Phnom Penh Crown FC	16
3	(Cambodia) Nuth Sinoun	Build Bright United	16
6	(Cambodia) Keo Sokngon	Phnom Penh Crown FC	12
7	(Cambodia) Sam El Nasa	Preah Khan Reach	10
8	(Cambodia) Phlong Chanthou	Wat Phnom FC	9
8	(Cambodia) Khim Borey	National Defense	9
8	(Nigeria) Oladiji Nelson Olatunde	Build Bright United	9
