= 2020 C-League =

C-League
- Season: 2020
- Dates: 15 February – 25 October
- Champions: Boeung Ket
- Relegated: Bati Academy
- AFC Cup: Boeung Ket; Visakha
- Matches: 108
- Goals: 436 (4.04 per match)
- Top goalscorer: 16 goals Privat Mbarga
- Biggest home win: Visakha 10–1 Asia Euro United (25 July 2020)
- Biggest away win: Bati Academy 0–10 Preah Khan Reach Svay Rieng (4 July 2020)
- Highest scoring: Visakha 10–1 Asia Euro United (25 July 2020)
- Longest winning run: 9 matches Boeung Ket
- Longest unbeaten run: 17 matches Boeung Ket
- Longest winless run: 14 matches Bati Academy
- Longest losing run: 7 matches National Police Commissary; Bati Academy
- Highest attendance: 4,112; Phnom Penh Crown FC 0-0 Preah Khan Reach Svay Rieng (8 March 2020)
- Lowest attendance: 63; Electricite du Cambodge FC 2-0 Bati Academy (29 February 2020)
- All statistics correct as of 2 August 2020.

2020 Metfone C-League was the 36th season of the C-League. Contested by 13 clubs, it operated on a system of promotion and relegation with Cambodian Second League.

== 2020 season clubs ==
=== Teams ===
Locations of the 2020 C-League teams

Team	Location	Stadium	Capacity	Previous season
Angkor Tiger	Siem Reap Province	SRU Stadium	5,000	C-League (5th)
Asia Euro United	Kandal Province	AEU Sport Park	1,500	C-League (8th)
Bati Academy	Takeo Province	Bati Academy Stadium	N/A	C-League (14th)
Boeung Ket	Phnom Penh	Cambodia Airways Stadium	2,500	C-League (4th)
Electricite du Cambodge	Phnom Penh	EDC Stadium	300	C-League (12th)
Kirivong Sok Sen Chey	Takeo Province	Kirivong Sok Sen Chey Stadium	800	C-League (9th)
Nagaworld	Phnom Penh	EDC Stadium	300	C-League (3rd)
Tiffy Army	Kandal Province	AEU Sport Park	1,500	C-League (7th)
National Police Commissary	Sihanoukville Province	Sihanoukville Provincial Stadium	TBD	C-League (10th)
Phnom Penh Crown	Phnom Penh	Smart RSN Stadium	5,000	C-League (6th)
Preah Khan Reach Svay Rieng	Svay Rieng Province	Svay Rieng Stadium	3,000	C-League (Winner)
Soltilo Angkor	Siem Reap Province	SRU Stadium	5,000	C-League (11th)
Visakha	Phnom Penh	Prince Stadium	7,000	C-League (2nd)

=== Personnel and Kits ===
Team	Manager	Captain	Kit manufacturer	Main sponsor
Angkor Tiger	(Spain) Oriol Mohedano	(Cambodia) Pov Phearith	NT Sport	
Asia Euro United	(Cambodia) Sok Veasna	(Cambodia) Lay Raksmey	Tidal Sport	
Bati Academy	(Japan) Koji Gyotoku	(Cambodia) Ean Pisey	FBT	
Boeung Ket	(Cambodia) Kim Pheakdey	(Cambodia) Hong Pheng	EGO Sport	Cambodia Airways
Electricite du Cambodge	(Cambodia) Meas Samoeun	(Cambodia) Chhout Senteang		
Kirivong Sok Sen Chey	(Thailand) Ekapob Potisai	(Cambodia) Soch Rotha	NT Sport	E-GetS
Nagaworld	(Cambodia) Meas Channa	(Cambodia) Kouch Sokumpheak	FBT	NagaCorp
Tiffy Army	(Cambodia) Hor Sokheng	(Cambodia) Phuong Soksana	NT Sport	TIFFY
National Police Commissary	(Cambodia) Prak Sovannara	(Cambodia) Say Piseth	FAN	
Phnom Penh Crown	(Cambodia) Sum Vanna	(Cambodia) Orn Chanpolin	FBT	Smart Axiata
Preah Khan Reach Svay Rieng	(Republic of Ireland) Conor Nestor	(Cambodia) Soeuy Visal	FBT	Carabao
Soltilo Angkor	(Cambodia) Ouk Sareth	(Japan) Unno Tomoyuki	KakiJersi	
Visakha	(Northern Ireland) Colum Curtis	(Cambodia) Ngoy Srin	FORWARD	Prince Bank

== Foreign players ==
The number of foreign players is restricted to five per team. A team can use four foreign players on the field in each game, including at least one player from the AFC region.

Players name in bold indicates the player is registered during the mid-season transfer window.

Club	Player 1	Player 2	Player 3	Player 4	Asian Player	Former Players
Angkor Tiger	(Japan) Yudai Ogawa	(Japan) Takaki Ose			(Japan) Joichiro Sugiyama	(Nigeria) Dzarma Bata (Brazil) Cristiano
Asia Euro United	(Nigeria) Adekunjo Busayo	(Cameroon) Abbee Ndjoo	(Nigeria) **Samuel Ajayi**	(Nigeria) **George Bisan**	(Japan) Kanta Asami	(Afghanistan) Emran Walizada
Bati Academy*						
Boeung Ket	(Ivory Coast) Anderson Zogbe	(South Africa) Mothusi Gopane	(Nigeria) **Dzarma Bata**	(Japan) Kenta Yamazaki	(Japan) Hikaru Mizuno	(Brazil) Franc Paiva
Electricite du Cambodge*						
Kirivong Sok Sen Chey	(Guinea) Barry Lelouma	(Nigeria) **Rasheed Omokafe**	(Cameroon) **David Julien**		(Thailand) Santirad Weing-in	(Brazil) Magson Dourado (Brazil) Victor Cabral
Nagaworld	(South Africa) Shane Booysen	(Brazil) Marques Marcio	(Japan) Kiduko Naoto		(Japan) Yuta Naruse	(Nigeria) George Bisan
Tiffy Army	(Cameroon) Yannick Francois	(Brazil) Romário	(Brazil) **Cristiano**	(Brazil) **Magson Dourado**	(Japan) Mikito Endo	(South Korea) Park Sung-min (Nigeria) Rasheed Omokafe
National Police Commissary	(Nigeria) Mathew Osa	(Nigeria) Momoh Degule	(Nigeria) Okoro Osa Orobosa	(Cameroon) **Baldwin Ngwa**	(Japan) Tomohiro Masaki	(Ivory Coast) Abdel Kader Coulibali
Phnom Penh Crown	(Nigeria) Okereke Timothy	(Colombia) Andrés Nieto	(Brazil) Paulo Victor		(Japan) Masaaki Ideguchi	(Nigeria) Esoh Paul Omogba
Svay Rieng	(Cameroon) Befolo Mbarga	(United States) Jonny Campbell	(Brazil) Thiago Santos	(Brazil) Pedro Augusto	(Japan) Daisuke Kobayashi	
Soltilo Angkor	(Japan) Kento Fujihara	(Japan) Fumiya Kogure	(Japan) Unno Tomoyuki	(Brazil) Matheus Souza	(Japan) Motoyama Kota	
Visakha	(Nigeria) Ajayi Opeyemi Korede	(South Africa) Mohammed Khan	(Croatia) Filip Mihaljević	(Uzbekistan) Alisher Mirzaev	(Afghanistan) Mustafa Zazai	

*Note: Bati Academy and Electricite du Cambodge do not use foreign players.

== League table ==
Pos	Team	Pld	W	D	L	GF	GA	GD	Pts	Qualification (Note: Due to Covid-19 pandemic, teams are split into two groups (Top 6 and Bottom 7) after each have played 12 matches.)
1	Boeung Ket	17	12	5	0	47	16	+31	41	Qualification for 2021 AFC Cup group stage
2	Preah Khan Reach Svay Rieng	17	13	2	2	58	18	+40	41	
3	Phnom Penh Crown	17	9	6	2	42	14	+28	33	
4	Tiffy Army	17	8	3	6	26	29	−3	27	
5	Visakha	17	7	4	6	43	21	+22	25	Qualification for 2021 AFC Cup play-off round
6	Nagaworld	17	6	7	4	30	24	+6	25	
7	Angkor Tiger	18	11	3	4	35	22	+13	36	
8	Kirivong Sok Sen Chey	18	7	2	9	32	34	−2	23	
9	National Police Commissary	18	6	2	10	30	39	−9	20	
10	Asia Euro United	18	6	1	11	31	52	−21	19	
11	Soltilo Angkor	18	3	2	13	26	57	−31	11	
12	Electricite du Cambodge	18	2	5	11	25	52	−27	11	
13	Bati Academy	18	1	4	13	11	58	−47	7	Relegation to Cambodian Second League

Updated to match(es) played on 23 August 2020. Source: C-League Soccerway
Rules for classification: 1) Points; 2) Goal difference; 3) Goals scored.

== Results ==
Home \ Away	AKT	AEU	BAT	BKT	EDC	KRV	NAG	NDM	NPC	PPC	PKR	STL	VSK
Angkor Tiger	—		2–0	1–1		2–0	2–0						
Asia Euro United	0–3	—	4–0	1–3	1–1	1–0	2–4						
Bati Youth			—			1–3		0–0		0–7	0–10	1–2	0–6
Boeung Ket FC			6–1	—			1–1	6–1		3–1		3–0	1–0
EDC FC	2–2		2–0	2–4	—	2–2	1–5		0–3				
Kirivong Sok Sen Chey				1–4		—	1–1	0–1		0–6	2–4		0–2
Nagaworld FC			3–0				—	4–1	2–1	1–1	0–2	4–2	1–1
Tiffy Army	1–1	2–0			4–2			—	3–1			3–0	
National Police Commissary FC	2–4	3–2	1–1	0–3		1–4			—				
Phnom Penh Crown	1–0	6–0			3–0			2–3	4–0	—	0–0	2–2	2–2
Preah Khan Reach Svay Rieng FC	2–0	7–2		2–4	3–0			2–0	5–2		—	5–1	3–2
Soltilo Angkor	0–4	1–2			2–3	2–3			4–2			—	
Visakha	3–1	10–1			4–0			0–1	2–1			7–1	—

Updated to match(es) played on 22 August 2020. Source: C-League
Legend: Blue = home team win; Yellow = draw; Red = away team win.

== Top scorers ==
Rank	Player	Club	Goals
1	(Cameroon) Befolo Mbarga	Preah Khan Reach Svay Rieng	16
2	(Cambodia) Mat Noron	Boeung Ket	15
3	(Brazil) Pedro Augusto	Preah Khan Reach Svay Rieng	14
4	(Croatia) Filip Mihaljević	Visakha	13
4	(Nigeria) Mathew Osa	National Police Commissary	13
4	(Brazil) Matheus Souza	Soltilo Angkor	13
7	(Nigeria) Okereke Timothy	Phnom Penh Crown	12
7	(Cameroon) Abbee Ndjoo	Asia Euro United	12
9	(Brazil) Marques Marcio	Nagaworld	11
10	(Cambodia) Sieng Chanthea	Boeung Ket	9
10	(Cambodia) Reung Bunheing	Visakha	9
10	(Cambodia) Keo Sokpheng	Visakha	9
13	(Cambodia) Narong Kakada	Tiffy Army	8
13	(Cambodia) Prak Mony Udom	Preah Khan Reach Svay Rieng	8
15	(Brazil) Cristiano	Angkor Tiger / Tiffy Army	7
15	(Cambodia) Sean Sopheaktra	Electricite du Cambodge	7
15	(Brazil) Romário	Tiffy Army	7
15	(Brazil) Paulo Victor	Phnom Penh Crown	7
15	(Nigeria) Dzarma Bata	Angkor Tiger/ Boeung Ket	7
20	(Colombia) Andrés Nieto	Phnom Penh Crown	6
20	(Cambodia) Dav Nim	Kirivong Sok Sen Chey	6
22	(South Africa) Shane Booysen	Nagaworld	5
22	(Japan) Yuta Naruse	Nagaworld	5
22	(Japan) Daisuke Kobayashi	Preah Khan Reach Svay Rieng	5
22	(Cameroon) Baldwin Ngwa	National Police Commissary	5
22	(Cambodia) Tang Sopheak	Angkor Tiger	5
27	(Afghanistan) Emran Walizada	Asia Euro United	4
27	(Japan) Fumiya Kogure	Soltilo Angkor	4
27	(Brazil) Franc Paiva	Boeung Ket	4
27	(Nigeria) Ajayi Opeyemi Korede	Visakha	4
27	(South Africa) Mothusi Gopane	Boeung Ket	4
27	(Cambodia) Brak Thiva	Phnom Penh Crown	4
27	(Cambodia) Lim Pisoth	Phnom Penh Crown	4
27	(Cambodia) Sa Ty	Electricite du Cambodge	4
27	(Guinea) Barry Lelouma	Kirivong Sok Sen Chey	4
27	(Cambodia) Em Phanna	Kirivong Sok Sen Chey	4
27	(Cambodia) Chhoeung Visinu	Electricite du Cambodge	4
27	(Cambodia) Sovan Dauna	Angkor Tiger	4
27	(Thailand) Santirad Weing-in	Kirivong Sok Sen Chey	4
40	(Brazil) Jose Magson	Kirivong Sok Sen Chey	3
40	(Cambodia) Sos Suhana	Nagaworld	3
40	(Cambodia) Noun Borey	National Police Commissary	3
40	(Cambodia) Our Phearon	Boeung Ket	3
40	(Cambodia) Sareth Krya	Preah Khan Reach Svay Rieng	3
40	(Nigeria) Esoh Paul Omogba	Phnom Penh Crown	3
40	(Cambodia) Sok Chanraksmey	Asia Euro United	3
40	(Cambodia) Chou Sinti	Bati Youth	3
40	(Brazil) Thiago Santos	Preah Khan Reach Svay Rieng	3
40	(Cambodia) Kouch Dani	Nagaworld	3
40	(Nigeria) Samuel Ajayi	Asia Euro United	3
40	(Cambodia) Pring Chetra	Asia Euro United	3
40	(Cambodia) Long Phearath	Angkor Tiger	3
40	(Japan) Joichiro Sugiyama	Angkor Tiger	3
40	(Nigeria) Rasheed Omokafe	Tiffy Army / Kirivong Sok Sen Chey	3
40	(Cambodia) Seng Saravuthy	Kirivong Sok Sen Chey	3
56	(Cambodia) Chrerng Polroth	Visakha	2
56	(Ivory Coast) Anderson Zogbe	Boeung Ket	2
56	(Afghanistan) Mustafa Zazai	Visakha	2
56	(Cambodia) Ngoy Srin	Visakha	2
56	(Cambodia) Sin Sophanat	Visakha	2
56	(Cambodia) Nop David	Electricite du Cambodge	2
56	(Cambodia) Ly Mizan	Boeung Ket	2
56	(Cambodia) Ly Morslim	Soltilo Angkor	2
56	(Cambodia) Khoan Soben	Bati Youth	2
56	(Cambodia) Sok Daravuth	Tiffy Army	2
56	(Cameroon) Yannick Francois	Tiffy Army	2
56	(Nigeria) Okoro Osa Orobosa	National Police Commissary	2
56	(Japan) Yudai Ogawa	Angkor Tiger	2
56	(Cambodia) Seng Sambath	Bati Youth	2
56	(Cambodia) Keo Sarat	Angkor Tiger	2
56	(Cambodia) Chantha Chantheaka	Electricite du Cambodge	2
56	(Cambodia) Thy Leang	Bati Youth	2
56	(Cambodia) Sngoun Chunseng	Asia Euro United	2
56	(Cambodia) Hoy Phallin	Preah Khan Reach Svay Rieng	2
75	(Cambodia) Choun Chanchav	Phnom Penh Crown	1
75	(Ivory Coast) Abdel Kader Coulibali	National Police Commissary	1
75	(Cambodia) Chhim Sambo	Asia Euro United	1
75	(Cambodia) Nen Sothearoth	Preah Khan Reach Svay Rieng	1
75	(Cambodia) Sophal Udom	National Police Commissary	1
75	(Japan) Masaaki Ideguchi	Phnom Penh Crown	1
75	(Cambodia) Sath Rozak	Phnom Penh Crown	1
75	(Cambodia) Chan Vathanaka	Boeung Ket	1
75	(Cambodia) Yue Safy	Phnom Penh Crown	1
75	(Japan) Unno Tomoyuki	Soltilo Angkor	1
75	(Cambodia) Prak Chanratana	Soltilo Angkor	1
75	(Cambodia) Soeung Panha	Soltilo Angkor	1
75	(South Korea) Park Sung-min	Tiffy Army	1
75	(Cambodia) Lay Raksmey	Asia Euro United	1
75	(Cambodia) Samoeun Pidor	Preah Khan Reach Svay Rieng	1
75	(Cambodia) Ly Arifin	Soltilo Angkor	1
75	(Cambodia) Eam Ratana	Soltilo Angkor	1
75	(Cambodia) Chhout Senteang	Electricite du Cambodge	1
75	(Cambodia) Met Samel	National Police Commissary	1
75	(Cambodia) Such Rotha	Kirivong Sok Sen Chey	1
75	(Cambodia) Sath Rosib	Boeung Ket	1
75	(Cambodia) Thourng Da	Tiffy Army	1
75	(Cambodia) Soeuy Visal	Preah Khan Reach Svay Rieng	1
75	(Japan) Hikaru Mizuno	Boeung Ket	1
75	(Cambodia) Khim Borey	Nagaworld	1
75	(Cambodia) Mao Piseth	Phnom Penh Crown	1
75	(Cambodia) Roeurm Channroeurn	Tiffy Army	1
75	(Cambodia) Va Sokthorn	Nagaworld	1
75	(Japan) Tomohiro Masaki	National Police Commissary	1
75	(Cambodia) Phat Sokha	Bati Academy	1
75	(Japan) Takaki Ose	Angkor Tiger	1
75	(Cambodia) Som Vannith	National Police Commissary	1
75	(Cambodia) Soeuth Nava	Boeung Ket	1
75	(Cambodia) Chou Hao	Kirivong Sok Sen Chey	1
75	(Cambodia) Em Phanna	Kirivong Sok Sen Chey	1
75	(Cambodia) Chhom Pisa	Angkor Tiger	1
75	(Cambodia) Touch Roma	Tiffy Army	1
75	(Cambodia) Nub Tola	Preah Khan Reach Svay Rieng	1
75	(Cambodia) In Savdy	Kirivong Sok Sen Chey	1
75	(Cambodia) Chin Vannak	National Police Commissary	1
75	(Cambodia) Thorn Seyha	Angkor Tiger	1
75	(Cambodia) Moth Sattya	Angkor Tiger	1
75	(Cambodia) Leng Makara	Nagaworld	1
75	(Cambodia) Jung Sokha	Kirivong Sok Sen Chey	1
75	(Cambodia) Moun Nara	Electricite du Cambodge	1
75	(Nigeria) Momoh Degule	National Police Commissary	1
75	(Cambodia) Puun Socheat	Asia Euro United	1
75	(Cambodia) Heng Kimhong	Electricite du Cambodge	1
75	(Cambodia) Ean Pisey	Bati Academy	1
75	(Japan) Kenta Yamazaki	Boeung Ket	1
75	(Nigeria) George Bisan	Asia Euro United	1
75	(Cambodia) Dor Rozzan	Angkor Tiger	1
75	(Cambodia) Roth Samnang	Soltilo Angkor	1
75	(Cambodia) Sophal Dimong	Angkor Tiger	1
75	(Cambodia) Ly Duk	Soltilo Angkor	1
75	(Cambodia) Phoung Soksana	Tiffy Army	1
75	(Cambodia) Soun Sovan	Preah Khan Reach Svay Rieng	1
75	(Cambodia) Min Ratanak	Preah Khan Reach Svay Rieng	1

=== Hat-tricks ===
Player	For	Against	Result	Date
(Nigeria) Okereke Timothy	Phnom Penh Crown	Bati Academy	7–0	23 February
(Nigeria) Dzarma Bata	Angkor Tiger	Soltilo Angkor	4–0	23 February
(Afghanistan) Emran Walizada	Asia Euro United	Bati Academy	4–0	14 March
(Brazil) Pedro Augusto4	Preah Khan Reach Svay Rieng	Bati Academy	10–0	4 July
(Cameroon) Befolo Mbarga	Preah Khan Reach Svay Rieng	Bati Academy	10–0	4 July
(Cameroon) Befolo Mbarga	Preah Khan Reach Svay Rieng	Asia Euro United	7–2	11 July
(Brazil) Franc Paiva	Boeung Ket	Tiffy Army	6–1	18 July
(Nigeria) Okereke Timothy	Phnom Penh Crown	National Police Commissary	4–0	19 July
(Cambodia) Keo Sokpheng	Visakha	Asia Euro United	10–1	25 July
(Croatia) Filip Mihaljević	Visakha	Asia Euro United	10–1	25 July
(Brazil) Marques Marcio	Nagaworld	Asia Euro United	4–2	1 August
(Cambodia) Mat Noron	Boeung Ket	Electricite du Cambodge	4–2	2 August
(Cambodia) Mat Noron	Boeung Ket	Bati Youth	6–1	9 August
(Cameroon) Befolo Mbarga	Preah Khan Reach Svay Rieng	Tiffy Army	5–2	13 September
(Nigeria) Mathew Osa	National Police Commissary	Bati Academy	4–0	3 October
(Cambodia) Em Phanna	Kirivong Sok Sen Chey	Electricite du Cambodge	7–1	3 October

== Clean sheets ==
Rank	Player	Club	Clean sheets
1	(Cambodia) Um Vichet	Phnom Penh Crown	7
1	(Cambodia) Yi Bunheng	Angkor Tiger	7
3	(Cambodia) Aim Sovannarath	Preah Khan Reach Svay Rieng	6
4	(Cambodia) Keo Soksela	Visakha	4
4	(Cambodia) Hul Kimhuy	Boeung Ket	4
6	(Cambodia) Um Sereyroth	Tiffy Army	3
6	(Cambodia) Les Him	National Police Commissary	3
6	(Cambodia) Pich Dara	Tiffy Army	3
9	(Cambodia) Om Outdom	Preah Khan Reach Svay Rieng	2
9	(Cambodia) Kung Chanvuthy	Phnom Penh Crown	2
9	(Cambodia) Pich Rovinyothin	Asia Euro United	2
12	(Cambodia) Sarouth Thouth	Bati Academy	1
12	(Cambodia) Som Sokundara	Electricite du Cambodge	1
12	(Cambodia) Mean Kimhong	Asia Euro United	1
12	(Cambodia) Sou Yaty	Nagaworld	1
12	(Cambodia) Saveng Samnang	Phnom Penh Crown	1

== Attendances ==
=== Overall statistical table ===
Pos	Team	Total	High	Low	Average	Change
1	Angkor Tiger	4,159	2,659	1,500	2,079	n/a
2	Boeung Ket	4,130	2,500	1,630	2,065	n/a
3	Phnom Penh Crown	7,728	4,112	820	1,932	n/a
4	Visakha	5,049	2,573	1,200	1,683	n/a
5	Svay Rieng	3,311	1,253	1,008	1,104	n/a
6	National Police Commissary	1,100	1,100	1,100	1,100	n/a
7	Soltilo Angkor	1,970	1,750	220	985	n/a
8	Tiffy Army	1,567	1,354	213	783	n/a
9	Kirivong Sok Sen Chey	2,109	904	550	703	n/a
10	Nagaworld	1,035	915	120	517	n/a
11	Asia Euro United	970	500	170	323	n/a
12	Bati Academy	375	225	150	187	n/a
13	Electricite du Cambodge	63	63	63	63	n/a
	League total	33,566	4,112	63	1,118	n/a

== Matches ==
Fixtures and results of the 2020 C-League season.

=== Week 1 ===
15 February 2020	Bati Academy	0 - 0	Tiffy Army	Bati Academy Stadium, Takeo Province
15:30 UTC+07:30				Attendance: 150

15 February 2020	Phnom Penh Crown	3 - 0	EDC FC	RSN Stadium, Phnom Penh
18:00 UTC+07:30				Attendance: 1,076

15 February 2020	Visakha	2 - 1	National Police Commissary FC	Prince Stadium, Phnom Penh
18:00 UTC+07:30				Attendance: 2,573

16 February 2020	Asia Euro United	1 - 0	Kirivong Sok Sen Chey	AEU Sport Park, Kandal
15:30 UTC+07:30				Attendance: 500

16 February 2020	Angkor Tiger	1 - 1	Boeung Ket	SRU Stadium, Siem Reap
15:30 UTC+07:30				Attendance: 2,659

16 February 2020	Preah Khan Reach Svay Rieng FC	5 - 1	Soltilo Angkor	Svay Rieng Stadium, Svay Rieng Province
18:00 UTC+07:30				Attendance: 1,253

Bye: Nagaworld FC

=== Week 2 ===
22 February 2020	Boeung Ket	1 - 0	Visakha	Cambodia Airways Stadium, Phnom Penh
15:30 UTC+07:30				Attendance: 2,500

22 February 2020	Nagaworld FC	2 - 1	National Police Commissary FC	EDC Stadium, Phnom Penh
15:30 UTC+07:30				Attendance: 120

22 February 2020	Kirivong Sok Sen Chey	2 - 4	Preah Khan Reach Svay Rieng FC	Kirivong Stadium, Takeo Province
15:30 UTC+07:30				Attendance: 550

23 February 2020	Tiffy Army	2 - 0	Asia Euro United	AEU Sport Park, Kandal
15:30 UTC+07:30				Attendance: 213

23 February 2020	Soltilo Angkor	0 - 4	Angkor Tiger	SRU Stadium, Siem Reap
15:30 UTC+07:30				Attendance: 1,750

23 February 2020	Bati Youth	0 - 7	Phnom Penh Crown	Bati Academy Stadium, Takeo Province
15:30 UTC+07:30				Attendance: 225

Bye: EDC FC

=== Week 3 ===
29 February 2020	EDC FC	2 - 0	Bati Youth	EDC Stadium, Phnom Penh
15:30 UTC+07:30				Attendance: 63

29 February 2020	Boeung Ket	1 - 1	Nagaworld FC	Cambodia Airways Stadium, Phnom Penh
15:30 UTC+07:30				Attendance: 1,650

29 February 2020	Phnom Penh Crown	6 - 0	Asia Euro United	RSN Stadium, Phnom Penh
18:00 UTC+07:30				Attendance: 820

1 March 2020	Angkor Tiger	2 - 0	Kirivong Sok Sen Chey	SRU Stadium, Siem Reap
15:30 UTC+07:30				Attendance: 1,500

1 March 2020	Preah Khan Reach Svay Rieng FC	2 - 0	Tiffy Army	Svay Rieng Stadium, Svay Rieng Province
18:00 UTC+07:30				Attendance: 1,008

1 March 2020	Visakha	7 - 1	Soltilo Angkor	Prince Stadium, Phnom Penh
18:00 UTC+07:30				Attendance: 1,200

Bye: National Police Commissary FC

=== Week 4 ===
7 March 2020	Asia Euro United	1 - 1	EDC FC	AEU Sports Park, Kandal Province
15:30 UTC+07:30				Attendance: 170

7 March 2020	Nagaworld FC	4 - 2	Soltilo Angkor	SRU Stadium, Siem Reap
15:30 UTC+07:30				Attendance: 915

7 March 2020	National Police Commissary FC	0 - 3	Boeung Ket	Cambodia Airways Stadium, Phnom Penh
15:30 UTC+07:30				Attendance: 1,100

8 March 2020	Phnom Penh Crown	0 - 0	Preah Khan Reach Svay Rieng FC	RSN Stadium, Phnom Penh
15:30 UTC+07:30				Attendance: 4,112

8 March 2020	Tiffy Army	1 - 1	Angkor Tiger	SRU Stadium, Siem Reap
15:30 UTC+07:30				Attendance: 1,354

8 March 2020	Kirivong Sok Sen Chey	0 - 2	Visakha	Kirivong Stadium, Takeo Province
15:30 UTC+07:30				Attendance: 904

Bye: Bati Youth

=== Week 5 ===
14 March 2020	Asia Euro United	4 - 0	Bati Youth	AEU Sport Park, Kandal
15:30 UTC+07:30				Attendance: 300

14 March 2020	Preah Khan Reach Svay Rieng FC	3 - 0	EDC FC	Svay Rieng Stadium, Svay Rieng Province
18:00 UTC+07:30				Attendance: 1,050

14 March 2020	Visakha	0 - 1	Tiffy Army	Prince Stadium, Phnom Penh
18:00 UTC+07:30				Attendance: 1,276

15 March 2020	Kirivong Sok Sen Chey	1 - 1	Nagaworld FC	kirivong Stadium, Takeo Province
15:30 UTC+07:30				Attendance: 655

15 March 2020	Phnom Penh Crown	1 - 0	Angkor Tiger	RSN Stadium, Phnom Penh
15:30 UTC+07:30				Attendance: 1,720

15 March 2020	Soltilo Angkor	4 - 2	National Police Commissary FC	SRU Stadium, Siem Reap
15:30 UTC+07:30				Attendance: 220

Bye: Boeung Ket

== Awards ==
Awards	Nation/Name	Club
Top Scorer	(Cameroon) Befolo Mbarga	Preah Khan Reach
Player of the season	(Cambodia) Mat Noron	Boeung Ket
Goalkeeper of the season	(Cambodia) Hul Kimhuy	Boeung Ket
Coach of the season	(Cambodia) Kim Pheakdey	Boeung Ket

Awards	Club
Fair Play	Bati Youth

== See also ==
- 2020 Cambodian Second League
- 2020 Hun Sen Cup
