= 2007 Cambodian League =

Cambodian League
- Season: 2007
- Champions: Nagacorp

The 2007 Cambodian League season is the 23rd season of top-tier football in Cambodia. Statistics of Cambodian League for the 2007 season.

== Overview ==
It was contested by 8 teams, and Naga Corp FC won the championship.

== League standings ==
| Pos | Team | Pld | GD | Pts |
|---|---|---|---|---|
| 1 | Naga Corp FC | 14 | 69 | 38 |
| 2 | Khemara Keila FC | 14 | 37 | 30 |
| 3 | Phnom Penh Empire | 14 | 41 | 29 |
| 4 | Royal Cambodian Armed Forces FC | 14 | 12 | 17 |
| 5 | Build Bright University FC | 14 | -6 | 16 |
| 6 | Red Eagle FC | 14 | -11 | 16 |
| 7 | Lion FC | 14 | -19 | 14 |
| 8 | Baksey Chamkrong FC | 14 | -120 | 3 |

Updated to match(es) played on unknown. Source:
