= Argzim Redžović =

Montenegrin footballer

Personal information
- Date of birth: 26 February 1992 (age 34)
- Place of birth: Bar, Montenegro
- Height: 1.90 m (6 ft 3 in)
- Position: Defender

Team information
- Current team: Melaka
- Number: 24

Youth career
- –2010: Mogren

Senior career*
Years	Team	Apps	(Gls)
2010–2013	Mogren	8	(0)
2010–2011	→ Otrant-Olympic (loan)		
2011–2012	→ Igalo 1929 (loan)		
2013–2014	Kapfenberger SV	3	(0)
2013	Kapfenberger SV II	27	(2)
2014–2015	Malchower SV	42	(4)
2015–2016	Petrovac	11	(0)
2016	Iskra Danilovgrad	12	(0)
2016–2017	Lanexang United		
2017	Petrovac	20	(0)
2018–2019	PDRM	32	(2)
2020–2022	Terengganu II	2	(1)
2020–2025	Terengganu	33	(1)
2026–	Melaka	1	(0)

International career
2010–2011	Montenegro U19	6	(0)
- * Club domestic league appearances and goals as of 25 January 2025

Argzim Redžović (Montenegrin: арзгим реџовић; Albanian: Argzim Rexhoviq; born 26 February 1992) is a Montenegrin professional footballer who plays as a defender for Malaysia Super League club Melaka.

== Club career ==
=== Early career ===
Redžović started his professional football career with Montenegro club, Mogren where he got promoted in 2010.

Redžović also had a spell with Austrian club, Kapfenberger SV and played in the German Oberliga for Malchower SV. After that, Redžović joined Petrovac in 2015–16 Montenegrin First League season.

=== Lanexang United ===
Redžović departs Istra in June 2016 to play his trade abroad in Southeast Asia with Lanexang United of the Lao Premier League, Redžović was seen as an important player for the club, earning the man-of-the-match award in a 3–3 draw with Yadanarbon in the 2016 Mekong Club Championship and receiving an honorarium as well.

At the 2016 Mekong Club Championship, the Montenegrin defender suffered a fractured foot in the second half of the semi-final facing Boeung Ket Angkor.

=== Petrovac ===
In July 2017, Redžović returned back to his former club, Petrovac for short period of time.

=== PDRM ===
After his contract ended with Petrovac, Redžović joined Malaysian club, PDRM on 3 January 2018 to play in 2018 Malaysia Premier League season.

=== Terengganu ===
On 3 December 2019, Redžović joined Malaysian club, Terengganu in 2020 Malaysia Super League season.

=== Melaka ===
On 5 January 2026, Redžović joined Malaysian club, Melaka in 2025-26 Malaysia Super League season.

== International career ==
In October 2010, Redžović was called up to Montenegro U19 side for an international friendly match against Austria U19 however he was on the bench.

In March 2011, he was called up for an international friendly match where he make his debut on 8 March in a 3–0 lost to Turkey U19. On 31 May, Redžović played in the 2011 UEFA European Under-19 Championship elite qualification match against England U19 which would see Harry Kane to scored the winner in 51st minute.
