= Aaron Evans (footballer) =

Australian-born Singaporean professional footballer (born 1994)

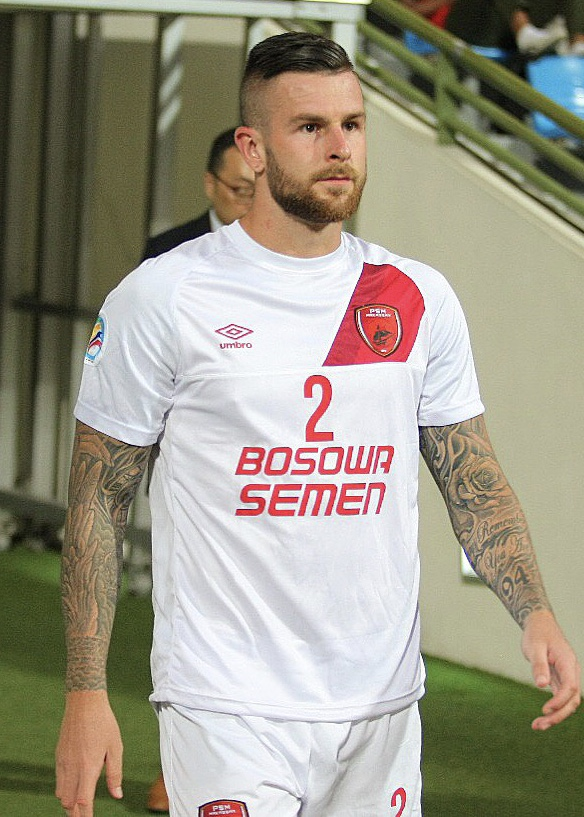
- Evans with PSM Makassar in the 2019 AFC Cup against Tampines Rovers at the Jalan Besar Stadium

Personal information
- Full name: Aaron Michael Evans
- Date of birth: 21 November 1994 (age 31)
- Place of birth: Canberra, Australia
- Height: 1.80 m (5 ft 11 in)
- Positions: Centre-back; defensive midfielder

Team information
- Current team: Tanjong Pagar United

Youth career
- 2005–2008: Capital Football Academy
- 2009–2010: ACT Academy of Sport

Senior career*
Years	Team	Apps	(Gls)
2011–2014	Canberra Croatia	64	(10)
2014	Tai Po	2	(0)
2015–2016	Kamphaengphet	51	(4)
2016	Lanexang United	0	(0)
2017–2018	Barito Putera	63	(2)
2019	PSM Makassar	29	(2)
2020–2022	PSS Sleman	31	(2)
2022	Persis Solo	1	(0)
2022–2023	NorthEast United	19	(2)
2024	Dandenong Thunder	4	(0)
2024	Abahani Limited Dhaka	4	(0)
2024–2025	Maziya	0	(0)
2025–	Tanjong Pagar United	5	(0)
- * Club domestic league appearances and goals as of 24 October 2025

Aaron Michael Evans (born 21 November 1994) is a professional footballer who plays as a centre-back or defensive midfielder for Singapore Premier League club Tanjong Pagar United.

A product of Capital Football Academy and ACT Academy of Sport, in 2011, Evans moved to his first senior club, playing with Canberra Croatia in the Capital Premier League as a 16-year-old.

== Youth career ==
Capital Football Academy

From U11 to U15, Evans was selected in the Capital Football Academy playing squads and participated in the Premier League competition. Whilst a member of the academy squad, Evans was selected to participate in the U14 and U15 Boys National Football Championships in Coffs Harbour.

ACT Academy of Sport (ACTAS)

Football scholarship with the ACT Academy of Sports for 2 years. During his scholarship, Evans toured Europe and Asia training and playing. Countries toured include England, Germany, Holland and China.

Australian Schoolboys

In January 2013 selected in the Australian U19 Schoolboys Squad to participate in a 3-week tour of Brazil and Argentina. Played games against Boca Juniors, Botafogo, Estudiantes. Evans was awarded the Man of the Match in the game vs Rosario. Also participated in two-day training camps at Boca Juniors and Botafogo.

== Club career ==
=== Canberra Croatia ===
Evans joined National Premier Leagues Capital Football club Canberra Croatia in 2011 commencing his senior career at 16 years old. During his debut season, he made 10 Premier League appearances. In June of the 2011 season, Evans travelled to Croatia and trained with Dinamo Zagreb for two weeks before playing with Canberra Croatia in the Croatian Club World Cup where they finished as runners-up.

He went on to make 64 appearances for Canberra Croatia before signing with Tai Po during the 2014 season as a 19-year-old.

During his time at Canberra Croatia, Evans trained with A-League teams Central Coast Mariners and Adelaide United. He also spent a short period training with Sydney Olympic in the National Premier League NSW.

=== Tai Po ===
On 5 September 2014, Evans signed his first professional contract with Hong Kong Premier League club Tai Po at 19-years old. Evans made his debut a few days later against Kitchee on 12 September. He went on to make 8 appearances for Tai Po in Premier League and Cup competitions.

=== Kamphaengphet ===
In January 2015, Evans transferred Thailand third-tier league Regional League Division 2 club, Kamphaengphet. He debuted for the club at the start of the 2015 season in February where he established himself as a first team player. Evans an instrumental role in getting Kamphaengphet into the round of 16 in the 2015 Thai FA Cup.

The 2016 season saw Kamphaengphet finish 2nd in the Northern Regional League Competition making the Champions League finals for the first time in club history, reaching the final 8 teams just missing promotion to Division 1. Kamphaeng Phet will now play in the 2017 Thai League 3 Upper Region.

By the end of the 2016 season, he had made 64 appearances and scored 4 goals.

=== Lanexang United ===
At the completion of an outstanding 2016 season, Evans signed with the newly crowned Lao Premier League champions Lanexang United. Lanexang United who will compete in the 2016 Mekong Club Championship and the 2017 AFC Cup Group Stage. He debuted for Lanexang United on 5 November 2016 in Vientiane in the opening Toyota Mekong Club Championship game vs SHB Da Nang coming on as a sub in the second half. Lanexang United won the game 2–1. On 27 December 2016 he made his starting debut vs Yadanarbon at the Mandalar Thiri Stadium in Myanmar. Lanexang United drew the game 3 -3 and progressed to the semi-finals of the Mekong Club Championships where they met Boeung Ket Angkor in Phnom Penh. Lanexang won the semi-final 3–0 and play against Buriram United in the two legged final on 4 January 2017 and 8 January 2017. In the first leg of the final Lanexang United won 1–0. After good performances during the Mekong Cup, he was selected to play in the Laos Premier League All-Stars squad. The squad played against Thai League 1 club Muangthong United in a game in Vientiane.

=== Barito Putera ===
After the demise of Lanexang United, Evans signed with Barito Putera in January 2017 for the 2017 President's Cup and 2017 Liga 1 competitions. Debuting on 7 February 2017 in a Presidents Cup game against Borneo Samarinda, which ended 0–0, his Liga 1 debut came on 15 April 2017 in the season opening game against Mitra Kukar in a home match at May 17th Stadium. Barito won the game 2–1. After a good start to the league he scored his first goal in the third game when Barito played Perseru Serui. He went on to play every minute of all 17 games played in Leg 1. At the completion of the 2017 Liga 1 season, Evans had played 31 games as a centre-back and defensive midfielder. His performances throughout the 2017 season saw him offered a contract extension for the 2018 Liga 1 season.

=== PSM Makassar ===
Evans signed with PSM Makassar for the 2019 Liga 1 season on 14 January 2019. He debuted on 26 January 2019 in a 2018–19 Piala Indonesia game vs Kalteng Putra with PSM winning 2–1. He played in his debut AFC Cup match against Home United at Jalan Besar Stadium in Singapore on 27 February 2019. His Liga 1 debut game against Semen Padang was in the first round on 20 May 2019. PSM won 1–0 and Evans played 90 mins.

He scored his first goal for PSM playing in the second leg of the 2019 AFC Cup ASEAN Semi final against Vietnamese club Becamex Binh Duong, with PSM winning the game 2–1. PSM made the final of the 2018–19 Piala Indonesia. The two legged final resulted in Persija Jakarta winning the first leg 1–0 at home. The second leg in Makassar saw PSM win 2–0 with Evans scoring the first goal and then providing an assist for the second. As a result, PSM became Piala Indonesia Champions and earned the right to play in 2020 AFC Cup. The Piala Indonesia Final Leg 1 played at Gelora Bung Karno Stadium in Jakarta was played in front of 70,306 fans, making it the 15th highest attendance at a football game in the world in 2019.

=== PSS Sleman ===
Evans joined PSS Sleman on 29 January 2020 for the 2020 Liga 1 season. His debut for PS Sleman came in Round 1 of Liga 1 against PSM Makassar at Andi Mattalata Stadium in Maksassar on 1 March 2020. PSM won the game 2–1. He scored his first goal for PSS against Persib Bandung in Round 3 in Bandung. After the suspension of Liga 1 2020 due to COVID-19, he re-signed for the 2021 Liga 1 season. His first appearance for the season was in the second game of the pre season 2021 Menpora Cup against Persela.

=== NorthEast United ===
After spending six years in Indonesia, Evans signed for Indian Super League club NorthEast United on 25 September 2022. On 8 October 2022, he made his Indian Super League debut coming on as a late substitute in their controversial 1–0 away defeat to Bengaluru. He scored his first goal for the club in a 2–1 lost to ATK Mohun Bagan on 10 November. Evans spent one season at the club and registered 19 league appearances and scored two goals.

=== Dandenong Thunder ===
After six months without a club, Evans returned to his homeland in January 2024 signing for Dandenong Thunder in the NPL Victoria. He make his debut on 10 February 2024 in a 2–1 lost to Hume City. Evans made 4 appearances for the club and departed in March 2024.

=== Abahani Limited Dhaka ===
After a brief stint in his homeland, Evans returned to South Asia signing for Bangladesh Premier League side Abahani Limited Dhaka on 18 March 2024. He make his debut in a 1–1 draw to Fortis on 4 April. Evans made 4 appearances for the club and left at the end of the season.

=== Maziya ===
On 14 September 2024, Evans signed for Dhivehi Premier League club Maziya. Evans also appeared in all three of the club 2024–25 AFC Challenge League group stage matches.

=== Tanjong Pagar United ===
On 9 July 2025, Singapore Premier League club Tanjong Pagar United announced an agreement with Maziya for the transfer of Evans.

== Career statistics ==
=== Club ===
As of 24 February 2023

Club	Season	League			Cup		Continental		Total	
Club	Season	Division	Apps	Goals	Apps	Goals	Apps	Goals	Apps	Goals
Canberra Croatia	2011–12	National Premier Leagues; Capital Football	21	2	0	0	—		21	2
Canberra Croatia	2012–13	National Premier Leagues; Capital Football	21	2	0	0	—		21	2
Canberra Croatia	2013–14	National Premier Leagues; Capital Football	22	6	0	0	—		22	6
Canberra Croatia	Total		64	10	0	0	0	0	64	10
Tai Po	2014–15	Hong Kong Premier League	2	0	2 (Note: Appearance(s) in HKFA League Cup)	0	—		4	0
Kamphaengphet	2015	Regional League Northern Region	26	2	5	0	—		31	2
Kamphaengphet	2016	Regional League Northern Region	25	2	1	0	—		26	2
Kamphaengphet	Total		51	4	6	0	0	0	57	4
Lanexang United	2016	Mekong Club Championship	0	0	0	0	5	0	5	0
Barito Putera	2017	Liga 1	31	1	3	0	—		34	1
Barito Putera	2018	Liga 1	32	1	1	0	—		33	1
Barito Putera	Total		63	2	4	0	0	0	67	2
PSM Makassar	2019	Liga 1	29	2	12 (Note: Appearance(s) in Indonesia Cup) (Note: Appearance(s) in Indonesia President's Cup)	2	6 (Note: Appearance(s) in AFC Cup)	1	47	5
PSS Sleman	2020	Liga 1	3	1	0	0	—		3	1
PSS Sleman	2021	Liga 1	28	1	6 (Note: Appearance(s) in Menpora Cup)	0	—		34	1
PSS Sleman	Total		31	2	6	0	0	0	37	2
Persis Solo	2022–23	Liga 1	1	0	4	0	—		5	0
NorthEast United	2022–23	Indian Super League	19	2	0	0	—		19	2
Career total			260	22	34	2	11	1	305	25

== Honours ==
PSM Makassar

- Piala Indonesia: 2018–19

PSS Sleman

- Menpora Cup third place: 2021
