= Be Makara =

Cambodian football manager

Personal information
- Full name: Be Makara
- Date of birth: 7 May 1977 (age 49)
- Place of birth: Phnom Penh, Cambodia
- Height: 1.75 m (5 ft 9 in)

Team information
- Current team: Boeung Ket (manager)

Managerial career
- Years: Team
- 2010–2012: Phnom Penh Corwn
- 2012–: Boeung Ket

Be Makara is a Cambodian football manager who is currently in charge of the Cambodian Premier League club Boeung Ket.
