= 2006 Cambodian League =

Cambodian League
- Season: 2006
- Champions: Khemara Keila FC

The 2006 Cambodian League season is the 22nd season of top-tier football in Cambodia. Statistics of the Cambodian League for the 2006 season.

== Overview ==
It was contested by 10 teams, and Khemara Keila FC won the championship.

== League standings ==
Pos	Team	Pld	W	D	L	GF	GA	GD	Pts
1	Khemara Keila FC	4	3	1	0	18	2	+16	10
2	Nagacorp FC	4	3	1	0	17	5	+12	10
3	Phnom Penh United	4	3	1	0	14	3	+11	10
4	Keila Rith	4	3	0	1	13	5	+8	9
5	Koh Kong Province	4	2	0	2	6	7	−1	6
6	Military Police	4	1	1	2	10	11	−1	4
7	Khmer Empire	3	1	0	2	7	17	−10	3
8	RCAF	4	1	0	3	8	12	−4	3
9	Royal Navy	3	0	0	3	0	14	−14	0
10	General Logistics	4	0	0	4	2	19	−17	0

Source: RSSSF

Note: Resumed Sep 2 after a break of 4 months due to financial problems in the wake of a power struggle within the CFA which led to a temporary suspension by the AFC; league eventually played over 9 rounds instead of 18 as originally planned.

== Top final table ==
Pos	Club
1	Phnom Penh United
2	Khemara Keila FC
3	Nagacorp FC
4	Keila Rith

== Semifinals ==
- 07 Oct 2006 Phnomh Penh United 5-1 Keila Rith
- 07 Oct 2006 Khemara Keila FC 2-1 Nagacorp

== Final ==
- 14 Oct 2006 Phnomh Penh United 4-5 Khemara Keila FC
