= Elroy van der Hooft =

Dutch footballer (born 1990)

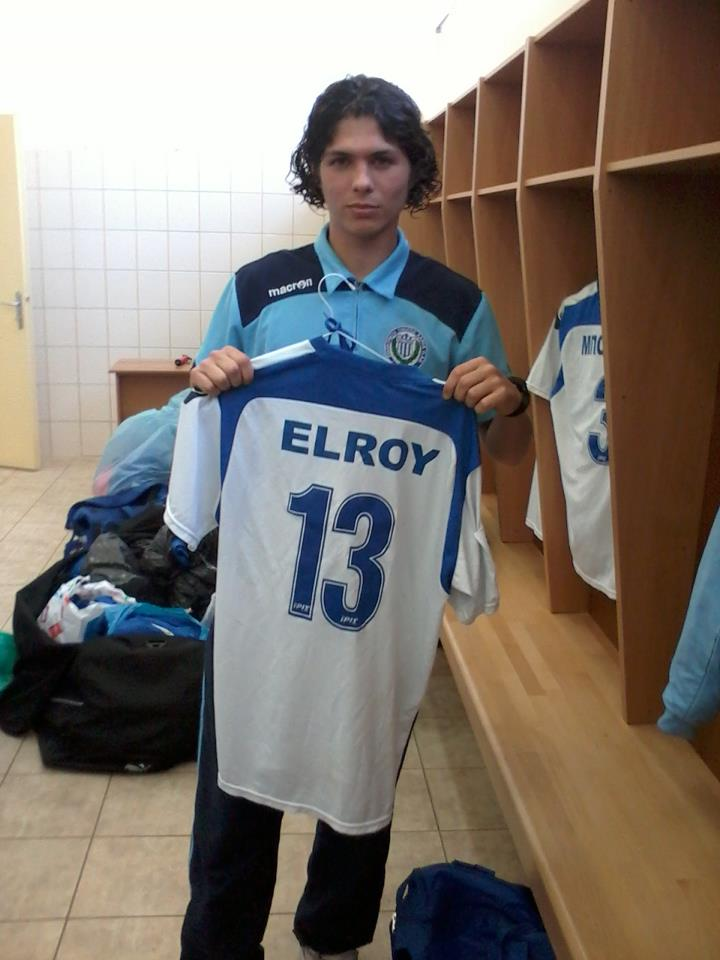

Personal information
- Date of birth: 20 April 1990 (age 36)
- Place of birth: Zeven, Germany
- Position: Forward

Youth career
- 2000–2006: Ajax
- 2006–2008: ADO Den Haag
- 2009–2010: RKC
- 2010–2011: VV UDO

Senior career*
Years	Team	Apps	(Gls)
2011	AO Chania	5	(0)
2012–2013	Persekap Pasuruan	9	(0)
2013–2014	Phnom Penh Crown		
2014	Boeung Ket Angkor		
2014	TriAsia Phnom Penh		
2017–2019	VV UDO		
2020	Chigatoy FC	1	(0)
2021	FC Oegstgeest		
2021–	Sporting Leiden		
- * Club domestic league appearances and goals

Elroy van der Hooft (born April 20, 1990, in Zeven, Germany) is a Dutch footballer who most recently played for Sporting Leiden.

== Career ==
Sealing a move to AO Chania of the Greek third level in 2011, his first professional experience, van der Hooft was not paid there, however, leaving after six months. Tried out for Indonesian side Gresik United in late 2012.

Moving to Persekap Pasuruan of the Indonesian second division in 2013, van der Hooft registered too late so he penned a three-month contract with Phnom Penh Crown of the Cambodian League instead, wearing the number 49 and authoring a hat-trick on his debut in a 3–1 win over Kirivong Sok Sen Chey.

=== Addictions ===
He was also the highest paid player in Cambodia at the time and was sometimes referred to as the "Cristiano Ronaldo of Cambodia". However, after his spell with Phnom Penh Crown, van der Hooft became an incorrigible drug and gambling addict, constantly inebriated as well. Then, back in the Netherlands, for driving a hacker who was wanted by the police and other offenses he was arrested and jailed for 70 days. Upon release in 2017, the Dutch midfielder returned to former youth team VV UDO.

He joined Sporting Leiden from fellow amateur side FC Oegstgeest in 2021.
