= 2005 Cambodian League =

Cambodian League
- Season: 2005
- Champions: Khemara Keila FC
- Top goalscorer: Hok Sochivorn (22 goals)

The 2005 Cambodian League season is the 21st season of top-tier football in Cambodia. Statistics of the Cambodian League for the 2005 season.

== Overview ==
Khemara Keila FC won the championship.

== Teams ==
10 participants:

- Hello United
- Nagacorp
- Khemara Keila FC
- Royal Navy
- Royal Cambodian Armed Force (RCAF)
- Army Division of Logistics (General Logistics)
- Military Police
- Kandal Province
- Koh Kong Province
- Siem Reap Province

== Top of table ==
The top four team qualified to championship play-off

- Khemara Keila FC
- Hello United
- Military Police
- Nagacorp

== Championship play-off ==
=== Semi-finals ===
05 Oct 2005 Hello United 4-2 Nagacorp

06 Oct 2005 Khemara Keila 2-1 Military Police

=== Third place ===
Military Police	3-0	Nagacorp
Houy Sy 18'; Khlem Hun 66'; Om Sen 68'

=== Final ===
9 Oct 2005

Khemara Keila	3-0	Hello United
Kouch Sokumpheak 73', 81'; Ike Michael 90'
