= Soukaphone Vongchiengkham =

Laotian footballer

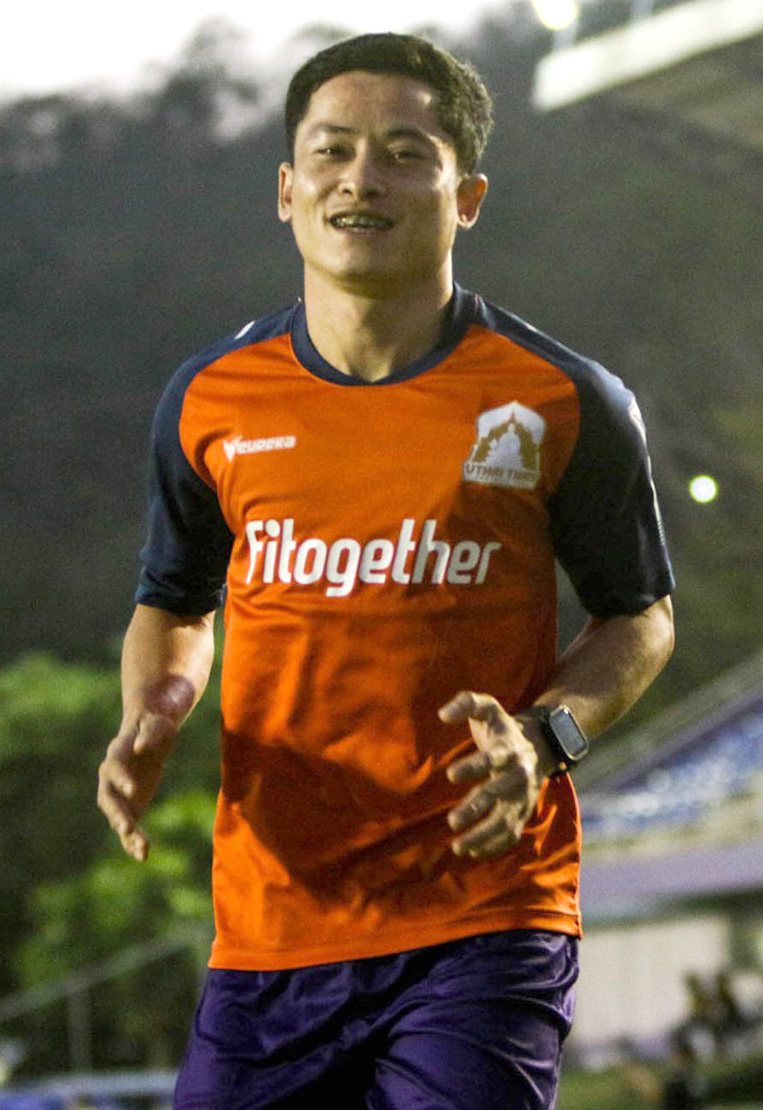
- Soukpaphone with Uthai Thani in 2021

Personal information
- Full name: Soukaphone Vongchiengkham
- Date of birth: 9 March 1992 (age 34)
- Place of birth: Champasak, Laos
- Height: 1.56 m (5 ft 1 in)
- Position: Midfielder

Team information
- Current team: Salavan United
- Number: 7

Youth career
- 2009–2011: BEC Tero Sasana

Senior career*
Years	Team	Apps	(Gls)
2010–2011	Ezra	30	(?)
2012–2013	Krabi	26	(9)
2014	Phitsanulok	2	(0)
2014	Saraburi		
2015	Lanexang United	20	(?)
2016	Ezra		
2016	Lanexang United	26	(?)
2017	Vientiane	14	(?)
2018	Sisaket	4	(1)
2018–2019	Chainat Hornbill	15	(1)
2019–2020	PT Prachuap	1	(0)
2020–2021	Uthai Thani	14	(0)
2021	Udon Thani	15	(3)
2021–2022	Kasetsart	14	(0)
2022–2023	Trat	31	(0)
2023–2025	Nakhon Si United	46	(0)
2025–	Mazda GB	2	(0)
2026–	Salavan United	3	(0)

International career^{‡}
2014	Laos U23	3	(0)
2010–2023	Laos	57	(15)
- * Club domestic league appearances and goals as of 5 November 2023 (UTC) ‡ National team caps and goals as of 12:59, 30 December 2022 (UTC)

Soukaphone Vongchiengkham (Lao: ສຸກອາພອນ ວົງຈຽງຄໍາ, Thai: สุกอาพอน วงเจียงคำ; born 9 March 1992) is a Laotian professional football player who plays as a midfielder for Salavan United in Lao League 1.

== International goals ==
Scores and results list Laos' goal tally first.

#	Date	Venue	Opponent	Score	Result	Competition
1.	24 October 2010	New Laos National Stadium, Vientiane, Laos	Philippines	1–0	2–2	2010 AFF Championship qualification
2.	26 October 2010	New Laos National Stadium, Vientiane, Laos	Timor-Leste	2–1	6–1	2010 AFF Championship qualification
3.	16 February 2011	New Laos National Stadium, Vientiane, Laos	Chinese Taipei	1–1	1–1	2012 AFC Challenge Cup qualification
4.	23 July 2011	Kunming Tuodong Sports Center, Kunming, China	China	1–0	2–7	2014 FIFA World Cup qualification
5.	4 March 2013	New Laos National Stadium, Vientiane, Laos	Sri Lanka	1–0	4–2	2014 AFC Challenge Cup qualification
6.	16 November 2013	New Laos National Stadium, Vientiane, Laos	Guam	1–0	1–1	Friendly
7.	14 October 2014	New Laos National Stadium, Vientiane, Laos	Brunei	1–0	4–2	2014 AFF Championship qualification
8.	14 October 2014	New Laos National Stadium, Vientiane, Laos	Brunei	2–0	4–2	2014 AFF Championship qualification
9.	14 October 2014	New Laos National Stadium, Vientiane, Laos	Brunei	4–1	4–2	2014 AFF Championship qualification
10.	18 October 2014	New Laos National Stadium, Vientiane, Laos	Timor-Leste	2–0	2–0	2014 AFF Championship qualification
11.	18 October 2016	Phnom Penh Olympic Stadium, Phnom Penh, Cambodia	Timor-Leste	2–1	2–1	2016 AFF Championship qualification
12.	21 October 2016	RSN Stadium, Phnom Penh, Cambodia	Brunei	1–1	4–3	2016 AFF Championship qualification
13.	31 May 2019	New Laos National Stadium, Vientiane, Laos	Sri Lanka	1–2	2–2	Friendly
14.	31 May 2019	New Laos National Stadium, Vientiane, Laos	Sri Lanka	2–2	2–2	Friendly
15.	30 December 2022	Thuwunna Stadium, Yangon, Myanmar	Myanmar	1–0	2–2	2022 AFF Championship

== Honours ==
Lanexang United:

• Mekong Club Championship: runner-up 2016

Individual

- Thai League Dream ASEAN XI: 2023
