= 2009 Cambodian League =

Cambodian League
- Season: 2009
- Champions: Nagacorp
- Top goalscorer: Justine Uche Prince (21 goals)

The 2009 Cambodian League season is the 25th season of top-tier football in Cambodia. Statistics of Cambodian League for the 2009 season.

== League table ==
Pos	Team	Pld	W	D	L	GF	GA	GD	Pts	Qualification or relegation
1	Phnom Penh Crown	18	13	3	2	44	22	+22	42	Qualification for playoffs
2	Preah Khan Reach	18	11	3	4	37	21	+16	36	Qualification for playoffs
3	Khemara Keila	18	10	5	3	40	21	+19	35	Qualification for playoffs
4	Nagacorp	18	10	3	5	44	26	+18	33	Qualification for playoffs
5	Kirivong Sok Sen Chey	18	7	3	8	34	36	−2	24	
6	National Defense Ministry	18	6	6	6	22	26	−4	24	
7	Build Bright United	18	6	4	8	27	35	−8	22	
8	Spark FC	18	5	6	7	30	37	−7	21	
9	Post Tel Club	18	3	2	13	16	41	−25	11	Relegation
10	Phu Chung Neak	18	0	3	15	17	46	−29	3	Relegation

Updated to match(es) played on September 16, 2009. Source:
Rules for classification: 1) points; 2) goal difference; 3) number of goals scored.

== Playoffs ==
=== Semi-finals ===
2009-09-13

Phnom Penh Crown	0 - 2	Naga Corp
	Report	Okonkwo Patrick 15'; Friday Nwakuna 81'

Olympic Stadium

2009-09-13

Khemara Keila	2 - 0	Preah Khan Reach
Sok Rithy 43' (o.g.); Nelson Oladiji 83'	Report

Olympic Stadium

=== Third place ===
2009-09-26

Phnom Penh Crown FC	1 - 2	Preah Khan Reach
Chan Rithy 8'		Sam El Nasa 30'; Khoun Laboravy 42'

Olympic Stadium

=== Final ===
2009-09-26
16:00

Naga Corp	2 - 1 (a.e.t.)	Khemara Keila
Okonkwo Patrick 102', 114'	Report	Kao Ravuth 120'

Olympic Stadium

Cambodian League
2009 winners
Naga Corp
2nd title

== Top scorers ==
Rank	Player	Club	Goals
1	Justine Uche Prince	Spark FC	21
2	Oladiji Nelson Olatunde	Khemara Keila FC	14
3	Ononiwu Chukwuma Julius	Kirivong Sok Sen Chey	13
4	Onyemrrela Olisaemeka	Preah Khan Reach	12
4	Okonkwo Sunday Patrick	Nagacorp	12
4	Kouch Sokumpheak	Khemara Keila FC	12
7	Akeep Tunji Ayoyinka	Phnom Penh Crown FC	9
7	Keo Sokngon	Phnom Penh Crown FC	9
9	Ousmanou Mohamadou	Phnom Penh Crown FC	7
9	Om Kumpheak	National Defense	7
