= 1996 Cambodian League =

Cambodian League
- Season: 1996

The 1996 Cambodian League season is the 15th season of top-tier football in Cambodia. Statistics of the Cambodian League for the 1996 season.

== Overview ==
Body Guards Club won the championship.
