= 1994 Cambodian League =

Cambodian League
- Season: 1994

The 1994 Cambodian League season is the 13th season of top-tier football in Cambodia. Statistics of the Cambodian League for the 1994 season.

== Overview ==
Civil Aviation won the championship.
