= Koy Salim =

Cambodian footballer (born 2002)

Personal information
- Full name: Koy Salim
- Date of birth: 10 December 2002 (age 23)
- Place of birth: Cambodia
- Height: 1.79 m (5 ft 10 in)
- Position: Goalkeeper

Team information
- Current team: Boeung Ket
- Number: 1

Youth career
- 2018–2020: Bati Academy

Senior career*
Years	Team	Apps	(Gls)
2021–	Boeung Ket	69	(0)

International career^{‡}
- Cambodia U18
- Cambodia U19
- Cambodia U23
2026–	Cambodia	1	(0)
- * Club domestic league appearances and goals as of 9 November 2026 ‡ National team caps and goals as of 30 August 2026

Koy Salim (Khmer: កយ សាលីម; born 10 December 2002) is a Cambodian professional footballer who plays as goalkeeper for Cambodian Premier League club Boeung Ket and the Cambodia national football team.

== Club career ==
Salim started his professional football career after joining Boeung Ket in 2021 and made his senior debut in the Cambodian Premier League on 19 November 2021 against Phnom Penh Crown.

== International career ==
Salim made his senior international debut in the 2026 ASEAN Championship against Vietnam on 7 August 2026.

== Honours ==
=== Individual ===
- Cambodian Premier League 'Team of the Year': 2025–26
