= 1988 Cambodian League =

Cambodian League
- Season: 1988

The 1988 Cambodian League season is the 7th season of top-tier football in Cambodia. Statistics of the Cambodian League for the 1988 season.

== Overview ==
Kampong Cham Province won the championship.
