= 1984 Cambodian League =

Cambodian League
- Season: 1984

The 1984 Cambodian League season is the 3rd season of top-tier football in Cambodia. Statistics of the Cambodian League for the 1984 season.

== Overview ==
Ministry of Commerce FC won the championship.
