= 1990 Cambodian League =

Football league season

Cambodian League
- Season: 1990

The 1990 Cambodian League season is the 9th season of top-tier football in Cambodia. Statistics of the Cambodian League for the 1990 season.

== Overview ==
Ministry of Transports won the championship.
