= 1982 Cambodian League =

Cambodian League
- Season: 1982

The 1982 Cambodian League season is the 1st season of top-tier football in Cambodia. Statistics of the Cambodian League for the 1982 season.

== Overview ==
Ministry of Commerce FC won the championship.
