= Aarun Lim =

Cambodian footballer (born 2003)

Lim Aarun
Personal information
- Full name: Lim Aarun Raymond
- Date of birth: 25 June 2003 (age 23)
- Place of birth: Hamilton, New Zealand
- Height: 1.80 m (5 ft 11 in)
- Position: Defensive midfielder

Team information
- Current team: Boeung Ket
- Number: 27

Youth career
- 2020: Melville United AFC
- 2020–2021: Boeung Ket

Senior career*
Years	Team	Apps	(Gls)
2021–2022	Boeung Ket	0	(0)
2022	→ Kirivong Sok Sen Chey (loan)	9	(0)
2023	Nagaworld	0	(0)
2023–2025	Tiffy Army	44	(1)
2025–	Boeung Ket	19	(0)

International career
2020–2022	Cambodia U19		
2025	Cambodia U23	1	(0)
- * Club domestic league appearances and goals as of 26 October 2026

Aarun Raymond Lim (Khmer: លឹម អារុណ; born 25 June 2003) is a professional footballer who plays as a defensive midfielder. Born in New Zealand, he has represented Cambodia at youth level.

== Early life ==
Lim was born to a Cambodian father and New Zealand (European) mother. He is also of Chinese descent. Lim attended Hillcrest High School and St Paul's Collegiate School in New Zealand. Lim has two brothers. He has regarded Japan international Keisuke Honda as his football idol.

== Career ==
Lim trained with the youth academy of Spanish La Liga side Valencia. As a youth player, he joined the youth academy of New Zealand side Melville United. He was described as a key player for the U-19 team". Lim was first called up to represent Cambodia internationally at youth level for the 2020 Japan-ASEAN U19 Men's Football Tournament.

Lim was promoted to the senior team of Cambodian side Boeung Ket before the 2021 season. He suffered an injury while playing for the club. In 2023, he signed for Cambodian side NagaWorld, where he was regarded to have performed well for the club. He received media attention due to his physical appearance. Lim mainly operates as a midfielder and is known for his defensive ability.

In 2021, Lim was appointed Goodwill Ambassador for Social Responsibility of the Asian Football Confederation.
