= Mothusi Gopane =

South African soccer player (born 1992)

Personal information
- Date of birth: 28 January 1992 (age 33)
- Place of birth: Limpopo, South Africa
- Height: 1.79 m (5 ft 10 in)
- Position(s): Wing-back; winger

Senior career*
Years	Team	Apps	(Gls)
2012-2014	Polokwane City	40	(4)
2015	SuperSport United	4	(0)
2016	Free State Stars	4	(0)
2017	Mbombela United	4	(0)
- Baberwa
2020–2021	Boeung Ket		
- * Club domestic league appearances and goals

Mothusi Gopane (born 28 January 1992) is a South African former soccer player who played as a midfielder or winger.

== Career ==
Gopane started his career with South African second division side Polokwane City, where he made 40 league appearances and scored 4 goals.

Before the second half of 2014–15, Gopane signed for SuperSport United in the South African top flight, where he made four league appearances.

In 2017, Gopane signed for South African second division club Mbombela United, but suffered a year-long injury. He was dropped by the club because of this. After that, he rejected an offer Cape Town Spurs in the South African top flight due to injury, before joining South African third division team Baberwa FC.

Before the 2020 season, he signed for Boeung Ket in Cambodia.

Recently, he was recognized for playing the most minutes in a season last campaign.
