= Alireza Jamali =

Iranian footballer

Personal information
- Date of birth: 1 April 1990 (age 36)
- Place of birth: Abadan, Iran
- Height: 1.79 m (5 ft 10 in)
- Position: Midfielder

Team information
- Current team: Sanat Naft Abadan F.C.

Senior career*
Years	Team	Apps	(Gls)
2007–2008	Foolad F.C.		
2008–2009	PAS Hamedan F.C.		
2009–2011	Paykan F.C.		
2011–20xx	Pachanga Diliman F.C.		
2012	Sanat Naft Abadan F.C.		
2012–2013	Foolad F.C.		
2013–2014	Mes Rafsanjan F.C.		
2014	S.C. Covilhã→(loan)	1	(0)
2014–2015	Naft Omidiyeh F.C.		
2015–2016	Lanexang United F.C.		
2016–2017	Lusitano VRSA	2	(0)
2017	Saba Qom F.C.		
2017–	Sanat Naft Abadan F.C.		
- * Club domestic league appearances and goals

Alireza Jamali (Persian: علیرضا جمالی born 1 April 1990 in Tehran, Iran) is an Iranian professional footballer who presently plays for Sanat Naft Abadan F.C. of the Persian Gulf Pro League. A native of Abadan, Iran, Jamali can operate in several positions including center midfield, attacking midfield, and forward.

== Career ==
=== Portugal ===
Back in 2016, S.L. Benfica subordinate Lusitano VRSA got Jamali's services, with the midfielder starting his first match in a 4–2 loss to Louletano D.C. in the Campeonato de Portugal. Having an amicable relationship with his coach, Ricardo Sousa, Jamali was praised by him, with Sousa saying that Jamali was fit for the team.

=== Philippines ===
Becoming a Pachanga Diliman F.C. player in 2011, the Iranian netted two goals in three appearances in the second half of the 2013 United Football League.

=== Lanexang ===
Set to join Lao Premier League champions Lanexang United in 2015, Jamali lifted the 2015 Lao Prime Minister's Cup with them, helping the team with a solid performance in the group stage by providing a goal and assist in a 6–2 beating of Lao Police Club.

The Iranian media spread rumors that he was on the verge of going to a Serbian club but the deal never happened.
