= 1998 Cambodian League =

Cambodian League
- Season: 1998

The 1998 Cambodian League season was the 17th season of top-tier football in Cambodia.

== Overview ==
Royal Dolphins won the championship.
