= 1983 Cambodian League =

Cambodian League
- Season: 1983

The 1983 Cambodian League season is the 2nd season of top-tier football in Cambodia. Statistics of the Cambodian League for the 1983 season.

== Overview ==
Ministry of Commerce FC won the championship.
