= 1991 Cambodian League =

Cambodian League
- Season: 1991

The 1991 Cambodian League season is the 10th season of top-tier football in Cambodia. Statistics of the Cambodian League for the 1991 season.

== Overview ==
Municipal Constructions won the championship.
