= Lay Raksmey =

Cambodian footballer

Lay Raksmey ឡាយ រស្មី
Personal information
- Date of birth: 29 October 1989 (age 37)
- Place of birth: Cambodia
- Height: 1.77 m (5 ft 10 in)
- Position: Defender

Senior career*
Years	Team	Apps	(Gls)
2007–2019	Svay Rieng		
2019–2022	Asia Euro United		

International career
2009–2011	Cambodia U-23		
2008–2013	Cambodia	21	(0)

Managerial career
- 2022–: Cambodia (fitness coach)
- * Club domestic league appearances and goals

Lay Raksmey (born 29 October 1989 in Cambodia) is a football coach and former player. He is the fitness/strength and conditioning coach of the Cambodia national team and Preah Khan Reach Svay Rieng.

He has represented Cambodia at the senior international level.

== Honours ==
Svay Rieng

- Cambodian League: 2013
- Hun Sen Cup: 2011, 2012, 2015
