= Carlos Inarejos =

Spanish football manager (born 1984)

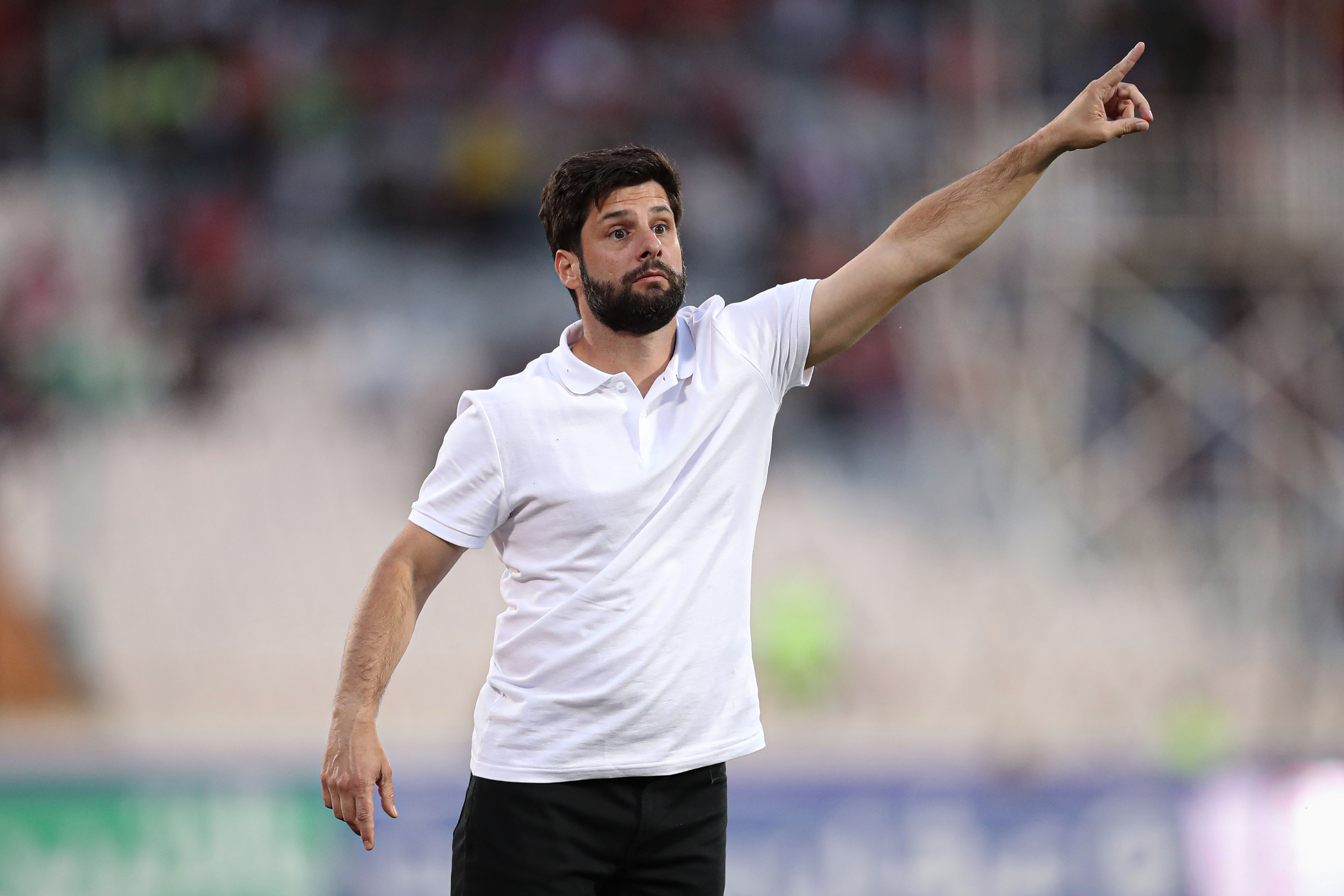

Personal information
- Full name: Carlos Hernandez Inarejos
- Date of birth: 27 May 1984 (age 42)
- Place of birth: Gandia, Spain

Team information
- Current team: Boeung Ket F.C. (head coach)

Managerial career
- Years: Team
- 2011–2013: Alicante (youth)
- 2013: Murcia B (assistant)
- 2014–2015: Artajonés
- 2016–2017: Ermis Aradippou (assistant)
- 2016: Manchester 62
- 2017–2018: Mulhouse
- 2018–2019: Al Hilal (youth)
- 2019–2020: Al Ahli (Doha) (youth)
- 2020: Khor Fakkan (assistant)
- 2020–2021: Al Shabab (youth)
- 2021: Al Shabab
- 2021–2022: Karpaty Halych
- 2022: Al-Arabi
- 2023: Nassaji Mazandaran
- 2023–2024: Noah
- 2024–2025: Al-Riffa
- 2025: Al-Tai

Carlos Hernandez Inarejos (born 27 May 1984) is a Spanish football coach.

== Career ==
After working in Senegal and Zambia, and working as assistant manager for Cypriot side Ermis Aradippou, Inarejos was appointed manager of Manchester 62 in Gibraltar.

On 12 July 2017, he was appointed manager of French fourth division club Mulhouse. He left the club the following year and get fourth position in regular league.

In 2018, he was appointed manager Al Hilal club U17 (Saudi Arabia). He won the league (23W/2D/1D) and got second place in international emirates tournament (Flamengo 2 vs Al Hilal 0). In 1/2 won 4-1 against Atlético de Madrid.

In 2019, he was appointed manager of Al Ahli (Doha) in Qatar. He started in U23 team but after sacked coach first team he played two matches Qatar Emir cup winning both, after that he finished the league with U23 team.

In 2020, Inarejos was appointed assistant manager of Emirati team Khor Fakkan.

On 5 January 2021, he was appointed manager of Al Shabab in Saudi Arabia. He left the club on 31 May 2021 at the end of his contract, being replaced by Péricles Chamusca. In 19 matches he won 12 and get the second place in Saudi Pro League qualifying for Asian Champions League.

On 23 September 2021, Inarejos signed contract with Ukrainian Second League club Karpaty Halych.

On 28 June 2022, Inarejos was appointed as manager of Saudi First Division League club Al-Arabi. He was sacked on 4 October 2022 after just 6 games in charge. 2 won, 4 draw and 0 defeats

On 9 April 2023, Inarejos was appointed as the manager of Iran Persian League Nassaji Mazandaran playing semi-finals cup and to achieving the goal of the club.

27 September is a new coach FC Noah Yerevan (Armenian Premier league) until 31 may 2024. The club was in second place and have got to play Conference League the new season.

On 16 December 2024, Inarejos was appointed as the new head coach of Bahraini club Al-Riffa. On 31 May 2025, at the end of the season, both parties decide not to renew the contract.

On 14 July 2025, Inarejos was appointed as manager of Saudi FDL club Al-Tai. On 6 October 2025, Inarejos resigned from his post as manager after just 5 games in charge by different sportives thinks.

July 2026 Carlos sign a contract with Boeung Ket FC until 31 may 2028.

== Managerial statistics ==
As of match played 7 March 2024

Managerial record by team and tenure
Team	Nat	From	To	Record				
Team	Nat	From	To	P	W	D	L	Win %
Manchester 62	(Gibraltar)	8 February 2017	17 March 2017	4	1	1	2	25.00
Mulhouse	(France)	12 July 2017	31 June 2018	35	19	7	9	54.29
Al-Shabab	(Saudi Arabia)	5 January 2021	31 May 2021	19	12	2	5	63.16
Karpaty Halych	(Ukraine)	23 September 2021	24 February 2022	11	4	3	4	36.36
Al-Arabi	(Saudi Arabia)	28 June 2022	4 October 2022	6	2	4	0	33.33
Nassaji Mazandaran	(Iran)	9 April 2023	29 September 2023	7	1	3	3	14.29
FC Noah	(Armenia)	29 September 2023	30 June 2024	29	22	2	5	75.86
Al-Riffa SC	(Bahrain)	16 December 2024	1 June 2025	23	11	6	6	47.83
Al-Tai	(Saudi Arabia)	14 July 2025	6 October 2025	5	0	2	3	0.00
Total				139	72	29	38	51.80
