= 1987 Cambodian League =

Cambodian League
- Season: 1987

The 1987 Cambodian League season is the 6th season of top-tier football in Cambodia. Statistics of the Cambodian League for the 1987 season.

== Overview ==
Ministry of Health won the championship.
