= 1995 Cambodian League =

Cambodian League
- Season: 1995

The 1995 Cambodian League season is the 14th season of top-tier football in Cambodia. Statistics of the Cambodian League for the 1995 season.

== Overview ==
Civil Aviation won the championship.
