= 2002 Cambodian League =

Cambodian League
- Season: 2002
- Champions: Samart United

The 2002 Cambodian League season is the 20th season of top-tier football in Cambodia. In the 2002 Cambodian League, Samart United won the championship.
