= 1999 Cambodian League =

Cambodian League
- Season: 1999

The 1999 Cambodian League season is the 18th season of top-tier football in Cambodia. Statistics of the Cambodian League for the 1999 season.

== Overview ==
Royal Dolphins won the championship.
