= 1993 Cambodian League =

Cambodian League
- Season: 1993

The 1993 Cambodian League season is the 12th season of top-tier football in Cambodia. Statistics of the Cambodian League for the 1993 season.

== Overview ==
National Defense Ministry won the championship.
