= 1986 Cambodian League =

Cambodian League
- Season: 1986

The 1986 Cambodian League season is the 5th season of top-tier football in Cambodia. Statistics of the Cambodian League for the 1986 season.

== Overview ==
National Defense Ministry won the championship.
