= 1997 Cambodian League =

Cambodian League
- Season: 1997

The 1997 Cambodian League season is the 16th season of top-tier football in Cambodia. Statistics of the Cambodian League for the 1997 season.

== Overview ==
Body Guards Club won the championship.
