= Red Eagle FC =

Cambodian football club

Red Eagle Football Club is an association football club in Cambodia. It played in the Cambodian League the top division of Cambodian football.
