= Franc Paiva =

Brazilian footballer (born 1992)

Personal information
- Full name: Franc Santana Paiva
- Date of birth: 22 August 1992 (age 34)
- Place of birth: Apiaí, Brazil
- Position: Forward

Youth career
- –2011: Corinthians
- 2012-2013: Noroeste

Senior career*
Years	Team	Apps	(Gls)
2013	Pirassununguense		
2014	Santacruzense	9	(0)
2014–2015	Primavera	10	(2)
2016	Portuguesa Santista	4	(1)
2017	Ypiranga-RS	1	(0)
2017	Aparecida EC		
2018	Casa Pia	2	(0)
2018	Moura	5	(3)
2019	Primavera	4	(1)
2019	Devolli	3	(0)
2020	Boeung Ket Angkor		(4)
- * Club domestic league appearances and goals as of 10:36, 25 November 2020 (UTC)

Franc Santana Paiva (born 22 August 1992) is a Brazilian Forward footballer who plays for a Cambodian club Boeung Ket Angkor.

== Career statistics ==
=== Club ===
As of 25 November 2020.

Club	Season	League			State league		Cup		Other		Total	
Club	Season	Division	Apps	Goals	Apps	Goals	Apps	Goals	Apps	Goals	Apps	Goals
Santacruzense	2014	–			9 (Note: Appearances in the Campeonato Paulista A3)	0	0	0	0	0	9	0
Primavera	2015	–			10	2	0	0	0	0	10	2
Portuguesa Santista	2016	–			4 (Note: Appearances in the Campeonato Paulista A2)	1	0	0	0	0	4	1
Ypiranga-RS	2017	Série C	0	0	1 (Note: Appearances in the Campeonato Gaúcho)	0	0	0	0	0	1	0
Casa Pia	2018–19	Campeonato de Portugal	2	0	–		1 (Note: Appearances in the Taça de Portugal)	0	0	0	3	0
Moura	2018–19	Campeonato de Portugal	5	3	–		0	0	0	0	5	3
Primavera	2019	–			4	1	0	0	0	0	4	1
Devolli	2019–20	Kategoria e Parë	3	0	–		1 (Note: Appearances in the Albanian Cup)	0	0	0	4	0
Career total			9	3	28	4	2	0	0	0	39	7
