= 1992 Cambodian League =

Cambodian League
- Season: 1992

The 1992 Cambodian League season is the 11th season of top-tier football in Cambodia. Statistics of the Cambodian League for the 1992 season.

== Overview ==
Municipal Constructions won the championship.
