= Tum Saray =

Cambodian footballer

Tum Saray ទុំ សារ៉ាយ
Personal information
- Date of birth: 10 July 1992 (age 34)
- Place of birth: Phnom Penh, Cambodia
- Height: 1.67 m (5 ft 6 in)
- Position: Midfielder

Youth career
- Preah Khan Reach

Senior career*
| Years | Team | Apps | (Gls) |
| 2010–2014 | Preah Khan Reach | | |
| 2016–2017 | Nagaworld | 13 | (2) |
| 2017–2018 | Electricite du Cambodge | | |

International career
| 2010–2013 | Cambodia | 8 | (0) |

Managerial career
- 2022–2023: Electricite du Cambodge
- 2023–2024: ISI Dangkor Senchey (Youth)
- 2024–: ISI Dangkor Senchey
- 2025–: Cambodia (Assistant)
- * Club domestic league appearances and goals

Tum Saray (born 10 July 1992) is a Cambodian football coach who currently coaching ISI Dangkor Senchey in the Cambodian Premier League and assistant coach of Cambodia.

== Career ==
As a player, Saray played for Preah Khan Reach, Nagaworld, and Electricite du Cambodge in the Cambodian League and the Cambodia national team. He announced his retirement from professional football player in 2018.
