= Om Thavrak =

Cambodian footballer

Personal information
- Full name: Om Thavrak
- Date of birth: 25 June 1985 (age 41)
- Place of birth: Phnom Penh, Cambodia
- Height: 1.78 m (5 ft 10 in)

Senior career*
| Years | Team | Apps | (Gls) |
| 2003–2006 | Khmera Kiela | 41 | (0) |
| 2006–2008 | Phnom Penh Crown | 54 | (2) |
| 2009–2016 | Nagaworld | 317 | (8) |
| 2016–2017 | Cambodian Tiger | 32 | (0) |

International career
| 2006–2013 | Cambodia | 17 | (0) |
- * Club domestic league appearances and goals

Om Thavrak (born 25 June 1985 in Cambodia) is a footballer for Cambodian Tiger FC in the Cambodian League and Cambodia national football team.

== Honours ==
=== Club ===
Phnom Penh Crown

- Cambodian League: 2008
- Hun Sen Cup: 2008

Nagaworld FC

- Cambodian League: 2009
- Hun Sen Cup: 2013
