= Lanexang United F.C. =

Lanexang United
- Full name: Lanexang United Football Club
- Founded: 2014; 12 years ago
- Ground: Lanexang Stadium; Vientiane
- Capacity: 4,000
- Chairman: Phanthachith Inthilath
Home colours	Away colours	Third colours

Lanexang United Football Club (Laos ສະໂມສອນລ້ານຊ້າງຢູໄນເຕັດ) was a Laotian professional football club based in Vientiane, Laos. They were the champions of the 2016 Lao Premier League before withdrawing from the competition. Their home stadium was Lanexang Stadium.

== Former players ==
- (Laos) Khonesavanh Sihavong
- (Laos) Daoneua Siviengxay
- (Laos) Sengdao Inthilath
- (Laos) Vilayout Sayyabounsou
- (Laos) Phoutthasay Khochalern
- (Australia) Aaron Evans
- (Australia) Kaz Patafta
- (Iran) Alireza Jamali
- (Uruguay) Diego Emilio Silva
- (Montenegro) Argzim Redžović

== Continental record ==
Season	Competition	Round	Club	Home	Away	Aggregate
2016	Mekong Club Championship	First round	(Vietnam) SHB Đà Nẵng	2–1		
2016	Mekong Club Championship	First round	(Myanmar) Yadanarbon	3–3		
2016	Mekong Club Championship	Semi-final	(Cambodia) Boeung Ket Angkor	0–3		
2016	Mekong Club Championship	Final	(Thailand) Buriram United	1–0	0–2	Runner-up
2017	AFC Cup	Group H	(Singapore) Home United	Withdrew		
2017	AFC Cup	Group H	(Vietnam) Than Quảng Ninh	Withdrew		

== Honours ==
=== Domestic competitions ===
- Lao Premier League
  - Winners (1): 2016
- Lao Minister Cup
  - Champions (1): 2015

=== International competitions ===
- Mekong Club Championship
  - Runners-up (1): 2016

== Managers ==
Name	Period
(Portugal) Mario Parreira	December 2014
(Portugal) Eduardo Almeida	December 2015
(Serbia) Nikola Kavazović	January 2016
(England) David Booth	January 2016
(Brazil) Leonardo Vitorino	May 2016

== Sponsors ==
Period	Sportswear	Sponsor
2014	(Thailand) KELA	Intra Corporation
2015	(Thailand) Koolsport	Krung Thai Bank
2016	(Thailand) Real United	Petroleum Trading Lao

== Affiliated clubs ==
- (Thailand) Nakhon Phanom
