= Sok Rithy =

Cambodian footballer

Personal information
- Full name: Sok Rithy
- Date of birth: December 30, 1990 (age 35)
- Place of birth: Phnom Penh, Cambodia
- Height: 1.83 m (6 ft 0 in)
- Position: Defender

Senior career*
Years	Team	Apps	(Gls)
2010–2013	Preah Khan Reach		
2013–2016	Nagaworld		
2017	Electricite du Cambodge		

International career
2009–2013	Cambodia U-23		
2008–2015	Cambodia	12	(1)
- * Club domestic league appearances and goals

Sok Rithy (born December 30, 1990, in Cambodia) is a former Cambodian footballer.

== International goals ==
#	Date	Venue	Opponent	Score	Result	Competition
1.	March 25, 2011	Male, Maldives	Kyrgyzstan	3–4	Lose	2012 AFC Challenge Cup qualification
