= Keo Sokngon =

Cambodian footballer

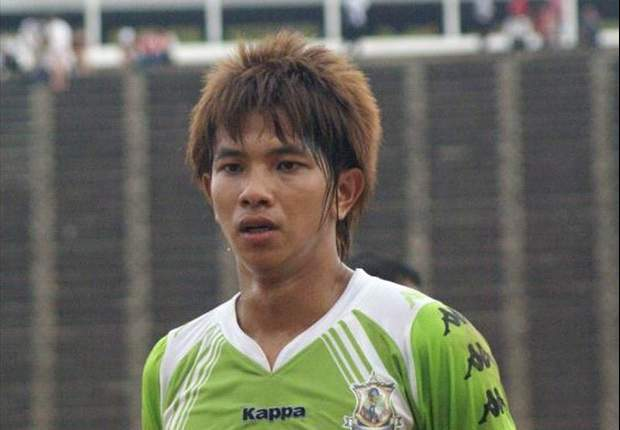

Personal information
- Date of birth: 30 April 1988 (age 38)
- Place of birth: Kratié, People’s Republic of Kampuchea
- Height: 1.72 m (5 ft 8 in)
- Positions: Striker; midfielder

Senior career*
Years	Team	Apps	(Gls)
2007–2010	Phnom Penh Crown	67	(45)
2011–2012	Samut Sakhon	20	(9)
2012–2015	Boeung Ket Angkor		
2015–2017	Phnom Penh Crown	33	(9)

International career
2012	Cambodia U-22	6	(1)
2008–2013	Cambodia U-23	11	(4)
2008–2017	Cambodia	15	(2)

Managerial career
- 2018–: Phnom Penh Crown FC (team manager)
- * Club domestic league appearances and goals

Keo Sokngon (born 30 April 1988) is a retired Cambodian footballer who is currently serving as team manager of Phnom Penh Crown in the Cambodian League. He played as a striker or midfielder for his club and the Cambodia national football team. His younger brother, Keo Sokpheng, is also a footballer.

== Biography ==
Sokngon was born to a Chinese Cambodian father and a Vietnamese mother, who was born in Tây Ninh Province. Keo Sokngon moved to Vietnam to live with his family when he was 3 years old and learnt Vietnamese from his mother.

After returning to Cambodia, Sokngon joined Phnom Penh Crown. As a striker, he scored 12 goals in 2009, significantly contributing to the 2009 Cambodian League championship of Phnom Penh Crown. Soon after, he was called to Cambodia national under-23 football team participate at 2009 Southeast Asian Games Football Tournament. He spent one season with Samut Sakhon in Thailand where he received the best player award of the division. When he came back to Cambodia, he signed a contract with the newcomer of the league, Boeung Ket Angkor (formerly known as Boeung Ket Rubber Field FC) and won the league at that time. On 23 June 2015, he signed with Phnom Penh Crown once again as well as his younger brother, Keo Sokpheng.

After the 2017 Cambodian League season Sokngon was forced to step away from and eventually retire from Football prematurely due to a long-term knee injury. Before the beginning of the 2019 Cambodian League season he was announced as Phnom Penh Crown FC's new team manager along with a number of new coaching staffs including head coach Leonardo Vitorino, assistant coach Sum Vanna, goalkeeping coach Fernando Vitorino and general manager Ly Heang.

=== International goals ===
Scores and results list Cambodia's goal tally first.

No	Date	Venue	Opponent	Score	Result	Competition
1.	28 April 2009	Bangabandhu National Stadium, Dhaka, Bangladesh	Macau	2–0	2–1	2010 AFC Challenge Cup qualification
2.	5 October 2012	Thuwunna Stadium, Yangon, Myanmar	Timor-Leste	1–5	1–5	2012 AFF Championship qualification

== Honours ==
=== Player ===
Phnom Penh Crown

- Cambodian League: 2008, 2010, 2015
- Hun Sen Cup: 2008, 2009

Boeung Ket Rubber Field

- Cambodian League: 2012

Individual

- 2011 Regional League Division 2 Most Valuable Player
- 2012 Cambodian League Most Valuable Player

=== Manager ===
Phnom Penh Crown

- Cambodian League Cup: 2022
- Cambodian Super Cup: 2022
