= 2016 Mekong Club Championship =

Tournament details
- Host country: Laos; Myanmar; Cambodia; Vietnam; Thailand
- Dates: 5 November 2016 - 8 January 2017
- Teams: 5 (from 5 associations)
- Venue: 5 (in 5 host cities)

Final positions
- Champions: (Thailand) Buriram United (2nd titles)
- Runners-up: (Laos) Lanexang United

Tournament statistics
- Matches played: 6
- Goals scored: 19 (3.17 per match)
- Top scorer: (Laos) Soukaphone Vongchiengkham (3 goals)
- Best player: (Laos) Soukthavy Soundala

The 2016 Mekong Club Championship is the 3rd season of the Mekong Club Championship. The championship is sponsored by Toyota and will be played between October 2016 and January 2017 featuring teams from Cambodia, Laos, Myanmar, Thailand and Vietnam.

== Qualified teams ==
| Team | Federation | Qualification | Participation |
Enter in the final
| (Thailand) Buriram United | Thailand | Winners of the 2016 Thai League Cup | 2nd |
Enter in the semi-final
| (Cambodia) Boeung Ket Angkor | Cambodia | Winners of the 2016 Cambodian League | 2nd |
Enter in the first round
| (Vietnam) SHB Đà Nẵng | Vietnam | Third-placed team of the 2016 V.League 1 | 1st |
| (Laos) Lanexang United | Laos | Winners of the 2016 Lao Premier League | 1st |
| (Myanmar) Yadanarbon | Myanmar | Winners of the 2016 Myanmar National League | 1st |

== Venues ==
| (Cambodia) Phnom Penh | (Laos) Vientiane | (Myanmar) Mandalay | (Thailand) Pathum Thani | (Vietnam) Hanoi |
|---|---|---|---|---|
| National Olympic Stadium | Chao Anouvong Stadium | Mandalarthiri Stadium | Thammasat Stadium | Mỹ Đình National Stadium |
| Capacity: 50,000 | Capacity: 15,000 | Capacity: 30,000 | Capacity: 25,000 | Capacity: 40,192 |

== First round ==
- Times listed are local (UTC+7:00) and (UTC+6:30)

Key to colours in group tables
| Group winner qualify for the semi-final round |

| Pos | Team | Pld | W | D | L | GF | GA | GD | Pts | Qualification |
|---|---|---|---|---|---|---|---|---|---|---|
| 1 | (Laos) Lanexang United | 2 | 1 | 1 | 0 | 5 | 4 | +1 | 4 | Semi-final round |
| 2 | (Myanmar) Yadanarbon | 2 | 0 | 2 | 0 | 5 | 5 | 0 | 2 | |
| 3 | (Vietnam) SHB Đà Nẵng | 2 | 0 | 1 | 1 | 3 | 4 | −1 | 1 | |

5 November 2016
18:00 UTC+7:00

| Lanexang United (Laos) | 2–1 | (Vietnam) SHB Đà Nẵng |
|---|---|---|
| Khampheng 54'; Soukaphone 75' | Report | Vũ Phong 15' |

Chao Anouvong Stadium, Vientiane
Attendance: 6,885
Referee: Farhad Bin Mohamed (Singapore)

23 December 2016
18:00 UTC+7:00

| SHB Đà Nẵng (Vietnam) | 2–2 | (Myanmar) Yadanarbon |
|---|---|---|
| David 21'; Merlo 61' | Report | Myo Zaw Oo 45'; Omogba 55' |

Mỹ Đình National Stadium, Hanoi
Referee: Muhammad Taqi Aljaafari (Singapore)

27 December 2016
18:00 UTC+6:30

| Yadanarbon (Myanmar) | 3–3 | (Laos) Lanexang United |
|---|---|---|
| Yan Paing 21'; William 85'; Wada Yuya 90+3' | Report | Manolom 11'; Latsamy 13'; Soukaphone 83' |

Mandalarthiri Stadium, Mandalay
Referee: Alongkorn Feemuechang (Thailand)

== Knockout stage ==
=== Bracket ===
| Semifinal | | Final |
| | | (Laos) Lanexang United | 1 | 0 | 1 |
| (Cambodia) Boeung Ket Angkor | 0 | (Thailand) Buriram United | 0 | 2 | 2 |
| (Laos) Lanexang United | 3 |

=== Semi-final ===
31 December 2016
18:00 UTC+7:00

| Boeung Ket Angkor (Cambodia) | 0–3 | (Laos) Lanexang United |
|---|---|---|
| | Report | Soukaphone 39'; Phoutthasay 45+2'; Keoviengphet 81' |

Olympic Stadium, Phnom Penh
Referee: Nagor Amir Noor Mohamed (Malaysia)

=== Final ===
First Leg

4 January 2017
18:00 UTC+7:00

| Lanexang United (Laos) | 1–0 | (Thailand) Buriram United |
|---|---|---|
| Khampheng 17' | Report |

Chao Anouvong Stadium, Vientiane
Referee: Muhammad Nazmi Nasaruddin (Malaysia)

Second Leg

8 January 2017
19:00 UTC+7:00

| Buriram United (Thailand) | 2–0 | (Laos) Lanexang United |
|---|---|---|
| Diogo 36' (pen.); Seul-ki 49' | Report |

Thammasat Stadium, Pathum Thani
Referee: Muhammad Taqi Aljaafari (Singapore)

Buriram United won 2–1 on aggregate.

== Winners ==
Mekong Club Championship 2016
Winners

Buriram United
Second Title

== Goalscorers ==
| Rank | Player | Team | MD1 | MD2 | SF | F1 | F2 | Total |
|---|---|---|---|---|---|---|---|---|
| 1 | (Laos) Soukaphone Vongchiengkham | (Laos) Lanexang United | 1 | 1 | 1 | | | 3 |
| 2 | (Laos) Khampheng Sayavutthi | (Laos) Lanexang United | 1 | | | 1 | | 2 |
3
| 3 | (Argentina) Ezequiel David Britez | (Vietnam) SHB Đà Nẵng | | 1 | | | | 1 |
| 3 | (Argentina) Sebastián Gastón Merlo | (Vietnam) SHB Đà Nẵng | | 1 | | | | 1 |
| 3 | (Brazil) Diogo Luís Santo | (Thailand) Buriram United | Bye | Bye | Bye | | 1 | 1 |
| 3 | (Cameroon) Biassi Nyakwe William | (Myanmar) Yadanarbon | | 1 | | | | 1 |
| 3 | (Japan) Wada Yuya | (Myanmar) Yadanarbon | | 1 | | | | 1 |
| 3 | (South Korea) Go Seul-ki | (Thailand) Buriram United | Bye | Bye | Bye | | 1 | 1 |
| 3 | (Laos) Keoviengphet Liththideth | (Laos) Lanexang United | | | 1 | | | 1 |
| 3 | (Laos) Latsamy Phachantha | (Laos) Lanexang United | | 1 | | | | 1 |
| 3 | (Laos) Manolom Phomsouvanh | (Laos) Lanexang United | | 1 | | | | 1 |
| 3 | (Laos) Phoutthasay Khochalern | (Laos) Lanexang United | | | 1 | | | 1 |
| 3 | (Myanmar) Myo Zaw Oo | (Myanmar) Yadanarbon | 1 | | | | | 1 |
| 3 | (Myanmar) Yan Paing | (Myanmar) Yadanarbon | 1 | | | | | 1 |
| 3 | (Nigeria) Esoh Paul Omogba | (Myanmar) Yadanarbon | 1 | | | | | 1 |
| 3 | (Vietnam) Nguyễn Vũ Phong | (Vietnam) SHB Đà Nẵng | 1 | | | | | 1 |
