= Justine Uche Prince =

Nigerian footballer

Personal information
- Full name: Justine Uche Eke Prince
- Date of birth: October 26, 1990 (age 36)
- Place of birth: Owerri, Nigeria
- Height: 1.74 m (5 ft 8 1/2 in)
- Position: Striker

Senior career*
Years	Team	Apps	(Gls)
2009	Spark fc	17	(21)
2010	Phnom Penh Crown FC	17	(18)
2011	BBCU F.C.	23	(12)
2012	Chanthaburi F.C.	6	(3)
2012	Krabi F.C.	10	(4)
2013	Udon Thani F.C.	11	(3)
2013	Phitsanulok F.C.	18	(15)
2014	Ubon UMT	26	(21)
2015	Samut Sakhon F.C.	20	(16)
2016	Loei City	5	(2)
- * Club domestic league appearances and goals

Justine Uche Prince is a Nigerian professional footballer who plays for Thai League 2 side Samut Sakhon F.C.

He previously played for BBCU F.C. in Thai Division 1.
