= Cambodian Premier League =

Association football league in Cambodia

- Organising body: Cambodian Football League Company (CFLC)
- Founded: 1982; 44 years ago (as Cambodian League) (Semi-Professional League); 2005; 21 years ago (as Metfone Cambodian League); 2022; 4 years ago (as Cambodian Premier League)
- Country: Cambodia
- Confederation: AFC
- Number of clubs: 11
- Level on pyramid: 1
- Relegation to: Cambodian League 2
- Domestic cups: Hun Sen Cup; Cambodian Super Cup
- League cup: Cambodian League Cup
- International cups: AFC Champions League Two; AFC Challenge League; ASEAN Club Championship
- Current champions: Preah Khan Reach Svay Rieng (5th title) (2025–26)
- Most championships: Phnom Penh Crown (8 titles)
- Top scorer: Chan Vathanaka (143 goals)
- Broadcaster(s): BTV Cambodia
- Website: cpl-cambodia.com
- Current: 2026–27 Cambodian Premier League

The Cambodian Premier League (Khmer: ខេមបូឌានព្រីមៀរលីគ, Lik Kampul Kampuchea [lik kɑmˈpuːl ˌkampuˈciə]) is a top professional football division in Cambodia administered by the Cambodian Football League Company (CFLC). Contested by 11 clubs, it operates on a system of promotion and relegation with Cambodian League 2.

== History ==
=== Origins ===
The first domestic football national championship in Cambodia was first established in 1982 during the People's Republic of Kampuchea years. The competing clubs were primarily based on the Soviet model of official amateur teams formed by ministries, the police, army and other state owned enterprises.

In the 2000s, the Cambodian League or C-League was brought about and was rebranded as the Metfone Cambodian League or Metfone C-League at the start of the 2005 season, courtesy of corporate sponsorship of the league's name. Over the course of the following years, the standard of professionalism would change with clubs being formed and clubs being sponsored by corporate entities. In 2018, it was announced that all clubs participating in the league would be required to have access to their own stadium before the start of the 2019 season. This was an attempt by the Football Federation of Cambodia to help further modernize football in Cambodia. In past seasons, many of the league's clubs have shared the Phnom Penh Olympic Stadium or the Old Stadium. Since its inception as an official professional league in 2005, a total of 36 clubs have competed. 6 clubs have been crowned champions, with Phnom Penh Crown winning the title a record 8 times.

=== Cambodian Premier League ===
In October 2021, Satoshi Saito, the former international marketer for FC Barcelona of La Liga, was announced as the CEO of the Cambodian Football League Company (CFLC) which would take over the Metfone C-League's administrative and financial duties and establish the league as Cambodian Premier League starting with the 2022 season.

==== The Cambodia Classic Match ====
The Cambodia Classic Match is given to the rivalry between Phnom Penh Crown and Boeung Ket. On February 6, 2012, both teams met for the first time.

==== First invincible ====
Boeung Ket won the 2020 league season by head-to-head record against 2019 league season champion, Preah Khan Reach Svay Rieng, despite remaining unbeaten the whole season, setting up a record in the Cambodian League.

== Sponsorship ==
Period	Sponsor	Brand
1982–2004		Cambodian League
2005–2021	Metfone	Metfone Cambodian League or Metfone C-League
2022–present	Metfone	Cambodian Premier League

The Cambodian Premier League does not have a title sponsor; however, it is sponsored by a group of multinational corporations.

The current tournament is sponsored by:

- Molten Corporation
- Metfone
- Krud Beer
- Indomie
- V-Active

== Clubs ==
=== 2025–26 season ===
Locations of the 2025–26 Cambodian Premier League teams

The 2023–24 Cambodian Premier League season has welcomed fresh teams and faces, with Prey Veng and ISI Dangkor Senchey joining the league. These teams met the demanding national club license requirements, joining stalwarts like Phnom Penh Crown and Visakha. Despite being the 2022 Cambodian League 2 champions, Electricite du Cambodge did not join the top tier this season because it did not meet the comprehensive licensing criteria. Prey Veng and ISI Dangkor Senchey have expressed their readiness for the league, with ISI Dangkor Senchey notably announcing seven new signings.

The 2024–25 Cambodian Premier League season welcomed Life and Ministry of Interior to the league. After two seasons in the top flight (2021 & 2023–24) and another two in Cambodian League 2 (2020 & 2022), Prey Veng announced that the club is dissolved ahead of 2024–25 season.

The 2025–26 Cambodian Premier League season marked a big change as Ministry of Interior changed its name to MOI Kompong Dewa due to the new management of the club. The club temporarily choose Visakha Stadium to host their home matches since their newly announced stadium in Sihanoukville is still in construction and expected to be opened in the 2027–28 Cambodian Premier League season. Preah Khan Reach Svay Rieng host their home match this season at Morodok Techo National Stadium as Svay Rieng Stadium is under renovation; they are expected to return to Svay Rieng Stadium in the 2026–27 Cambodian Premier League season.

Club	Location	Stadium	Capacity	Previous season	Last Cambodian Premier League title
Angkor Tiger	Siem Reap Province	Akihiro Kato Stadium	2,000	Cambodian Premier League (6th)	-
Boeung Ket	Phnom Penh	National (Olympic) Stadium	50,000	Cambodian Premier League (4th)	2020
ISI Dangkor Senchey	Phnom Penh	ISI Park	3,000	Cambodian Premier League (7th)	-
Kirivong Sok Sen Chey	Takeo Province	Kirivong Sok Sen Chey Stadium	500	Cambodian Premier League (9th)	-
Life Sihanoukville	Sihanoukville	Life Stadium	3,000	Cambodian Premier League (10th)	
MOI Kompong Dewa	Sihanoukville	Visakha Stadium	15,000	Cambodian Premier League (11th)	-
Nagaworld	Kampong Speu Province	Kampong Speu Stadium	3,000	Cambodian Premier League (5th)	2018
Phnom Penh Crown	Phnom Penh	Phnom Penh Crown Stadium	5,010	Cambodian Premier League (2nd)	2022
Preah Khan Reach Svay Rieng	Svay Rieng Province	Svay Rieng Stadium	4,000	Cambodian Premier League (1st)	2024–25
Royal Cambodian Armed Forces	Phnom Penh	RCAF (Old) Stadium	8,000	Cambodian Premier League (8th)	1993
Visakha	Phnom Penh	Visakha Stadium	15,000	Cambodian Premier League (3rd)	-

== Former clubs ==
Club	Location	Latest year in top flight
Albirex Niigata Phnom Penh	Phnom Penh	2014
Asia Euro United	Phnom Penh	2021
Bati Academy	Takeo Province	2020
Build Bright United	Phnom Penh	2015
CMAC United	Phnom Penh	2017
Electricite du Cambodge	Phnom Penh	2021
Kampong Cham	Kampong Cham Province	2019
Khemara Keila	Phnom Penh	2010
Prey Veng	Prey Veng	2024
Soltilo Angkor	Siem Reap Province	2021
Western Phnom Penh	Phnom Penh	2018

== Championship history ==
=== Cambodian League (1982–2004) ===
- 1982: Ministry of Commerce
- 1983: Ministry of Commerce
- 1984: Ministry of Commerce
- 1985: Ministry of Defense
- 1986: Ministry of Defense
- 1987: Ministry of Health
- 1988: Kampong Cham
- 1989: Ministry of Transports
- 1990: Ministry of Transports
- 1991: Dept. of Municipal Constructions
- 1992: Dept. of Municipal Constructions
- 1993: Ministry of Defense
- 1994: Civil Aviation
- 1995: Civil Aviation
- 1996: Body Guards Club
- 1997: Body Guards Club
- 1998: Royal Dolphins
- 1999: Royal Dolphins
- 2000: National Police Commissary
- 2001: Not held
- 2002: Samart United (Note: Currently known as Phnom Penh Crown.)
- 2003: Not held
- 2004: Naga Corp (Note: Currently known as Nagaworld.)

Season	Champions	Runners-up
Metfone Cambodian League (2005–2021)
2005	Khemera Keila	Hello United (Note: Currently known as Phnom Penh Crown.)
2006	Khemera Keila	Nagacorp
2007	Nagacorp (Note: Currently known as Nagaworld.)	Khemera Keila
2008	Phnom Penh Empire (Note: Currently known as Phnom Penh Crown.)	National Defense
2009	Nagacorp	Khemera Keila
2010	Phnom Penh Crown	Preah Khan Reach
2011	Phnom Penh Crown	Nagacorp
2012	Boeung Ket Rubber Field (Note: Currently known as Boeung Ket.)	Nagacorp
2013	Svay Rieng (Note: Currently known as Preah Khan Reach Svay Rieng.)	Boeung Ket Rubber Field
2014	Phnom Penh Crown	Boeung Ket Rubber Field
2015	Phnom Penh Crown	Phnom Penh Crown
2016	Boeung Ket Angkor (Note: Currently known as Boeung Ket.)	National Defense Ministry
2017	Boeung Ket Angkor	Preah Khan Reach Svay Rieng
2018	Nagaworld	Boeung Ket
2019	Preah Khan Reach Svay Rieng	Visakha
2020	Boeung Ket	Preah Khan Reach Svay Rieng
2021	Phnom Penh Crown	Preah Khan Reach Svay Rieng
Cambodian Premier League (2022–present)
2022	Phnom Penh Crown	Visakha
2023–24	Preah Khan Reach Svay Rieng	Phnom Penh Crown
2024–25	Preah Khan Reach Svay Rieng	Phnom Penh Crown
2025–26	Preah Khan Reach Svay Rieng	Phnom Penh Crown

=== Titles by club ===
Clubs	Champions	Winning season	Runners-up	Runners-up seasons
Phnom Penh Crown	8	2002, 2008, 2010, 2011, 2014, 2015, 2021, 2022	4	2005, 2023–24, 2024–25, 2025–26
Preah Khan Reach Svay Rieng	5	2013, 2019, 2023–24, 2024–25, 2025–26	3	2010, 2020, 2021
Nagaworld	4	2004, 2007, 2009, 2018	4	2006, 2011, 2012, 2015
Boeung Ket	4	2012, 2016, 2017, 2020	3	2013, 2014, 2018
RCAF	3	1985, 1986, 1993	3	2008, 2016, 2017
Khemara Keila (defunct)	2	2005, 2006	2	2007, 2009
MOI Kompong Dewa	1	2000	0	
Visakha	0		2	2019, 2022

Source: rsssf.org

== Awards ==
=== Prize money ===
Champion	50,000 USD
Runner-up	26,000 USD
Third place	18,000 USD
Fourth place	15,500 USD

=== Player of the season ===
Season	Player	Club
2012	(Cambodia) Keo Sokngon	Boeung Ket
2013	(Cambodia) Khoun Laboravy	Svay Rieng
2014	(Cambodia) Chan Vathanaka	Boeung Ket Rubber Field
2015	(Cambodia) Chan Vathanaka (2)	Boeung Ket
2016	(Cambodia) Chan Vathanaka (3)	Boeung Ket
2017	(Cambodia) Chrerng Polroth	National Defense Ministry
2018	(North Korea) Choe Myong-ho	Visakha
2019	(Cameroon) Privat Mbarga	Preah Khan Reach Svay Rieng
2020	(Cambodia) Mat Noron	Boeung Ket
2021	(Cameroon) Privat Mbarga (2)	Preah Khan Reach Svay Rieng
2022	(Canada) Marcus Haber	Preah Khan Reach Svay Rieng
2023–24	(Canada) Marcus Haber (2)	Preah Khan Reach Svay Rieng
2024–25	(Cambodia) Andrés Nieto	Phnom Penh Crown
2025–26	(Ghana) Kwame Peprah	Preah Khan Reach Svay Rieng

=== Top scorer of the season ===
Season	Scorer	Club	Goals
2005	(Cambodia) Hok Sochivorn	Hello United	22
2006	No records found		
2007	No records found		
2008	(Cambodia) Khim Borey	National Defense Ministry	18
2009	(Nigeria) Justine Uche Prince	Spark	21
2010	(Nigeria) Julius Chukwuma Ononiwu	Kirivong	25
2011	(Nigeria) Julius Oiboh	Nagaworld	28
2012	(Nigeria) Friday Nwakuna	Boeung Ket	20
2013	(Cambodia) Khoun Laboravy	Svay Rieng	20
2014	(Nigeria) Dzarma Bata	Svay Rieng	23
2015	(Cambodia) Chan Vathanaka	Boeung Ket	37
2016	(Cambodia) Chan Vathanaka (2)	Boeung Ket	22
2017	(Rwanda) Atuheire Kipson	Nagaworld	28
2018	(Nigeria) George Bisan	Nagaworld	28
2019	(Cameroon) Privat Mbarga	Preah Khan Reach Svay Rieng	36
2020	(Cameroon) Privat Mbarga (2)	Preah Khan Reach Svay Rieng	16
2021	(Brazil) Márcio Marques	Nagaworld	22
2022	(Canada) Marcus Haber	Preah Khan Reach Svay Rieng	25
2023–24	(Canada) Marcus Haber (2)	Preah Khan Reach Svay Rieng	31
2024–25	(Cambodia) Andrés Nieto	Phnom Penh Crown	21
2024–25	(Brazil) Ramon Tanque	Visakha	21
2025–26	(Ghana) Kwame Peprah	Preah Khan Reach Svay Rieng	24

=== Coach of the season ===
Season	Coach	Club
2012	(Cambodia) Prak Vuthy	Boeung Ket Rubber Field
2013	(Cambodia) Sam Vandet	Svay Rieng
2014	(Cambodia) Ung Kanyanith	National Police Commissary
2015	(Cambodia) Prak Sovannara	Boeung Ket
2016	(Cambodia) Tep Longrachana	National Defense Ministry
2017	(Cambodia) Hao Socheat	Boeung Ket
2018	(Cambodia) Meas Channa	Nagaworld
2019	(Republic of Ireland) Conor Nestor	Preah Khan Reach Svay Rieng
2020	(Cambodia) Kim Pheakdey	Boeung Ket
2021	(Ukraine) Oleh Starynskyi	Phnom Penh Crown
2022	(Ukraine) Oleh Starynskyi (2)	Phnom Penh Crown
2023–24	(Spain) Pep Muñoz	Preah Khan Reach Svay Rieng
2024–25	(Spain) Pep Muñoz (2)	Preah Khan Reach Svay Rieng
2025–26	(Republic of Ireland) Matthew McConkey	Preah Khan Reach Svay Rieng

=== Goalkeeper of the season ===
Season	Goalkeeper	Club
2012	(Cambodia) Peng Bunchay	Boeung Ket Rubber Field
2013	(Cambodia) Aim Sovannarath	Svay Rieng
2014	(Cambodia) Sou Yaty	Phnom Penh Crown
2015	(Cambodia) Keo Soksela	Phnom Penh Crown
2016	(Cambodia) Um Sereyroth	National Defense Ministry
2017	(Cambodia) Sou Yaty	Boeung Ket
2018	(Cambodia) Samrith Seiha	Nagaworld
2019	(Cambodia) Aim Sovannarath (2)	Preah Khan Reach Svay Rieng
2020	(Cambodia) Hul Kimhuy	Boeung Ket
2021	(Cambodia) Saveng Samnang	Phnom Penh Crown
2022	(Cambodia) Saveng Samnang (2)	Phnom Penh Crown
2023–24	(Cambodia) Vireak Dara	Preah Khan Reach Svay Rieng
2024–25	(Cambodia) Vireak Dara (2)	Preah Khan Reach Svay Rieng
2025–26	(Cambodia) Vireak Dara (3)	Preah Khan Reach Svay Rieng

=== Team of the Season ===
Season	Goalkeepers	Defenders	Midfielders	Forwards
2025–26	(Cambodia) Koy Salim	(Cambodia) Sareth Krya (Brazil) Mateus Barbosa (Romania) Raul Feher (Japan) Takuto Yasuoka	(Brazil) Patrick Robson (Cambodia) Sin Kakada (Cambodia) Mat Noron	(Japan) Mark Ajay Kurita (Ghana) Kwame Peprah (Japan) Yusuke Minagawa

== Records ==
=== All-time hat-tricks ===
Rank	Country	Player	Hat-tricks
1	(Cameroon)	Privat Mbarga	6
2	(Canada)	Marcus Haber	5
2	(Brazil)	Marcio Marques	5
2	(Cambodia)	Chan Vathanaka	5
5	(Nigeria)	George Bisan	4
6	(South Africa)	Shane Booysen	3
6	(Japan)	Takumu Nishihara	3
6	(Cambodia)	Mat Noron	3
6	(Nigeria)	Timothy Okereke	3

=== All-time clean sheets ===
Rank	Country	Player	Clean sheets
1	(Cambodia)	Sou Yaty	37
1	(Cambodia)	Vireak Dara	37
2	(Cambodia)	Keo Soksela	29
2	(Cambodia)	Um Vichet	29
3	(Cambodia)	Um Sereyroth	24
4	(Cambodia)	Koy Salim	22
5	(Cambodia)	Hul Kimhuy	21

== AFC ranking ==
As of 18 May 2025

Ranking				Member association (L: League, C: Cup, LC: League cup)	Club points								Total	2026–27 competition		
2024–25	2023–24	Mvmt	Region	Member association (L: League, C: Cup, LC: League cup)	2016 (×0.3)	2017 (×0.4)	2018 (×0.5)	2019 (×0.6)	2021 (×0.7)	2022 (×0.8)	2023–24 (×0.9)	2024–25 (×1.0)	Total	ACL Elite	ACL Two	Challenge
20	20	—	W 11	Turkmenistan (L, C)	2.000	4.483	7.583	5.267	3.125	2.640	3.463	7.450	24.211	0	0+1	1+0
21	23	▲ +2	W 12	Kuwait (L, C)	0.000	0.000	0.000	3.433	7.070	4.160	3.165	8.075	21.260	0	0+1	1+0
22	21	▼ –1	W 13	Lebanon (L, C)	6.333	0.833	3.933	6.933	2.670	1.525	4.840	4.500	20.304	0	0	1+0
23	30	▲ +7	E 10	Cambodia (L, C)	0.000	1.683	2.250	1.000	0.000	2.070	5.620	11.000	20.112	0	1+1	0
24	16	▼ –8	W 14	Tajikistan (L, C)	0.333	12.900	4.433	3.000	4.970	2.493	2.230	3.276	20.033	0	0	0+1
25	28	▲ +3	E 11	Indonesia (L, C)	0.000	0.000	4.100	5.045	0.000	3.960	3.560	7.204	18.653	0	0+1	0+1
26	27	▲ +1	W 15	Kyrgyzstan (L)	0.000	1.400	0.150	2.433	0.835	0.565	11.830	4.600	18.378	0	0	0+1
27	25	▼ –2	E 12	Philippines (L, C)	4.667	8.120	5.843	4.782	2.600	0.300	0.600	3.667	16.706	0	0+1	0+1

== See also ==
- Football in Cambodia
