= Khemara Keila FC =

Former Cambodian football club

- Full name: Khemara Keila Football Club
- Nickname: Khemara
- Founded: 1997; 28 years ago
- Dissolved: 2011
- Ground: Olympic Stadium; Phnom Penh, Cambodia
- Capacity: 50,000
- Manager: Lah Salakhan
- Coach: Kim Ty
- League: Metfone C-League
- 2010: 7th
Home colours

Khemara Keila Football Club (Khmer: ខេមរាកីឡា) was a Cambodian football club based in Phnom Penh, Cambodia.

== History ==
The club was established in 1997. The name is derived from Khemara a formal term for Khmer, and keila meaning sports. The club won 2005 and 2006 the Metfone C-League, as well 2007 the Hun Sen Cup. Due to financial problems and the mass exodus of key players, the club withdraw from Hun Sen Cup 2011 and later also from Metfone C-League 2011 and was defunct 2011.

== Honours ==
- Metfone C-League
  - Champions (2): 2005, 2006
- Hun Sen Cup
  - Winners (1): 2007

== Performance in AFC competitions ==
- AFC President's Cup: 2 appearances

2006: Semi-final
2007: Group stage
