= Boeung Ket F.C. =

Association football club

Boeung Ket បឹងកេត
- Full name: Boeung Ket Football Club (ក្លឹបបាល់ទាត់បឹងកេត)
- Nickname: The Blue Dragon
- Short name: BKT
- Founded: 2008; 18 years ago as Boeung Ket Rubber Field
- Ground: Phnom Penh Olympic Stadium
- Capacity: 50,000
- Owner: Puth Thyda
- Head coach: Carlos Inarejos
- League: Cambodian Premier League
- 2025–26: CPL, 4th of 11
Home colours	Away colours	Third colours

Boeung Ket Football Club (Khmer: ក្លឹបបាល់ទាត់បឹងកេត, Klœ̆b Băltoăt Bœ̆ng Két) is a professional football club based in Phnom Penh, Cambodia. The club competes in the Cambodian Premier League, the highest division of Cambodian football.

Boeung Ket is one of Cambodia's most successful football clubs, having won the Cambodian Premier League titles 4 times. The club also finished as league runners-up in 2013, 2014 and 2018. In 2019, Boeung Ket won its first Hun Sen Cup title after defeating Preah Khan Reach Svay Rieng in a penalty shootout.

== History ==
=== Establishment and early years (2008–2011) ===
The club was established in 2008 as Boeung Ket Rubber Field Football Club. Originally based in Kampong Cham province, the club entered Cambodian domestic football with the ambition of competing in the country's top division. During its early years, the team developed into a competitive side and prepared for its first major challenge in the Cambodian League.

=== First league title and continental debut (2012–2015) ===
Boeung Ket made a strong impression in the 2012 Cambodian League season, finishing second in the regular league stage before advancing to the championship play-offs. The club subsequently won its first league title, marking a significant achievement in its early history. In the following seasons, Boeung Ket continued to challenge for the championship, finishing as league runners-up in 2013 and 2014.

In 2013, Boeung Ket also represented Cambodia in the AFC President's Cup, competing against clubs from other Asian countries. Boeung Ket later participated in the 2015 Mekong Club Championship, where it reached the final but lost 1–0 to Thai club Buriram United. In 2015, the club changed its name to Boeung Ket Angkor Football Club.

=== Consecutive championships and AFC Cup participation (2016–2018) ===
Boeung Ket won the Cambodian League title in 2016, returning to the top of Cambodian football. The club retained the championship in 2017, securing consecutive league titles. During this period, it also won the 2017 Cambodian Super Cup and competed in the 2017 AFC Cup, representing Cambodia in continental competition.

In 2018, Boeung Ket finished as runners-up in the Cambodian League. The club also competed in the 2018 AFC Cup, facing Laotian club Lao Toyota, Philippines club Ceres–Negros, Myanmar club Shan United and Singaporean club Home United during its continental campaigns. Although it did not progress to the later stages, its participation provided further experience against clubs from across Southeast Asia.

=== First Hun Sen Cup and fourth league title (2019–2020) ===
In 2018, Boeung Ket relocated from Kampong Cham province to Kandal province before moving to Phnom Penh in 2019. The club won its first Hun Sen Cup in 2019, defeating Preah Khan Reach Svay Rieng in the final on penalties. The victory added a major domestic cup trophy to its honours.

In 2020, Boeung Ket won its fourth Cambodian League championship. The team produced a campaign under head coach Kim Pheakdey, returning to the top of the domestic league for the first time since 2017. The title established Boeung Ket among Cambodia's successful modern clubs.

=== Continued domestic competition (2021–present) ===
Following its 2020 league triumph, Boeung Ket continued to compete in the Cambodian Premier League and domestic cup competitions. The club reached the Hun Sen Cup final in 2022 but finished as runners-up. It remained among the established teams in Cambodian football while facing increased competition from Phnom Penh Crown, Preah Khan Reach Svay Rieng and Visakha.

Boeung Ket continued to compete in the Cambodian Premier League during the 2023–24 and 2024–25 seasons, finishing fourth in both campaigns. In October 2024, the club appointed Irish coach Conor Nestor, who aimed to return the team to contention for the league championship. Despite remaining competitive, Boeung Ket did not win another major trophy during this period.

Boeung Ket competed in the 2025–26 Cambodian Premier League season, finishing fifth in the regular stage to qualify for the championship play-offs. The club recorded notable results during the campaign, including a 2–1 victory over eventual league champions Preah Khan Reach Svay Rieng on 27 December 2025. Boeung Ket continued to pursue a return to the top of Cambodian football while competing against the country's leading clubs.

== Stadium ==
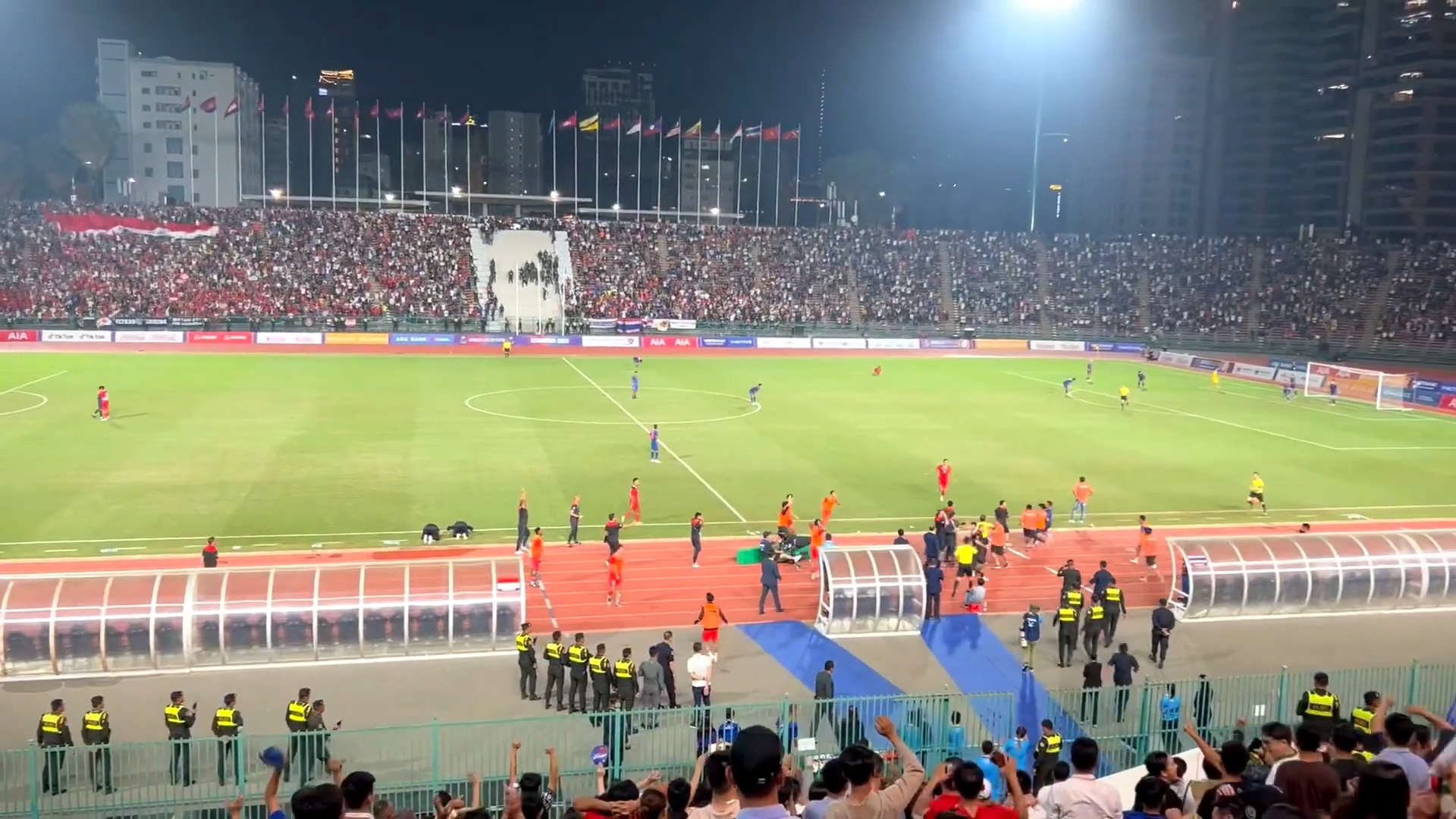
Olympic Stadium

Since 2019, Boeung Ket has played its home matches at the Olympic Stadium. The stadium was designed by the renowned Cambodian architect Vann Molyvann. Before relocating to Phnom Penh, Boeung Ket used several home grounds. While based in Kampong Cham Province, the club played home matches at provincial venues, before temporarily using the Cambodia Airways Stadium during the 2022 season.

== Affiliated clubs ==
- (Japan) Shonan Bellmare (2022–present)

== Players ==
=== Current squad ===
As of October 2026

Note: Flags indicate national team as defined under FIFA eligibility rules; some limited exceptions apply. Players may hold more than one non-FIFA nationality.

No.	Pos.	Nation	Player
1	GK	CAM	Koy Salim
2	DF	CAM	Sleh Sen
4	DF	PHI	Scott Woods
5	DF	CAM	Chhoeung Visinu
6	DF	CAM	Soueth Nava
7	FW	CAM	Iago Bento
8	MF	CAM	Chea Vesley
10	FW	CAM	Mat Noron (Vice-captain)
11	FW	CAM	Chan Vathanaka (Captain)
13	MF	AUS	Louis Zabala
14	DF	CAM	Our Phearon
17	FW	CAM	Eav Sovannara
18	MF	POR	Sergio Silva
19	FW	GBS	Romário Baldé

No.	Pos.	Nation	Player
20	DF	CAM	Vang Davin
23	DF	CAM	Taing Bunchhai
24	FW	AUS	Cyrus Dehmie
27	MF	CAM	Aarun Lim
31	DF	SCO	Sean Kelly
33	GK	CAM	Kem Kuntheara
47	DF	CAM	Try Sinarin
69	FW	CAM	Salath Menghour
77	DF	CAM	Yeu Muslim
79	FW	CAM	Khoan Soben
88	MF	CAM	Nop David
98	FW	CAM	Voeun Va
99	FW	NZL	Myer Bevan

=== Out on loan ===
Note: Flags indicate national team as defined under FIFA eligibility rules; some limited exceptions apply. Players may hold more than one non-FIFA nationality.

No.	Pos.	Nation	Player
19	DF	CAM	Touch Manoch (to (Cambodia) Kirivong Sok Sen Chey)

=== Players with multiple nationalities ===
- (Brazil) (Cambodia) Iago Bento
- (New Zealand) (Cambodia) Aarun Lim
- (Ivory Coast) (Australia) Cyrus Dehmie
- (New Zealand) (Canada) Myer Bevan
- (Guinea-Bissau) (Portugal) Romário Baldé
- (Portugal) (Angola) Sergio Silva
- (Philippines) (Norway) Scott Woods

== Management and staff ==
As of July 2026

Position	Staff
Team manager	(Cambodia) Hong Pheng
Secretary	(Cambodia) Sabone Venta
Head coach	(Spain) Carlos Inarejos
Assistant coach	(Cambodia) Hao Socheat
Goalkeeper coach	(Timor-Leste) Juliao Monteiro
Fitness coach	(Colombia) Gonazalez Acevedo Cristian Mateo
Physiotherapist	(Japan) Tomoya Ueta
Sport Scientist	(Malaysia) Joseph D'Angelus

== Honours ==
Type	Honours	Titles	Seasons
League	Cambodian Premier League	4	2012, 2016, 2017, 2020
Cup	Hun Sen Cup	1	2019
Cup	Cambodian Super Cup	1	2017

Bold is for those competition that are currently active.

== Award winners ==
=== Domestic ===
- Player of the Season
  - (Cambodia) Keo Sokngon (2012)
  - (Cambodia) Chan Vathanaka (2014, 2015, 2016)
  - (Cambodia) Mat Noron (2020)
- Top Scorer
  - (Nigeria) Friday Nwakuna (2012)
  - (Cambodia) Chan Vathanaka (2015, 2016)
- Coach of the Season
  - (Cambodia) Prak Vuthy (2012)
  - (Cambodia) Prak Sovannara (2015)
  - (Cambodia) Hao Socheat (2017)
  - (Cambodia) Kim Pheakdey (2020)
- Goalkeeper of the Season
  - (Cambodia) Peng Bunchay (2012)
  - (Cambodia) Sou Yaty (2017)
  - (Cambodia) Hul Kimhuy (2020)
- Team of the Season
  - (Cambodia) Koy Salim (2025–26)
  - (Cambodia) Mat Noron (2025–26)

== Notable players ==
=== International capped players ===
AFC/OFC.: (Afghanistan) Mustafa Zazai; (Philippines) Scott Woods	CAF.: (Guinea-Bissau) Romário Baldé	UEFA.: (Scotland) Sean Kelly	CONMEBOL/ CONCACAF.: –NIL–

== Managerial history ==
Coaches by years

Name	Period	Achievements
(Cambodia) Prak Vuthy	2012–2014	2012 Cambodian League champion
(Australia) John McGlynn	2014–2015	
(Cambodia) Prak Sovannara	2015–2017	– 2016 Cambodian League
(Australia) John McGlynn (2)	2017	
(Cambodia) Hao Socheat	2017–2019	– 2017 Cambodian League – 2019 Hun Sen Cup
(Thailand) Apisit Im Amphai	2020	
(Cambodia) Kim Pheakdey	2020–2022	– 2020 Cambodian League
(Cambodia) Hao Socheat (2)	2022–2023	
(Singapore) Clement Teo	2023	
(Cambodia) Hong Pheng (interim)	2023–2024	
(Republic of Ireland) Conor Nestor	2024–2026	
(Spain) Carlos Inarejos	2026–present	

== Club captains ==
Captain by years

Years	Captain
2015–2018	(Cambodia) Khoun Laboravy
2019–2020	(Cambodia) Hong Pheng
2021–2023	(Cambodia) Chan Vathanaka
2024–present	(Cambodia) Mat Noron

== Continental record ==
Season	Tournament	Round	Club	Home	Away	Aggregate
2013	AFC President's Cup	Group C	Sri Lanka Army	6–0		3rd
2013	AFC President's Cup	Group C	(Turkmenistan) Balkan	2–0		3rd
2013	AFC President's Cup	Group C	(Palestine) Hilal Al-Quds	0–1		3rd
2015	Mekong Club Championship	First round	(Laos) Lao Toyota	0–2		
2015	Mekong Club Championship	First round	(Myanmar) Yangon United	3–0		
2015	Mekong Club Championship	Semi-final	(Vietnam) Becamex Binh Duong	2–3		
2015	Mekong Club Championship	Final	(Thailand) Buriram United	1–0		Runners-up
2016	Mekong Club Championship	Semi-final	(Laos) Lanexang United	0–3		
2017	AFC Cup	Qualifying play-off round	(Laos) Lao Toyota	1–1	0–1	2–1
2017	AFC Cup	Group F	(Malaysia) Johor Darul Ta'zim	0–3	3–0	3rd
2017	AFC Cup	Group F	(Philippines) Global	0–2	3–1	3rd
2017	AFC Cup	Group F	(Myanmar) Magwe	1–0	1–1	3rd
2017	Mekong Club Championship	First round	(Vietnam) Sanna Khánh Hòa	1–5	4–4	5–9
2018	AFC Cup	Qualifying play-off round	(Laos) Lao Toyota	3–3	0–1	3–4
2018	AFC Cup	Group G	(Philippines) Ceres-Negros	0–4	9–0	3rd
2018	AFC Cup	Group G	(Myanmar) Shan United	1–2	1–4	3rd
2018	AFC Cup	Group G	(Singapore) Home United	3–2	6–0	3rd
2021	AFC Cup	Group G	Cancelled			

=== Invitational ===
Season	Competition	Round	Club	Home	Away	Aggregate
2013	Singapore Cup	Preliminary round	(Singapore) Tanjong Pagar United	4–1		
2017	Singapore Cup	Preliminary round	(Singapore) Warriors	1–4		
2017	Singapore Cup	Quarter-final	(Philippines) Global Cebu	2–1	1–3	3–4
