= 2026–27 Cambodian Premier League =

Cambodian Premier League
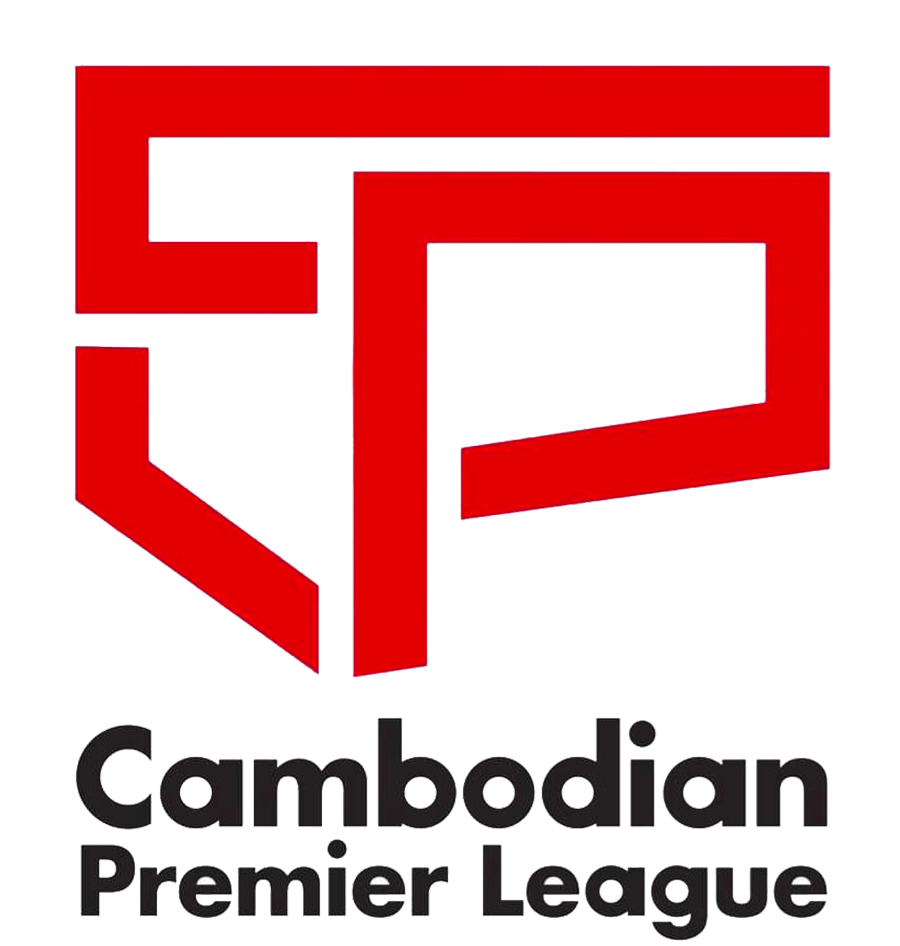
- Season: 2026–27
- Dates: 5 September 2026 – 17 May 2026
- Matches: 25
- Goals: 88 (3.52 per match)
- Top goalscorer: Manny Aguek (6 goals)
- Biggest home win: ISI Dangkor Sen Chey 6-0 Kirivong Sok Sen Chey (12 September 2026) Angkor Tiger 6-0 Royal Cambodian Armed Forces (18 October 2026)
- Biggest away win: Royal Cambodian Armed Forces 1-6 Visakha (06 September 2026)
- Highest scoring: Royal Cambodian Armed Forces 1-6 Visakha (06 September 2026)
- Highest attendance: 7,694; Preah Khan Reach Svay Rieng Vs Visakha (24 October 2026)
- Lowest attendance: 221; Kirivong Sok Sen Chey Vs LIFE FC Sihanoukville (25 October 2026)
- Total attendance: 49,711
- Average attendance: 1,988.44
- All statistics correct as of 5 September.

The 2026–27 Cambodian Premier League is the 42nd season of the Cambodian Premier League, the top Cambodian professional league for association football clubs, since its establishment in 1982. The season began on 5 September and will conclude on 17 May 2026.

Much like the previous season, eleven teams are competing in a double round-robin match before the top-six teams proceed to the champion round.

Preah Khan Reach Svay Rieng are three-time defending champions.

== Teams ==
Locations of the 2025–26 Cambodian Premier League teams

A total of 11 teams are participating in the 2026–27 edition of the Cambodian Premier League.

Team	Location	Stadium	Capacity	Previous season
Angkor Tiger	Siem Reap Province	Akihiro Kato Stadium	3,700	Cambodian Premier League (3rd)
Boeung Ket	Phnom Penh	National (Olympic) Stadium	35,000	Cambodian Premier League (4th)
ISI Dangkor Senchey	Phnom Penh	Smart Stadium	2,980	Cambodian Premier League (11th)
Kirivong Sok Sen Chey	Takéo Province	Kirivong Sok Sen Chey Stadium	250	Cambodian Premier League (8th)
Life Sihanoukville	Sihanoukville	Life Stadium	2,200	Cambodian Premier League (10th)
MOI Kompong Dewa	Sihanoukville	Visakha Stadium	6,835	Cambodian Premier League (6th)
Nagaworld	Kampong Speu Province	Kampong Speu Stadium	2,350	Cambodian Premier League (5th)
Phnom Penh Crown	Phnom Penh	Phnom Penh Crown Stadium	4,712	Cambodian Premier League (2nd)
Preah Khan Reach Svay Rieng	Svay Rieng Province	Svay Rieng Stadium	7,002	Cambodian Premier League (1st)
Royal Cambodian Armed Forces	Phnom Penh	RCAF (Old) Stadium	7,500	Cambodian Premier League (9th)
Visakha	Phnom Penh	Visakha Stadium	6,835	Cambodian Premier League (7th)

=== Personnel and kits ===
Team	Head coach	Captain	Kit manufacturer	Kit sponsors	
Team	Head coach	Captain	Kit manufacturer	Main	Other(s)
Angkor Tiger	(Japan) Sotaro Yasunaga	(Japan) Takuto Yasuoka	(Cambodia) NT Sport	FAFA855 Aqua Water	List: Front: MURE Beppu, nous, iStandard Inc., Kii Co. Ltd; Back: For A-Career, TVS, Resort Worx; Sleeves: Pocari Sweat, Koua, RenoLIVING; Shorts: NAC Group
Boeung Ket	(Spain) Carlos Inarejos	(Cambodia) Mat Noron	(Cambodia) Kouprey	K9Win Investment	List: Front: Dragon Beer, Pocari Sweat, KESS Innovation; Back: Hertz; Sleeves: NTC; Shorts: None
ISI Dangkor Senchey	(Republic of Ireland) Conor Nestor	(Cambodia) Thierry Bin	(Cambodia) NT Sport	ISI Group	List: Front: CPBank, GCM, Smart Axiata; Back: Jotun; Sleeves: None; Shorts: None
Kirivong Sok Sen Chey	(England) Alistair Heath	(United States) Jonny Campbell	(Cambodia) NT Sport	Krud	List: Front: Maline, TK Avenue, U-Pay; Back: Soma Group, V-ACTIVE; Sleeves: Richardsons Group, Mee Chiet; Shorts: None
Life Sihanoukville	(Brazil) Arthur Ferreira	(Japan) Kanta Asami	(Cambodia) NT Sport	Life University	List: Front: SHV; Back: Life School, Life International School; Sleeves: Xihu Resort Hotel; Shorts: None
MOI Kompong Dewa	(Spain) Alex Dorado	(Brazil) Dida	(Cambodia) Forward Sportswear	Kompong Dewa Resort	List: Front: Arjuna Solitaire; Back: Khayangan Beach Club; Sleeves: Nirvana Executive Club; Shorts: None
Nagaworld	(Cambodia) Khim Borey	(Cambodia) Sos Suhana	(Japan) Yonex	NagaWorld	List: Front: None; Back: None; Sleeves: None; Shorts: None
Phnom Penh Crown	(Ukraine) Oleg Starynskyi	(Cambodia) Orn Chanpolin	(Cambodia) Fan Sport	FAFA178 Media	List: Front: None; Back: None; Sleeves: None; Shorts: None
Preah Khan Reach Svay Rieng	(Republic of Ireland) Mattew McConkey	(Cambodia) Soeuy Visal	(Spain) Kelme	Orkide Villa	List: Front: LAX, Simple Cambodia, Krud, Legend Cinemas; Back: Hanuman Beverages, moonmedia; Sleeves: V-ACTIVE; Shorts: None
Royal Cambodian Armed Forces	(Cambodia) Phea Sopheaktra	(Japan) Tetsuaki Misawa	(Cambodia) Dai Ek Sport	None	List: Front: None; Back: None; Sleeves: None; Shorts: None
Visakha	(England) Warren Moon	(Cambodia) Sin Kakada	(Cambodia) Forward Sportswear	BS Transportation and Trading	List: Front: None; Back: None; Sleeves: Jin Bei Group, Visakha Foundation; Shorts: None

=== Managerial changes ===
Team	Outgoing	Manner	Exit date		Position in table	Incoming	Incoming date		Ref.
Team	Outgoing	Manner	Announced on	Departed on	Position in table	Incoming	Announced on	Arrived on	Ref.
Visakha	(England) Scott Cooper	Appointed as Sporting Director	11 November 2026		1st	(England) Warren Moon	11 November 2026		

== Foreign players ==
The number of foreign players registered is 7 per team exclude naturalized player without any restriction to any confederation or region. A team can use 5 foreign players and 1 naturalized player on the field in each game.

Players name in bold indicates the player is registered during the mid-season transfer window.

Club	Player 1	Player 2	Player 3	Player 4	Player 5	Player 6	Player 7	Naturalized player	Unregistered player(s)	Former player(s)
Angkor Tiger	(Spain) Arnau Riera	(Germany) Stephan Mensah	(Japan) Mikhael Akatsuka	(Japan) Takuto Yasuoka	(Netherlands) Ruben Hoogenhout	(Serbia) lrfan Zulfic	(South Sudan) Manny Aguek			
Boeung Ket	(Australia) Cyrus Dehmie	(Australia) Louis Zabala	(Guinea-Bissau) Romário Baldé	(Philippines) Scott Woods	(Portugal) Sergio Silva	(Scotland) Sean Kelly	(New Zealand) Myer Bevan	(Cambodia) (Brazil) Iago Bento		
ISI Dangkor Senchey	(Brazil) Matheus Freitas	(Japan) Takahiro Tezuka	(Japan) Daizo Horikoshi	(Japan) Shintaro Shimizu	(Guinea) Lancine Diakite	(South Africa) Kan Mo	(Cameroon) Privat Mbarga	(Cambodia) (Japan) Yudai Ogawa		
Kirivong Sok Sen Chey	(Wales) Adam Przybek	(Cameroon) Louis Willy Ndongo	(United States) Jonny Campbell	(Croatia) Jacob Tarasenko	(Switzerland) Sinclair Baddy Dega	(England) Louis Hall		(Cambodia) (Japan) Hikaru Mizuno		
Life Sihanoukville	(Brazil) João Manoel	(Brazil) Cleberson Victor	(Serbia) Nemanja Krusevac	(Brazil) André Ferreira	(Brazil) Lucas Serra	(Japan) Kanta Asami	(Brazil) Bruno Ernandes			
MOI Kompong Dewa	(Japan) Takara Masutani	(South Korea) Kim Hyeon-su	(Brazil) Dida	(Brazil) Pedro Henrique	(Brazil) Maurício Barbosa	(Brazil) Charleston Silva		(Cambodia) (Uzbekistan) Alisher Mirzaev		
Nagaworld	(Brazil) Bernardo Diniz	(Brazil) Filipe Vasconcelos	(Brazil) Kibe	(Brazil) Lucas Venuto	(Brazil) Matheus Mega	(Brazil) Rafael Klein	(Japan) Sonosuke Onda			
Phnom Penh Crown	(Australia) Callum Timmins	(Czech Republic) Daniel Bares	(Netherlands) Guytho Mijland	(Netherlands) Rick Ketting	(New Zealand) Moses Dyer	(Romania) Raul Feher	(Ukraine) Valeriy Hryshyn	(Cambodia) (Ivory Coast) Zogbe Vireak	(Japan) Riku Matsuda^{1} (Italy) Amir Luca Tropeano^{1}	
Preah Khan Reach Svay Rieng	(Scotland) Connor Shields	(Brazil) Martins Júnior	(Ghana) Kwame Peprah	(Morocco) Faris Hammouti	(Japan) Takashi Odawara	(Portugal) Rui Pires	(Portugal) Tiago Alves	(Cambodia) (Japan) Takaki Ose	(Brazil) Breno Caetano^{2} (Austria) Johannes Tartarotti^{2} (Brazil) Mateus Barbosa^{2} (Netherlands) Silvester van der Water^{2} (Japan) Ryo Fujii^{2} (Nigeria) Ofufu Ibeh^{2}	
Royal Cambodian Armed Forces	(Japan) Naoki Takasu	(Japan) Tetsuaki Misawa	(Portugal) Josemar Agostinho	(Sierra Leone) Umaru Samura	(United States) Srey Schylar No	(Ivory Coast) Moussa Bakayoko				
Visakha	(Bolivia) Jaume Cuéllar	(Brazil) Cristian Roque	(Brazil) Lucas Ambiel	(Brazil) Eduardo Thuram	(Cameroon) Donovan Ewolo	(The Gambia) Ousman Gai	(Netherlands) Sherwin Seedorf	(Cambodia) (Colombia) Andrés Nieto		

Notes:

^1 Registered to play for the 2026-27 AFC Champions League Two only.
^2 Registered to play for the 2026-27 AFC Champions League Two and 2026–27 ASEAN Club Championship only.

=== Foreign players by confederation ===
Foreign players by confederation
AFC	Australia (3), Japan (11), Philippines (1), South Korea (1)
CAF	Cameroon (3), Gambia (1), Ghana (1), Guinea (1), Guinea-Bissau (1), Ivory Coast (1), Morocco (1), Sierra Leone (1), South Africa (1), South Sudan (1)
CONCACAF	United States (1)
CONMEBOL	Bolivia (1), Brazil (20)
OFC	New Zealand (2)
UEFA	Croatia (3), Czech Republic (1),Germany (1), Netherlands (4), Portugal (4), Romania (1), Scotland (2), Serbia (2), Spain (1), Switzerland (1), Ukraine (1), Wales (1)

=== Players holding Cambodian citizenship ===
Only one naturalized Cambodian player can be registered as a Naturalized Player. Any additional naturalized Cambodian players must be registered as Foreign Players.

- Player names in regular text indicate Cambodian heritage players.
- **Bold** player names indicate naturalized Cambodian players registered as Naturalized Players.
- Italicized player names indicate naturalized Cambodian players registered as Foreign Players.

Club	Player 1	Player 2	Player 3	Player 4	Player 5
Angkor Tiger					
Boeung Ket	(New Zealand) Aarun Lim	(Brazil) **Iago Bento**			
ISI Dangkor Senchey	(France) Thierry Bin	(Japan) **Yudai Ogawa**	(South Africa) Kan Mo	(Cameroon) Privat Mbarga	
Kirivong Sok Sen Chey	(France) Kouch Dani	(Vietnam) Chou Hav	(Japan) **Hikaru Mizuno**		
Life Sihanoukville	(France) David Malis				
MOI Kompong Dewa	(United States) Sitha Mathew	(Uzbekistan) **Alisher Mirzaev**			
Nagaworld	(France) Lucas Arthur	(Sweden) (Burundi) Mohammath Hamisi			
Phnom Penh Crown	(Japan) Sakakibara Rintaro				
Preah Khan Reach Svay Rieng	(Japan) **Takaki Ose**				
Royal Cambodian Armed Forces	(New Zealand) Ashnarvy Mustapha	(Vietnam) (United States) Srey Schylar No	(Vietnam) Dav Nim		
Visakha	(Ghana) Leng Nora	(Colombia) **Andrés Nieto**			

== League table ==
=== Regular season ===
Pos	Team	Pld	W	D	L	GF	GA	GD	Pts	
1	Visakha	7	5	1	1	19	9	+10	16	Qualified to Championship round
2	Preah Khan Reach Svay Rieng	6	4	2	0	17	5	+12	14	Qualified to Championship round
3	Nagaworld	7	4	2	1	13	10	+3	14	Qualified to Championship round
4	Angkor Tiger	7	3	2	2	13	6	+7	11	Qualified to Championship round
5	MOI Kompong Dewa	6	3	1	2	5	4	+1	10	Qualified to Championship round
6	Life Sihanoukville	6	2	2	2	9	7	+2	8	Qualified to Championship round
7	Boeung Ket	6	2	1	3	8	12	−4	7	
8	ISI Dangkor Senchey	6	1	3	2	12	10	+2	6	
9	Phnom Penh Crown	6	1	3	2	8	9	−1	6	
10	Kirivong Sok Sen Chey	7	1	1	5	7	18	−11	4	
11	Royal Cambodian Armed Forces	6	0	0	6	6	27	−21	0	

Updated to match(es) played on 1 November 2026. Source: Cambodian Premier League Khmer Times
Rules for classification: 1) Points; 2) Head-to-head; 3) Goal difference; 4) Goals scored; 5) Disciplinary points.

== Results ==
Home \ Away	AKT	BKF	ISI	KSC	SHV	MKD	NGW	PPC	PKR	RCA	VSK
Angkor Tiger	—	0–1				0–0		2–2		6–0	3–1
Boeung Ket		—					0–2				1–2
ISI Dangkor Senchey	0–1	3–3	—	6–0	2–2				1–1		0–3
Kirivong Sok Sen Chey	2–1			—	1–2	1–2			0–3		2–3
Life Sihanoukville					—						
MOI Kompong Dewa					2–0	—					0–2
Nagaworld				1–1	1–0	1–0	—				
Phnom Penh Crown		1–2			1–1	0–1	2–2	—			
Preah Khan Reach Svay Rieng		4–1					3–1		—	4–0	2–2
Royal Cambodian Armed Forces					0–4		4–5	1–2		—	1–6
Visakha											—

Updated to match(es) played on 1 November 2026. Source: Cambodian Premier League Khmer Times
Legend: Blue = home team win; Yellow = draw; Red = away team win.

== Season statistics ==
=== Top scorers ===
As of 9 November 2026

Rank	Player	Club	Goals
1	(South Sudan) Manny Aguek	Angkor Tiger	8
2	(Cameroon) Donovan Ewolo	Visakha	5
2	(Brazil) Bruno Ernandes	Life Sihanoukville	5
2	(Ghana) Kwame Peprah	PKR Svay Rieng	5
5	(Portugal) Josemar Agostinho	Royal Cambodian Armed Forces	4
5	(Cambodia) Sieng Chanthea	PKR Svay Rieng	4
5	(Brazil) Kibe	Nagaworld	4
8	(Cambodia) Andrés Nieto	Visakha	3
8	(The Gambia) Ousman Gai	Visakha	3
8	(England) Louis Hall	Kirivong Sok Sen Chey	3
8	(Brazil) Filipe Vasconcelos	Nagaworld	3
8	(Brazil) Bernardo Diniz	Nagaworld	3
8	(Guinea) Lancine Diakite	ISI Dangkor Senchey	3

==== Hat-tricks ====
Player	For	Against	Result	Date
(Portugal) Josemar Agostinho	Royal Cambodian Armed Forces	Nagaworld	4–5 (H)	19 September 2026
(South Sudan) Manny Aguek	Angkor Tiger	Royal Cambodian Armed Forces	6–0 (H)	18 October 2026

Note: ^{4} – player who scored 4 goals

=== Top assists ===
Rank	Player	Club	Goals
1	(Bolivia) Jaume Cuéllar	Visakha	4
2	(Netherlands) Sherwin Seedorf	Visakha	3
3	(Brazil) Martins Júnior	PKR Svay Rieng	2
3	(Brazil) Kibe	Nagaworld	2
3	(Serbia) Irfan Zulfic	Angkor Tiger	2
3	(Cameroon) Donovan Ewolo	Visakha	2

=== Clean sheets ===
As of 3 November 2026

Rank	Player	Club	Clean sheets
1	(Spain) Arnau Riera	Angkor Tiger	3
1	(Brazil) Dida	MOI Kompong Dewa	3
3	(Cambodia) Vireak Dara	PKR Svay Rieng	2
3	(Cambodia) Reth Lyheng	Nagaworld	2
3	(Cambodia) Keo Soksela	Visakha	2
6	(Cambodia) Hul Kimhuy	ISI Dangkor Senchey	1
6	(Cambodia) Sambath Samnang	Nagaworld	1
6	(Cambodia) Koy Salim	Boeung Ket	1
6	(Brazil) João Manoel	Life Sihanoukville	1

== See also ==
- 2026–27 Cambodian League 2
- 2026–27 Hun Sen Cup
- 2026 Cambodian Super Cup
