= 2025–26 Cambodian Premier League =

Cambodian Premier League
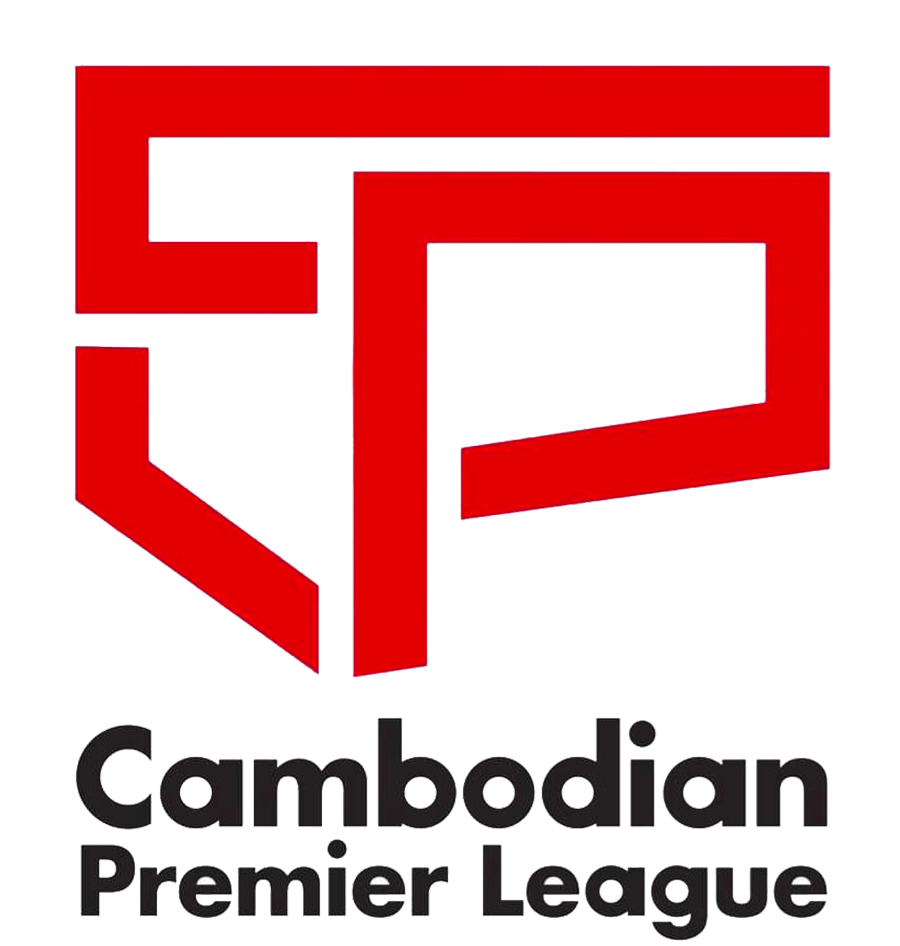
- Season: 2025–26
- Dates: 9 August 2025 – 17 May 2026
- Champions: PKR Svay Rieng (5th title)
- Champions League Two: PKR Svay Rieng; Phnom Penh Crown
- ASEAN Club Championship: PKR Svay Rieng
- Matches: 83
- Goals: 276 (3.33 per match)
- Top goalscorer: Kwame Peprah (24 goals)
- Biggest home win: Angkor Tiger 8–0 ISI Dangkor Senchey (13 September 2025)
- Biggest away win: Royal Cambodian Armed Forces 0–6 Boeung Ket (4 January 2026)
- Highest scoring: MOI Kompong Dewa 3–6 Angkor Tiger (10 August 2025)
- Longest winning run: 5 matches each Phnom Penh Crown; Preah Khan Reach Svay Rieng
- Longest unbeaten run: 13 matches Phnom Penh Crown
- Longest winless run: 8 matches ISI Dangkor Senchey; Life Sihanoukville
- Longest losing run: 7 matches ISI Dangkor Senchey; Life Sihanoukville
- Highest attendance: 20,005; Boeung Ket 2–1 Preah Khan Reach Svay Rieng (27 December 2025)
- Lowest attendance: 160; Kirivong Sok Sen Chey 2–1 Life Sihanoukville (2 November 2025)
- Total attendance: 209,117
- Average attendance: 1,315
- All statistics correct as of 13 April 2026.

The 2025–26 Cambodian Premier League is the 41st season of the Cambodian Premier League, the top Cambodian professional league for association football clubs, since its establishment in 1982. The season began on 9 August 2025 and will conclude on 17 May 2026.

Much like the previous season, eleven teams are competing in a double round-robin match before the top-six teams proceed to the champion round. Due to the cancellation of 2024–25 Cambodian League 2, no team were promoted or relegated.

Preah Khan Reach Svay Rieng are two-time defending champions.

== Teams ==
Locations of the 2025–26 Cambodian Premier League teams

A total of 11 teams are participating in the 2025–26 edition of the Cambodian Premier League.

=== Team changes ===
Since the 2024–25 edition of the Cambodian League 2 was not held, no teams were promoted or relegated. Ministry of Interior FA found themselves under new management and have yet again changed their name to MOI Kompong Dewa, after switching from the National Police the previous season.

Team	Location	Stadium	Capacity	Previous season
Angkor Tiger	Siem Reap Province	Akihiro Kato Stadium	2,000	Cambodian Premier League (6th)
Boeung Ket	Phnom Penh	National (Olympic) Stadium	30,000	Cambodian Premier League (4th)
ISI Dangkor Senchey	Phnom Penh	ISI Park	3,000	Cambodian Premier League (7th)
Kirivong Sok Sen Chey	Takéo Province	Kirivong Sok Sen Chey Stadium	400	Cambodian Premier League (9th)
Life Sihanoukville	Sihanoukville	Life Stadium	2,200	Cambodian Premier League (10th)
MOI Kompong Dewa	Sihanoukville	Visakha Stadium	6,835	Cambodian Premier League (11th)
Nagaworld	Kampong Speu Province	Kampong Speu Stadium	2,400	Cambodian Premier League (5th)
Phnom Penh Crown	Phnom Penh	Phnom Penh Crown Stadium	5,400	Cambodian Premier League (2nd)
Preah Khan Reach Svay Rieng	Svay Rieng Province	Morodok Techo National Stadium	60,000	Cambodian Premier League (1st)
Royal Cambodian Armed Forces	Phnom Penh	RCAF (Old) Stadium	1,030	Cambodian Premier League (8th)
Visakha	Phnom Penh	Visakha Stadium	6,835	Cambodian Premier League (3rd)

=== Personnel and kits ===
Team	Head coach	Captain	Kit manufacturer	Kit sponsors	
Team	Head coach	Captain	Kit manufacturer	Main	Other(s)
Angkor Tiger	(Japan) Sotaro Yasunaga	(Japan) Takuto Yasuoka	(Cambodia) NT Sport	nous	List: Front: EXSIZZLE-LINE, Pocari Sweat, Panasonic; Back: TVS, Resort Worx; Sleeves: Family Business Management Group; Shorts: Pablo Group, iStandard Inc.
Boeung Ket	(Republic of Ireland) Conor Nestor	(Cambodia) Mat Noron	(Thailand) Ego Sport^{1}	K9Win Investment	List: Front: Dragon Beer, Pocari Sweat, SpiderNET; Back: Wing Bank, Hertz; Sleeves: NTC; Shorts: None
ISI Dangkor Senchey	(Cambodia) Tum Saray	(Japan) Sonosuke Onda	(Cambodia) NT Sport	ISI Palm	List: Front: ISI E&C, GCM; Back: Jotun; Sleeves: ISI Pipe; Shorts: None
Kirivong Sok Sen Chey	(Singapore) Satyasagara	(Ghana) Samuel Ofori	(Cambodia) NT Sport	Krud	List: Front: Maline, Soma Group, U-Pay; Back: TK Avenue, V-ACTIVE; Sleeves: Richardsons Group, Mee Chiet; Shorts: None
Life Sihanoukville	(South Korea) Jung Dong-gyu	(Japan) Kanta Asami	(Cambodia) NT Sport	Life University	List: Front: None; Back: Life School, Life International School; Sleeves: Xihu Resort Hotel; Shorts: None
MOI Kompong Dewa	(Spain) Alex Dorado	(Brazil) Mateus Barbosa	(Cambodia) Forward Sportswear	Kompong Dewa Resort	List: Front: None; Back: Khayangan Beach Club; Sleeves: Arjuna Resort & Spa; Shorts: None
Nagaworld	(Cambodia) Khim Borey	(Cambodia) Kouch Sokumpheak	(Cambodia) Made by club	NagaWorld	List: Front: None; Back: None; Sleeves: None; Shorts: None
Phnom Penh Crown	(Ukraine) Oleg Starynskyi	(Cambodia) Orn Chanpolin	(Cambodia) Fan Sport	Pi Pay	List: Front: None Back: None; Sleeves: Pocari Sweat; Shorts: None
Preah Khan Reach Svay Rieng	(Republic of Ireland) Mattew McConkey	(Cambodia) Soeuy Visal	(Spain) Kelme	Orkide Villa	List: Front: AFB Investment, Lixin Group, Krud, Legend Cinemas; Back: Hanuman Beverages, moonmedia; Sleeves: V-ACTIVE, John Barr; Shorts: None
Royal Cambodian Armed Forces	(Cambodia) Phea Sopheaktra	(Japan) Shori Murata	(Cambodia) Dai Ek Sport	V-COLA	List: Front: V-ACTIVE; Back: Lyyon, Eva Premium Ice; Sleeves: Krud; Shorts: None
Visakha	(England) Scott Cooper	(Cambodia) Kan Mo	(Cambodia) Forward Sportswear	Prince Bank	List: Front: None; Back: None; Sleeves: Jin Bei Group, Visakha Foundation; Shorts: None

1. Contract suspended due to the 2025 Cambodia–Thailand border conflict, but kit still bears manufacturer's logo.

=== Managerial changes ===
Team	Outgoing	Manner	Exit date		Position in table	Incoming	Incoming date		Ref.
Team	Outgoing	Manner	Announced on	Departed on	Position in table	Incoming	Announced on	Arrived on	Ref.
PKR Svay Rieng	(Spain) Pep Muñoz	End of contract	25 May 2025		Pre-season	(Republic of Ireland) Mattew McConkey	3 June 2025		
Visakha	(Nigeria) Akeeb Tunji Ayoyinka	End of interim spell	27 May 2025		Pre-season	(England) Gerard Jones	27 May 2025		
Angkor Tiger	(Japan) Kota Miyagi	End of interim spell	29 May 2025		Pre-season	(Japan) Sotaro Yasunaga	29 May 2025		
Life Sihanoukville	(Germany) Jörg Steinebrunner	Mutual consent	6 June 2025		Pre-season	(South Korea) Heo Jae-won	16 June 2025		
MOI Kompong Dewa	(Cambodia) Sum Vanna	Mutual consent	July 2025		Pre-season	(Spain) Alex Dorado	14 July 2025		
Visakha	(England) Gerard Jones	Mutual consent	10 October 2025		7th	(England) Scott Cooper	17 November 2025		
Life Sihanoukville	(South Korea) Heo Jae-won	Sacked	12 November 2025		10th	(South Korea) Jung Dong-gyu	15 November 2025		

== Foreign players ==
The number of foreign players registered is 6 per team exclude naturalized player without any restriction to any confederation or region. A team can use 5 foreign players and 1 naturalized player on the field in each game.

Players name in bold indicates the player is registered during the mid-season transfer window.

Club	Player 1	Player 2	Player 3	Player 4	Player 5	Player 6	Naturalized player	Unregistered player(s)	Former player(s)
Angkor Tiger	(Argentina) **Facundo Aranda**	(Brazil) Matheus Freitas	(Japan) Mark Ajay Kurita	(Japan) Takara Masutani	(Japan) Takuto Yasuoka	(Netherlands) Guytho Mijland	(Cambodia) (Ivory Coast) Abdel Kader Coulibaly		(Brazil) Eduardo Júnior
Boeung Ket	(Australia) **Cyrus Dehmie**	(Australia) Louis Zabala	(Brazil) Iago Bento	(England) Charlie Scott	(New Zealand) **Myer Bevan**	(Scotland) Sean Kelly			(Lesotho) Thabiso Brown (Cameroon) Louis Ndongo
ISI Dangkor Senchey	(Brazil) Bruno Ernandes	(Japan) **Shogo Akiba**	(Japan) Sonosuke Onda	(Portugal) João Rodrigues	(Sierra Leone) Umaru Samura	(Guinea) Lancine Diakite		(Timor-Leste) Jhon Frith	(Brazil) Gabriel Silva (Nigeria) Emmanuel Chinonso
Kirivong Sok Sen Chey	(Cameroon) **Louis Ndongo**	(Ghana) **Abbey Agbodzie**	(Ghana) Samuel Ofori	(Nepal) Laken Limbu	(Nigeria) Azike Ekene				(Brazil) Eduardo Andrade (Japan) Kenta Hara (Canada) Kyle Degelman (Ghana) **Emmanuel Yaghr**
Life Sihanoukville	(Brazil) **Gabriel Silva**	(Ghana) **James Arthur**	(Japan) Kanta Asami	(South Korea) Kim Hyeon-su	(South Korea) **Kim Joung-ho**	(South Korea) Kim Joung-woo			(Timor-Leste) Georgino Mendonça (South Korea) Oh Tae-gyun (Japan) Shogo Akiba
MOI Kompong Dewa	(Brazil) Mateus Barbosa	(Brazil) Patrick Nonato	(Brazil) Ricardo Lima	(Brazil) Dida	(Indonesia) Lotra Widiyanto	(Indonesia) Sulthan Zaky	(Cambodia) (Uzbekistan) **Alisher Mirzaev**		
Nagaworld	(Brazil) Lucas Oliveira	(Brazil) Lucas Venuto	(Brazil) Mateus Martins	(Brazil) Weyderson China	(Brazil) Wisney Junio	(Japan) Yusuke Minagawa	(Cambodia) (Ivory Coast) Zogbe Vireak		
Phnom Penh Crown	(Bolivia) Makerlo Tellez	(South Korea) Park Yi-young	(Netherlands) Rick Ketting	(New Zealand) Moses Dyer	(Romania) Raul Feher	(Ukraine) Maksym Pryadun	(Cambodia) (Colombia) **Andrés Nieto**	(South Korea) Seo-In Kim^{1} (Brazil) **Breno Caetano**^{2} (Italy) **Pape Lo** (Ukraine) **Valeriy Hryshyn** (Canada) **Diego Gutiérrez**	
Preah Khan Reach Svay Rieng	(Brazil) Cristian Roque	(Brazil) Patrick	(Ghana) Kwame Peprah	(Japan) Takashi Odawara	(Morocco) **Faris Hammouti**	**(Scotland) Connor Shields**	(Cambodia) (Japan) Yudai Ogawa	(Japan) Ryo Fujii^{3} (Portugal) Tiago Alves^{4}	(Laos) Bounphachan Bounkong
Royal Cambodian Armed Forces	(Japan) Reiya Kinoshita	(Japan) Ryosuke Maeda	(Japan) Shori Murata	(Japan) So Kataoka	(Japan) Tomoki Taniguchi	(Nigeria) Valentine Ekejiuba	(Cambodia) (Japan) Hikaru Mizuno		
Visakha	(Brazil) **Lucas Dias**	(Ghana) Nana Oppong	(South Korea) Park Jung-bin	(Latvia) Vitālijs Jagodinskis	(Scotland) **Scott Allardice**	(Serbia) **Pavle Ivelja**	(Cambodia) (South Africa) Kan Mo		(Kenya) Benson Omala (Uzbekistan) Alisher Mirzaev (Brazil) Breno Caetano

Notes:

^1 Registered to play for the 2025–26 AFC Challenge League and 2025–26 Cambodian Development League only.
^2 Registered to play for the 2025–26 AFC Challenge League and 2025–26 Hun Sen Cup only.
^3 Registered to play for the 2025–26 AFC Challenge League and 2025–26 ASEAN Club Championship only.
^4 Registered to play for the 2025–26 AFC Challenge League and 2025–26 Hun Sen Cup only.

=== Foreign players by confederation ===
Foreign players by confederation
AFC	Australia (2), Indonesia (2), Japan (12), Nepal (1), South Korea (5)
CAF	Cameroon (1), Ghana (5), Guinea (1), Morocco (1), Nigeria (2), Sierra Leone (1)
CONMEBOL	Argentina (1), Bolivia (1), Brazil (16)
OFC	New Zealand (2)
UEFA	England (1), Latvia (1), Netherlands (2), Romania (1), Scotland (3), Serbia (1), Ukraine (1)

=== Players holding Cambodian dual citizenship ===
Cambodian dual nationals do not take up foreign players quota.

Club	Player 1	Player 2	Player 3	Player 4	Player 5
Angkor Tiger	(Ivory Coast) Abdel Kader Coulibaly				
Boeung Ket	(New Zealand) Aarun Lim				
ISI Dangkor Senchey					
Kirivong Sok Sen Chey	(Vietnam) Chou Hav	(France) Dani Kouch			
Life Sihanoukville	(France) Thierry Bin				
MOI Kompong Dewa	(New Zealand) Ashnarvy Mustapha	(France) Lucas Arthur	(Uzbekistan) Alisher Mirzaev		
Nagaworld	(Nigeria) Immanoel Aking Osamuj	(Ivory Coast) Zogbe Vireak			
Phnom Penh Crown	(Colombia) Andrés Nieto	(Sweden) (Burundi) Mohammath Hamisi			
Preah Khan Reach Svay Rieng	(Japan) Yudai Ogawa				
Royal Cambodian Armed Forces	(Japan) Hikaru Mizuno				
Visakha	(Ghana) Leng Nora	(South Africa) Kan Mo	(France) Loic Chan	(United States) Sitha Mathew	

== League table ==
=== Regular season ===
Pos	Team	Pld	W	D	L	GF	GA	GD	Pts	
1	Preah Khan Reach Svay Rieng	20	17	0	3	64	20	+44	51	Qualified to Championship round
2	Phnom Penh Crown	20	14	4	2	43	23	+20	46	Qualified to Championship round
3	Angkor Tiger	20	11	3	6	52	29	+23	36	Qualified to Championship round
4	Nagaworld	20	10	5	5	33	20	+13	35	Qualified to Championship round
5	Boeung Ket	20	9	5	6	26	17	+9	32	Qualified to Championship round
6	MOI Kompong Dewa	20	8	6	6	26	26	0	30	Qualified to Championship round
7	Visakha	20	7	8	5	36	28	+8	29	
8	Royal Cambodian Armed Forces	20	4	5	11	20	51	−31	17	
9	Kirivong Sok Sen Chey	20	4	2	14	22	44	−22	14	
10	Life Sihanoukville	20	3	1	16	17	48	−31	10	
11	ISI Dangkor Senchey	20	2	3	15	18	51	−33	9	

Source: Cambodian Premier League
Rules for classification: 1) Points; 2) Head to Head; 3) Goal difference; 4) Goals scored; 5) Disciplinary points

=== Results ===
Home \ Away	AKT	BKF	ISI	KSC	SHV	MKD	NGW	PPC	PKR	RCA	VSK
Angkor Tiger		3–0	8–0	0–0	3–1	1–1	0–1	4–3	0–3	7–1	2–3
Boeung Ket	0–1		3–1	1–0	3–0	2–0	1–1	1–1	2–1	1–1	0–0
ISI Dangkor Senchey	2–2	0–1		1–2	0–1	0–2	0–3	2–4	1–6	3–0	1–8
Kirivong Sok Sen Chey	0–4	0–2	2–0		2–1	2–4	1–3	1–4	0–5	0–2	0–0
Life Sihanoukville	1–3	0–2	2–1	2–1		0–1	0–2	3–4	1–4	0–3	1–3
MOI Kompong Dewa	3–6	1–0	0–0	5–3	0–0		0–3	0–1	1–2	0–0	1–1
Nagaworld	2–1	2–0	1–1	3–1	3–1	1–2		0–1	1–2	1–1	2–2
Phnom Penh Crown	3–0	1–0	1–0	3–1	3–0	1–1	2–1		2–3	3–2	2–1
PKR Svay Rieng	3–1	3–0	1–0	2–1	6–1	3–0	3–0	2–3		6–3	1–2
Royal Cambodian Armed Forces	0–3	0–6	1–3	0–4	1–0	0–3	0–2	1–1	1–6		2–1
Visakha	2–3	2–2	3–2	2–1	3–2	0–1	1–1	1–1	0–2	1–1	

Source: Cambodian Premier League
Legend: Blue = home team win; Yellow = draw; Red = away team win.

== Championship round ==
Pos	Team	Pld	W	D	L	GF	GA	GD	Pts		PKR	PPC	AKT	BKF	NGW	MKD
1	Preah Khan Reach Svay Rieng (C, Q)	30	21	3	6	83	34	+49	66	Qualification for the 2026-27 AFC Champions League Two group stage and 2026–27 ASEAN Club Championship	—	1–2	2–0	2–3	1–1	2–0
2	Phnom Penh Crown (Q)	30	17	5	8	53	36	+17	56 (Note: Head-to-head points: Phnom Penh Crown 7, Angkor Tiger 4.)	Qualification for the 2026-27 AFC Champions League Two group stage and 2026–27 ASEAN Club Championship	1–4	—	2–0	1–2	3–0	1–2
3	Angkor Tiger	30	17	5	8	71	43	+28	56		0–2	0–0	—	2–0	4–1	3–1
4	Boeung Ket	30	15	8	7	44	29	+15	53		0–0	2–0	1–1	—	1–0	4–3
5	Nagaworld	30	12	7	11	42	39	+3	43		1–1	1–0	1–3	1–3	—	2–0
6	MOI Kompong Dewa	30	11	7	12	41	46	−5	40		2–3	1–0	1–2	2–2	0–2	—

Updated to match(es) played on 19 May 2026. Source: Cambodian Premier League
Legend: Blue = home team win; Yellow = draw; Red = away team win.
Rules for classification: 1) Points; 2) Head to Head; 3) Goal difference; 4) Goals scored; 5) Disciplinary points
(C) Champions; (Q) Qualified for the phase indicated
Notes:
- Note : "Updated qualification spots for the 2026-27 Asian and ASEAN club competitions"

== Bottom-five round ==
Pos	Team	Pld	W	D	L	GF	GA	GD	Pts	VSK	KSC	RCA	SHV	ISI
1	Visakha	28	15	8	5	57	31	+26	53	—	3–0	4–0	2–0	2–0
2	Kirivong Sok Sen Chey	28	7	3	18	30	57	−27	24	1–3	—	3–2	0–1	1–1
3	Royal Cambodian Armed Forces	28	5	6	17	28	76	−48	21	1–3	3–1	—	0–4	1–1
4	Life Sihanoukville	28	6	2	20	28	59	−31	20	0–2	0–1	3–1	—	2–4
5	ISI Dangkor Senchey	28	4	6	18	32	61	−29	18	1–2	0–1	6–0	1–1	—

Updated to match(es) played on 10 May 2026. Source: Cambodian Premier League
Legend: Blue = home team win; Yellow = draw; Red = away team win.
Rules for classification: 1) Points; 2) Head to Head; 3) Goal difference; 4) Goals scored; 5) Disciplinary points

== Season statistics ==
=== Top scorers ===
As of 18 May 2026

Rank	Player	Club	Goals
1	(Ghana) Kwame Peprah	PKR Svay Rieng	24
2	(Japan) Mark Ajay Kurita	Angkor Tiger	20
3	(Brazil) Patrick	PKR Svay Rieng	17
4	(New Zealand) Moses Dyer	Phnom Penh Crown	15
4	(Netherlands) Guytho Mijland	Angkor Tiger	15
6	(Japan) Yusuke Minagawa	Nagaworld	13
6	(South Korea) Kim Hyeon-su	Life Sihanoukville	13
8	(South Korea) Park Jung-bin	Visakha	12
9	(Ukraine) Maksym Pryadun	Phnom Penh Crown	11
10	(Brazil) Patrick Nonato	MOI Kompong Dewa	10
10	(Nigeria) Azike Ekene	Kirivong Sok Sen Chey	10
12	(Brazil) Weyderson China	Nagaworld	9
13	(Australia) Cyrus Dehmie	Boeung Ket	8
13	(Ghana) Nana Kwame Oppong	Visakha	8
13	(Brazil) Bruno Ernandes	ISI Dangkor Senchey	8
16	(Cambodia) Sareth Krya	PKR Svay Rieng	7
16	(Brazil) Cristian Roque	PKR Svay Rieng	7
16	(Cambodia) Mat Noron	Boeung Ket	7
16	(Cameroon) Louis Willy Ndongo	Kirivong Sok Sen Chey	7
20	(Romania) Raul Feher	Phnom Penh Crown	6
20	(Cambodia) Eav Sovannara	Boeung Ket	6
20	(Brazil) Lucas Oliveira	Nagaworld	6
20	(Nigeria) Valentine Ekejiuba	Royal Cambodian Armed Forces	6
20	(Cambodia) Hav Soknet	ISI Dangkor Senchey	6

==== Hat-tricks ====
Player	For	Against	Result	Date
(Japan) Yusuke Minagawa	Nagaworld	ISI Dangkor Senchey	3–0 (A)	23 August 2025
(Brazil) Eduardo Junior	Angkor Tiger	ISI Dangkor Senchey	8–0 (H)	13 September 2025
(Ukraine) Maksym Pryadun	Phnom Penh Crown	Life Sihanoukville	3–4 (A)	14 September 2025
(Brazil) Patrick	PKR Svay Rieng	Life Sihanoukville	6–1 (H)	19 September 2025
(Romania) Raul Feher	Phnom Penh Crown	ISI Dangkor Senchey	4–2 (A)	19 October 2025
(Brazil) Patrick Nonato	MOI Kompong Dewa	Kirivong Sok Sen Chey	5–3 (H)	22 December 2025
(Australia) Cyrus Dehmie^{4}	Boeung Ket	Royal Cambodian Armed Forces	6–0 (A)	6 January 2026
(Ghana) Kwame Peprah	PKR Svay Rieng	Phnom Penh Crown	3–2 (A)	18 January 2026
(Japan) Mark Ajay Kurita	Angkor Tiger	Life Sihanoukville	3–1 (A)	8 February 2026
(Japan) Mark Ajay Kurita	Angkor Tiger	Royal Cambodian Armed Forces	7–1 (H)	22 February 2026
(Netherlands) Guytho Mijland	Angkor Tiger	Nagaworld	3–1 (A)	4 April 2026

Note: ^{4} – player who scored 4 goals

=== Top assists ===
Rank	Player	Club	Goals
1	(Japan) Takara Masutani	Angkor Tiger	11
2	(Cambodia) Sin Kakada	Visakha	10
3	(Brazil) Iago Bento	Boeung Ket	9
4	(Netherlands) Guytho Mijland	Angkor Tiger	8
5	(Cambodia) Min Ratanak	PKR Svay Rieng	7
5	(Brazil) Patrick	PKR Svay Rieng	7
5	(Brazil) Lucas Venuto	Nagaworld	7
5	(South Korea) Park Jung-bin	Visakha	7
9	(Cambodia) Sa Ty	Phnom Penh Crown	6
9	(Ukraine) Maksym Pryadun	Phnom Penh Crown	6
9	(Brazil) Lucas Oliveira	Nagaworld	6
9	(Cambodia) Sareth Krya	PKR Svay Rieng	6

=== Clean sheets ===
Rank	Player	Club	Clean sheets
1	(Cambodia) Koy Salim	Boeung Ket	12
2	(Cambodia) Vireak Dara	PKR Svay Rieng	9
3	(Cambodia) Reth Lyheng	Nagaworld	8
3	(Brazil) Dida	MOI Kompong Dewa	8
5	(Cambodia) Chiem Samnang	Phnom Penh Crown	7
6	(Cambodia) Keo Soksela	Visakha	6
7	(Cambodia) Yi Bunheng	Angkor Tiger	5
8	(Cambodia) Sou Sovaneat	Kirivong Sok Sen Chey	4
8	(Cambodia) Ron Chongmieng	Life Sihanoukville	4
10	(Cambodia) Um Sereyroth	Royal Cambodian Armed Forces	3
10	(Cambodia) Tin Razak	Angkor Tiger	3
10	(Cambodia) Um Vichet	Phnom Penh Crown	3
13	(Cambodia) Touch Manann	Kirivong Sok Sen Chey	2
13	(Cambodia) Soeun Rithvirakvathana	ISI Dangkor Senchey	2
15	(Cambodia) Hul Kimhuy	Visakha	1
15	(Cambodia) Mat Lany	Royal Cambodian Armed Forces	1
15	(Cambodia) Ly Kakada	ISI Dangkor Senchey	1
15	(Cambodia) Kim Chanveasna	MOI Kompong Dewa	1

== Awards ==
=== Monthly awards ===
Month	Player of the Month		References
Month	Player	Club	References
August	(Ghana) Kwame Peprah	PKR Svay Rieng	
September	(Ukraine) Maksym Pryadun	Phnom Penh Crown	
October	(Cambodia) Sokry Sofan	Angkor Tiger	
November	(Cambodia) Ouk Sovann	Visakha	
December	(Cambodia) Koeut Pich	Phnom Penh Crown	
January	(Japan) Yusuke Minagawa	Nagaworld	
February	(Japan) Mark Ajay Kurita	Angkor Tiger	
March	(Brazil) Weyderson China	Nagaworld	
April	(Netherlands) Guytho Mijland	Angkor Tiger	

=== Team of the Year ===
Season	Goalkeepers	Defenders	Midfielders	Forwards
2025–26	(Cambodia) Koy Salim	(Cambodia) Sareth Krya (Brazil) Mateus Barbosa (Romania) Raul Feher (Japan) Takuto Yasuoka	(Brazil) Patrick Robson (Cambodia) Sin Kakada (Cambodia) Mat Noron	(Japan) Mark Ajay Kurita (Ghana) Kwame Peprah (Japan) Yusuke Minagawa

== See also ==
- 2025–26 Hun Sen Cup
- 2025 Cambodian League Cup
- 2025 Cambodian Super Cup
