= 2025–26 Hun Sen Cup =

Cambodian football tournament

2025-26 Hun Sen Cup
Tournament details
- Country: Cambodia
- Venue: Morodok Techo National Stadium
- Dates: 25 February – 24 May 2026
- Teams: 30

Final positions
- Champions: Preah Khan Reach Svay Rieng
- Runners-up: Visakha
- Third place: Boeung Ket & ISI Dangkor Senchey

Tournament statistics
- Matches played: 100
- Attendance: 87,215 (872 per match)
- Top goal scorer: Nana Kwame (7 goals)

Awards
- Best player: Diakite

The 2025-26 Hun Sen Cup is the 19th season of the Hun Sen Cup, the premier knockout tournament for association football clubs in Cambodia.

== Provincial Stage ==
=== Third Place ===
21 December 2025	Phnom Penh Galaxy	1-6	Tboung Khmum	National (Olympic) Stadium
15:30 UTC+07	Muslim 40'		Pheara 35', 53'; Taimo 36'; Navin 79', 90+4', 90+7'

=== Final ===
21 December 2025	Lion King	1-2	Kampong Cham	National (Olympic) Stadium
18:00 UTC+07	Bruno 45+2'		Fidaus 24', 45+6'

The final and third place match of the 2025-26 Hun Sen Cup Provincial Stage draw a total attendance of 5179.

== National Stage ==
The top 11 teams from the 2025–26 Cambodian Premier League will participate in the competition along with the top 5 teams from 2025-26 Hun Sen Cup Provincial Stage. The tournament is played with home and away matches starting from the round of 16.

=== National Stage PLAY-OFFS ===
The National Stage Play-offs will decide which team claims the final spot in the Round of 16, drawing a total attendance of 193.

==== 1st round ====
23 December 2025	Kampong Speu	3–3 (4–3 p)	Preah Sihanouk	Kampong Speu Stadium
15:30 UTC+07	Raksmey 49'; Suyheng 66', 77'	Report	Davit 23', 39'; Kitama-abu 79'

23 December 2025	Battambang United	w/o	Kampot	National University of Battambang (NUBB)
15:30 UTC+07		Report

Kampot withdrew due to the recent border conflict.

==== 2nd round ====
30 December 2025	Kampong Speu	0–10	Battambang United	Kampong Speu Stadium
15:15 UTC+07		Report	Pisey 3', 11'; Samnang 8'; Vilik 31', 45+1', 74', 82'; Vichet 43'; Pisey 78', 86' (pen.)

=== Round of 16 ===
==== 1st leg ====
21 January 2026	Battambang United	2–5	Preah Khan Reach Svay Rieng	National University of Battambang (NUBB)
15:30 UTC+07	Vilik 28' (pen.); Tola 83'	Report	Baraing 11'; Dauna 27', 34'; Chanthea 45+4', 66'	Attendance: 3550

21 January 2026	Tboung Khmum	0–3	Phnom Penh Crown	Bun Rany Hun Sen Memot High School
15:30 UTC+07		Report	Breninho 20', 90+5' (pen.); Devit 90+2'	Attendance: 3450

21 January 2026	Lion King	0–9	Boeung Ket	Akihiro Kato Stadium
15:30 UTC+07		Report	Louis Zabala 12', 45+2'; Myer Bevan 22', 27', 35', 49'; Nava 42'; Vathanaka 74' (pen.); Sovannara 81'	Attendance: 430

21 January 2026	Phnom Penh Galaxy	0–13	Visakha	National Institute of Physical Education and Sports (NIPES)
15:30 UTC+07		Report	Nana Kwame 2', 9', 72', 75' (pen.); Pisoth 12'; Rotana 24', 26', 29'; Sophen 45+2', 59'; Sophanath 83'; Mathew 85'; Mony 90+2'	Attendance: 350

28 January 2026	Kirivong Sok Sen Chey	2–0	Angkor Tiger	Kirivong Stadium
15:30 UTC+07	Louis Willy 17', 37'	Report		Attendance: 187

28 January 2026	MOI Kompong Dewa	2–3	ISI Dangkor Senchey	Visakha Stadium
18:00 UTC+07	Lucas Arthur 22'; Vanda 74'	Report	Bunthab 7'; Bruno 36'; Diakite 39'	Attendance: 511

28 January 2026	Kampong Cham	0–4	Royal Cambodian Armed Forces	Preah Sihanouk High School
15:30 UTC+07		Report	Sokea 21'; Ekejiuba 40', 45'; Pisey 65'	Attendance: 1050

28 January 2026	Life Sihanoukville	1–0	Nagaworld	Life Stadium
18:00 UTC+07	Chandara 96+7'	Report		Attendance: 1089

==== 2nd leg ====
4 February 2026	Phnom Penh Crown	10–0	Tboung Khmum	Phnom Penh Crown Stadium
18:00 UTC+07	Devit 2', 7', 9', 49'; Tola 32', 69'; Breninho 50'; Socheavila 80'; Meas 82' (pen.); Muslim 90+2'	Report		Attendance: 540

Phnom Penh Crown won 13–0 on aggregate.

4 February 2026	Boeung Ket	1–0	Lion King	National (Olympic) Stadium
18:00 UTC+07	David 34'	Report		Attendance: 565

Boeung Ket won 10–0 on aggregate.

4 February 2026	Visakha	9–0	Phnom Penh Galaxy	Visakha Stadium
18:00 UTC+07	Sophen 30', 44'; Nana Kwame 32', 35', 56'; Pavle 72', 74'; Sodavid 84'; Rotana 90+7'	Report		Attendance: 642

Visakha won 22–0 on aggregate.

11 February 2026	Preah Khan Reach Svay Rieng	12–1	Battambang United	Morodok Techo National Stadium
18:00 UTC+07	Tiago Alves 3'; Kakada 11', 55', 56', 71', 80'; Baraing 19'; Dauna 23', 27', 45', 47'; Mony Udom 90+6'	Report	Pisey 77'	Attendance: 447

Preah Khan Reach Svay Rieng won 17–3 on aggregate.

11 February 2026	Angkor Tiger	3–2	Kirivong Sok Sen Chey	Akihiro Kata Stadium
18:00 UTC+07	Chhenchen 28'; Yasuoka 69'; Mark 82'	Report	Louis Willy 12', 59'	Attendance: 913

Kirivong Sok Sen Chey won 3–4 on aggregate.

11 February 2026	ISI Dangkor Senchey	0–0	MOI Kompong Dewa	ISI Park Stadium
18:00 UTC+07		Report		Attendance: 754

ISI Dangkor Senchey won 3–2 on aggregate.

11 February 2026	Royal Cambodian Armed Forces	2–1	Kampong Cham	RCAF (Old) Stadium
18:00 UTC+07	Ekejiuba 34' (pen.), 36'	Report	Fidaus 12'	Attendance: 255

Royal Cambodian ArmedForces won 6–1 on aggregate.

11 February 2026	Nagaworld	5–1	Life Sihanoukville	Kampong Speu Stadium
18:00 UTC+07	Lucas Venuto 1', 73'; Pisal 59' (o.g.); Minagawa 88'; Luquinha 90+8'	Report	Arthur 49'	Attendance: 211

Nagaworld won 5–2 on aggregate.

=== Quarter-finals ===
==== 1st leg ====
25 February 2026	Kirivong Sok Sen Chey	2–1	Preah Khan Reach Svay Rieng	Kirivong Sok Sen Chey Stadium
15:30 UTC+07	Louis Willy 6', 46'	Report	Tiago Alves 30'	Attendance: 195

25 February 2026	ISI Dangkor Senchey	2–2	Phnom Penh Crown	ISI Park Stadium
18:00 UTC+07	Samura 32'; Diakite 68'	Report	Breninho 55'; Dyer 73' (pen.)	Attendance: 1070

4 March 2026	Royal Cambodian Armed Forces	0–2	Boeung Ket	RCAF (Old) Stadium
18:00 UTC+07			Phearon 43'; Noron 78'	Attendance: 220

25 February 2026	Nagaworld	2–2	Visakha	Kampong Speu Stadium
18:00 UTC+07	Luquinha 32'; Mateus Martins 78'		Lucas Dias 56'; Kriya 90+3'	Attendance: 248

==== 2nd leg ====
11 March 2026	Boeung Ket	2–0	Royal Cambodian Armed Forces	National (Olympic) Stadium
18:00 UTC+07	Scott 26'; Sovannara 90+3'			Attendance: 531

Boeung Ket won 4–0 on aggregate.

11 March 2026	Visakha	4–0	Nagaworld	Visakha Stadium
18:00 UTC+07	Pavle 41', 45+2', 51'; Rotana 90+1'	Report		Attendance: 957

Visakha won 6–2 on aggregate.

18 March 2026	Phnom Penh Crown	0–2	ISI Dangkor Senchey	Phnom Penh Crown Stadium
18:00 UTC+07		Report	Soknet 32'; Diakite 90+2'	Attendance: 836

ISI Dangkor Senchey won 4–2 on aggregate.

18 March 2026	Preah Khan Reach Svay Rieng	4–1	Kirivong Sok Sen Chey	Morodok Techo National Stadium
18:00 UTC+07	Ogawa 11'; Sosidan 38'; Peprah 43'; Patrick 55'	Report	Azike 90+4' (pen.)	Attendance: 680

Preah Khan Reach Svay Rieng won 5–3 on aggregate.

=== Semi-finals ===
==== 1st leg ====
22 April 2026	Visakha	3–0	ISI Dangkor Senchey	Visakha Stadium
18:00 UTC+07	Jagodinskis 24'; Sonosuke 45+5' (o.g.); Nora 65'	Report		Attendance: 4317

29 April 2026	Boeung Ket	1–1	Preah Khan Reach Svay Rieng	National (Olympic) Stadium
18:00 UTC+07	Iago 86'	Report	Patrick 8'	Attendance: 4721

==== 2nd leg ====
29 April 2026	ISI Dangkor Senchey	1–4	Visakha	ISI Park Stadium
18:00 UTC+07	Sonosuke 86'	Report	Park Jung-bin 9', 18', 79'; Kriya 15'	Attendance: 1497

Visakha won 7–1 on aggregate.

20 May 2026	Preah Khan Reach Svay Rieng	3–2 (a.e.t.)	Boeung Ket	Morodok Techo National Stadium
18:00 UTC+07	Odawara 50'; Patrick 99', 109'	Report	Bevan 20'; Iago 120+6'	Attendance: 1859

Preah Khan Reach Svay Rieng won 4–3 on aggregate.

=== Final ===
24 May 2026	Preah Khan Reach Svay Rieng	4-4 (a.e.t.) (5–3 p)	Visakha	Morodok Techo National Stadium
19:00 UTC+07	Peprah 40', 73', 115'; Jagodinskis 90+6' (o.g.)	Report	Kakada 14'; Allardice 25'; Nora 69'; Meng 117'	Attendance: 13055

== See also ==
- 2025-26 Cambodian Premier League
- 2025-26 Cambodian League 2
