= 2024–25 Cambodian Premier League =

Cambodian Premier League
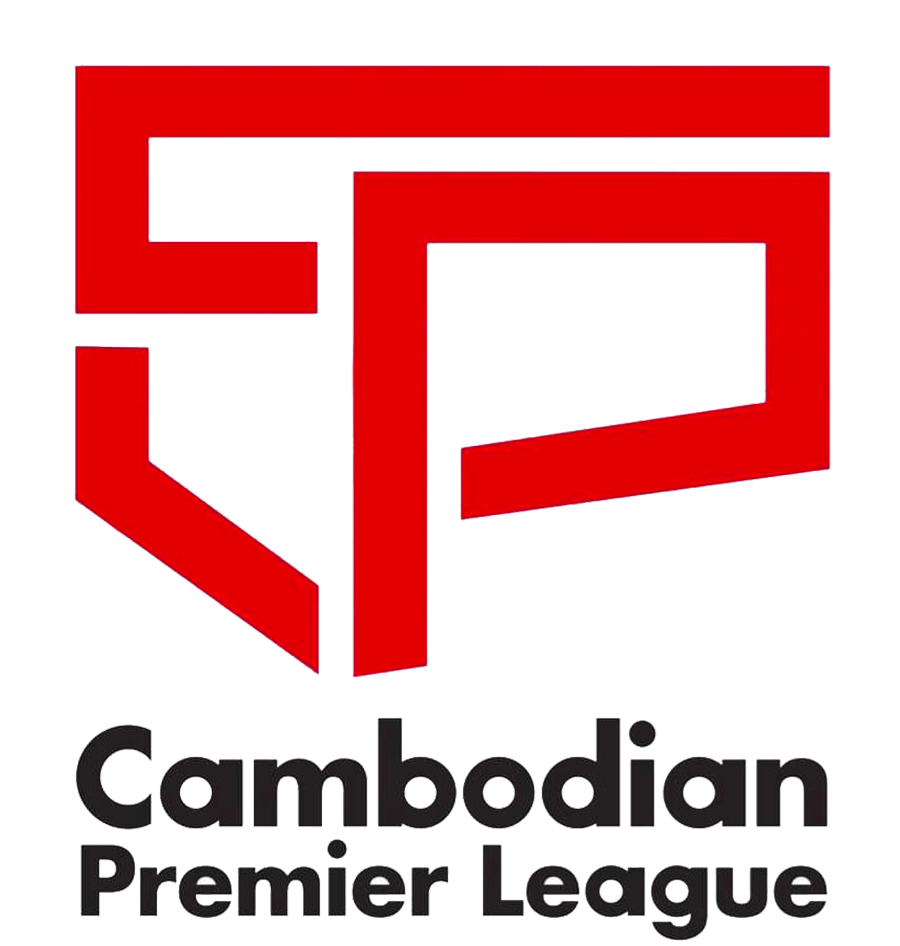
- Season: 2024–25
- Dates: 10 August 2024 – 18 May 2025
- Champions: PKR Svay Rieng (4th title)
- AFC Challenge League: PKR Svay Rieng FC; Phnom Penh Crown
- ASEAN Club Championship: PKR Svay Rieng FC
- Matches: 160
- Goals: 582 (3.64 per match)
- Top goalscorer: Ramon Tanque Andrés Nieto (21 goals)
- Biggest home win: Phnom Penh Crown 10–0 Life Sihanoukville (29 September 2024)
- Biggest away win: Ministry of Interior 0–9 Visakha (18 September 2024)
- Highest scoring: Phnom Penh Crown 10–0 Life Sihanoukville (29 September 2024)
- Longest winning run: 13 matches PKR Svay Rieng
- Longest unbeaten run: 16 matches each Phnom Penh Crown; PKR Svay Rieng
- Longest winless run: 18 matches Ministry of Interior
- Longest losing run: 15 matches Ministry of Interior
- Highest attendance: 5,438; Visakha 2–1 Angkor Tiger (18 May 2025)
- Lowest attendance: 101; Kirivong Sok Sen Chey 1–7 Tiffy Army (27 October 2024)
- Total attendance: 199,009
- Average attendance: 1,243

The 2024–25 Cambodian Premier League was the 40th season of the Cambodian Premier League, the top Cambodian professional league for association football clubs, since its establishment in 1982. The season started on 10 August 2024 and concluded on 18 May 2025.

Eleven teams competed in a double round-robin match before proceeding to the champion round. Life Sihanoukville and Ministry of Interior FA were promoted from the 2023–24 Cambodian League 2.

Preah Khan Reach Svay Rieng were the defending champions and retained their title, winning second in-a-row and their fourth league titles overall.

== Teams ==
Locations of the 2024–25 Cambodian Premier League teams

A total of 11 teams participated in the 2024–25 edition of the Cambodian Premier League.

=== Team changes ===
Promoted from 2023–24 Cambodian League 2	Relegated from 2023–24 Cambodian Premier League	Withdrew
▲ Life Sihanoukville (1st) ▲ Ministry of Interior FA (2nd)	None	~~Prey Veng~~

Life Sihanoukville made its debut, becoming the first club from Preah Sihanouk province to compete in the top-flight of Cambodian football. After changing its name from National Police, the Ministry of Interior FA returned to the Cambodian top division following two-year absence.

=== Stadiums and locations ===
Team	Location	Stadium	Capacity	Previous season
Angkor Tiger	Siem Reap Province	Akihiro Kato Stadium	2,000	Cambodian Premier League (10th)
Boeung Ket	Phnom Penh	Olympic Stadium	35,000	Cambodian Premier League (4th)
ISI Dangkor Senchey	Phnom Penh	AIA Stadium KMH PARK	3,000	Cambodian Premier League (6th)
Kirivong Sok Sen Chey	Takéo Province	Kirivong Sok Sen Chey Stadium	1,000	Cambodian Premier League (9th)
Life Sihanoukville	Sihanoukville	Life Stadium	3,000	Cambodian League 2 (1st)
Ministry of Interior FA	Phnom Penh	AIA Stadium KMH Park	3,000	Cambodian League 2 (2nd)
Nagaworld	Kampong Speu Province	Kampong Speu Stadium	3,000	Cambodian Premier League (7th)
Phnom Penh Crown	Phnom Penh	Smart RSN Stadium	5,010	Cambodian Premier League (2nd)
Preah Khan Reach Svay Rieng	Svay Rieng Province	Svay Rieng Stadium	4,000	Cambodian Premier League (1st)
Tiffy Army	Phnom Penh	RCAF Old Stadium	15,000	Cambodian Premier League (5th)
Visakha	Phnom Penh	Prince Stadium	10,000	Cambodian Premier League (3rd)

=== Personnel and kits ===
Team	Manager	Captain	Kit manufacturer	Shirt sponsor
Angkor Tiger	(Japan) Kota Miyagi	(Cambodia) Sophal Dimong	(Cambodia) NT Sport	Nous
Boeung Ket	(Republic of Ireland) Conor Nestor	(Cambodia) Mat Noron	(Thailand) EGO Sport	Cambodia Airways
ISI Dangkor Senchey	(Cambodia) Tum Saray	(Cambodia) Kang Sen	(Cambodia) NT Sport	ISI Palm
Kirivong Sok Sen Chey	(Singapore) Satyasagara	(Cambodia) Chhing Sokphanny	(Cambodia) NT Sport	Krud Beer
Life Sihanoukville	(Germany) Jörg Steinebrunner	(South Korea) Seo-In Kim	(Cambodia) NT Sport	
Ministry of Interior FA	(Cambodia) Sum Vanna	(Cambodia) Mat Yamin	(Cambodia) NT Sport	Borey Sambath Meanheng
Nagaworld	(Cambodia) Khim Borey	(Cambodia) Kouch Sokumpheak	(Thailand) FBT	NagaWorld
Phnom Penh Crown	(Ukraine) Oleg Starynskyi	(Cambodia) Orn Chanpolin	(Thailand) Warrix	Smart Axiata, Pi Pay
Preah Khan Reach Svay Rieng	(Spain) Pep Muñoz	(Cambodia) Soeuy Visal	(Thailand) FBT	Orkide Villa, Krud Beer
Tiffy Army	(Cambodia) Phea Sopheaktra	(Cambodia) Thorng Da	(Cambodia) Dai Ek Sport	TIFFY
Visakha	(Nigeria) Akeeb Tunji Ayoyinka (interim)	(Cambodia) Kan Mo	(Cambodia) Forward Sportswear	Prince Bank

=== Managerial changes ===
Team	Outgoing	Manner	Exit date		Position in table	Incoming	Incoming date		Ref.
Team	Outgoing	Manner	Announced on	Departed on	Position in table	Incoming	Announced on	Arrived on	Ref.
Life Sihanoukville	(Cambodia) Kong Vicheka	Mutual consent	2 April 2024		Pre-season	(Cambodia) Prak Sovannara	2 April 2024		
Visakha	(Cambodia) Meas Channa	Mutual consent	16 June 2024		Pre-season	(Latvia) Jurģis Kalns	16 June 2024		
Angkor Tiger	(Cambodia) Ny Yuth (interim)	End of caretaker spell	1 July 2024		Pre-season	(Japan) Kota Miyagi	1 July 2024		
Boeung Ket	(Cambodia) Hong Pheng (interim)	End of caretaker spell	8 October 2024		5th	(Republic of Ireland) Conor Nestor	8 October 2024		
Life Sihanoukville	(Cambodia) Prak Sovannara	Resigned	10 October 2024		9th	(Germany) Jörg Steinebrunner	18 October 2024		
ISI Dangkor Senchey	(Cameroon) Jean Botioba	Appointed as technical director	30 November 2024		7th	(Cambodia) Tum Saray	23 December 2024		
Kirivong Sok Sen Chey	(Cambodia) Sabone Venta	Appointed as technical director	21 January 2025		11th	(Singapore) Satyasagara	21 January 2025		
Visakha	(Latvia) Jurģis Kalns	Mutual consent	31 January 2025		3rd	(Nigeria) Akeeb Tunji Ayoyinka (interim)	1 February 2025		

== Foreign players ==
The number of foreign players is restricted to 6 per team exclude naturalized player. A team can use 5 foreign players and 1 naturalized player on the field in each game, including at least 2 players from the AFC and the AFF region.

Players name in bold indicates the player is registered during the mid-season transfer window.

Club	Player 1	Player 2	Player 3	Player 4	AFC Player	ASEAN Player	Naturalized Player	Unregistered Player(s)	Former Player(s)
Angkor Tiger	(England) Ben Nugent	(Japan) Kodai Nagashima	(Japan) Shuto Asano	(Japan) Taiga Kitajima	(Japan) Takuto Yasuoka	(Timor-Leste) João Pedro	**(Cambodia) (Ivory Coast) Abdel Kader Coulibaly**		
Boeung Ket	(Serbia) Stefan Golubović	(Brazil) Iago Bento	(Australia) **Alexander Kevin Baker**	(England) **Charlie Scott**	(Japan) Ryohei Yoshihama	(Philippines) **Scott Woods**			(Japan) Yusuke Muta (Japan) Yuto Hikida
ISI Dangkor Senchey	(Cameroon) Louis Willy Ndongo	(Japan) Sonosuke Onda	(Sierra Leone) Umaru Samura	(Cameroon) **David Koum**	(Japan) Kazu Yanagidate	(Timor-Leste) Jhon Frith			
Kirivong Sok Sen Chey	(Cameroon) Neville Tengeg	(Japan) **Kohei Kato**	(Uzbekistan) **Shokhrukhbek Kholmatov**		(Japan) **Reon Saito**				(Australia) Bradie Smith (Georgia (country)) Mikheil Ergemlidze (Vietnam) Nguyễn Ngọc Thi (Colombia) Johandre Padilla (Japan) Mahiro Takahashi
Life Sihanoukville	(Nigeria) Okoro Osa Orobosa	(Rwanda) Atuheire Kipson	(South Korea) Seo-In Kim	(United States) **Sam Strong**	(Japan) Kanta Asami	(Timor-Leste) Georgino Mendonça			(Samoa) Greg Siamoa
Ministry of Interior FA									
Nagaworld	(Brazil) Marcio Marques	(Brazil) Mateus Martins	(Japan) Yuta Kikuchi	(Japan) Yusuke Minagawa	(Japan) Hugo Kametani	(Myanmar) Thiha Zaw			
Phnom Penh Crown	(Netherlands) Jelle Goselink	(Nigeria) Ofufu Ibeh	(South Korea) **Park Yi-young**			(Philippines) Jarvey Gayoso	(Cambodia) (Japan) Takaki Ose (Cambodia) (Colombia) Andrés Nieto (Cambodia) (Japan) Yudai Ogawa		(Japan) Reo Kunimoto
Preah Khan Reach Svay Rieng	(Brazil) Gabriel Silva	(Brazil) **Moresche**	(Brazil) Cristian Roque	(Japan) Ryo Fujii	(Japan) Takashi Odawara	(Laos) Bounphachan Bounkong	(Cambodia) (Japan) Hikaru Mizuno	(Brazil) Pablo^{1} (Brazil) Breno Caetano^{2}	
Tiffy Army	(Japan) Tetsuaki Misawa	(Japan) Reiya Kinoshita	(Portugal) Josemar Agostinho	(Japan) **So Kataoka**	(Japan) Shori Murata				(Myanmar) Soe Moe Kyaw (Serbia) Nemanja Filipović
Visakha	(Brazil) Ramon Tanque	(Latvia) Vitālijs Jagodinskis	(Uzbekistan) Alisher Mirzaev	(Latvia) **Artūrs Karašausks**	(South Korea) Park Jung-bin	(Philippines) Mike Ott	(Cambodia) (South Africa) Kan Mo		(Spain) Víctor Blasco

Notes:

^1 Registered to play for the 2024–25 Hun Sen Cup and 2024–25 AFC Challenge League only.
^2 Registered to play for the 2024–25 AFC Challenge League only.

=== Players holding Cambodian dual citizenship ===
Cambodian dual nationals do not take up foreign players quota.

Club	Player 1	Player 2	Player 3	Player 4	Player 5
Angkor Tiger	(Ivory Coast) Abdel Kader Coulibaly				
Boeung Ket					
ISI Dangkor Senchey					
Kirivong Sok Sen Chey	(Vietnam) Dav Nim				
Life Sihanoukville					
Ministry of Interior FA	(Thailand) Nhoem Lyhour	(Sweden) (Burundi) Mohammath Hamisi	(Canada) Nicolas Min		
Nagaworld					
Phnom Penh Crown	(Japan) Yudai Ogawa	(Japan) Takaki Ose	(Colombia) Andres Nieto		
Preah Khan Reach Svay Rieng	(France) Dani Kouch	(France) Thierry Bin	(United States) Nick Taylor	(Japan) Hikaru Mizuno	(France) Lucas Arthur
Tiffy Army	(New Zealand) Aarun Lim				
Visakha	(Ghana) Leng Nora	(South Africa) Kan Mo	(New Zealand) Ashnarvy Mustapha		

== Regular season ==
=== League table ===
Pos	Team	Pld	W	D	L	GF	GA	GD	Pts	
1	Preah Khan Reach Svay Rieng	20	17	1	2	66	14	+52	52	Qualification for the Championship round
2	Phnom Penh Crown	20	16	3	1	66	22	+44	51	Qualification for the Championship round
3	Visakha	20	14	2	4	51	20	+31	44	Qualification for the Championship round
4	Angkor Tiger	20	11	4	5	40	23	+17	37	Qualification for the Championship round
5	Nagaworld	20	11	3	6	35	28	+7	36	Qualification for the Championship round
6	Boeung Ket	20	9	3	8	51	31	+20	30	Qualification for the Championship round
7	ISI Dangkor Senchey	20	7	3	10	31	45	−14	24	Qualification for the Bottom-five round
8	Tiffy Army	20	5	4	11	31	46	−15	19	Qualification for the Bottom-five round
9	Life Sihanoukville	20	2	4	14	17	53	−36	10	Qualification for the Bottom-five round
10	Kirivong Sok Sen Chey	20	1	3	16	17	68	−51	6	Qualification for the Bottom-five round
11	Ministry of Interior FA	20	1	2	17	17	72	−55	5	Qualification for the Bottom-five round

Source: Soccerway
Rules for classification: 1) Points; 2) Head to Head; 3) Goal difference; 4) Goals scored; 5) Disciplinary points

=== Results ===
Home \ Away	ANG	BOE	ISI	KSS	SHV	MIF	NAG	PPC	SVA	TIF	VIS
Angkor Tiger		1–0	2–2	6–0	2–0	4–1	1–1	1–1	2–3	5–0	0–2
Boeung Ket	0–0		8–1	3–1	5–1	4–1	1–3	1–3	1–2	1–1	0–2
ISI Dangkor Senchey	0–2	4–4		2–0	0–1	3–0	0–1	1–2	1–4	2–2	4–2
Kirivong Sok Sen Chey	1–3	1–2	1–2		1–1	4–1	1–5	0–6	0–6	1–7	1–2
Life Sihanoukville	2–3	1–4	0–1	1–1		1–1	1–2	0–5	1–3	3–1	0–3
Ministry of Interior FA	0–1	1–6	3–4	2–1	1–1		1–2	0–2	0–5	0–3	0–9
Nagaworld	0–1	1–5	3–1	2–0	2–0	5–2		2–6	0–2	2–3	1–1
Phnom Penh Crown	3–1	2–1	1–0	3–1	10–0	5–1	0–0		4–3	3–1	4–2
Preah Khan Reach Svay Rieng	4–2	2–0	6–0	6–1	2–0	5–0	2–0	3–1		7–0	1–0
Tiffy Army	1–2	2–5	1–2	1–1	3–2	3–1	0–2	1–2	0–0		1–3
Visakha	2–1	1–0	2–1	7–0	3–1	4–1	0–1	3–3	1–0	2–0	

Source: Soccerway
Legend: Blue = home team win; Yellow = draw; Red = away team win.

== Championship round ==
Pos	Team	Pld	W	D	L	GF	GA	GD	Pts		SVA	PPC	VIS	BOE	NAG	ANG
1	Preah Khan Reach Svay Rieng (C, Q)	30	25	1	4	91	25	+66	76	Qualification for the AFC Challenge League group stage and ASEAN Club Championship group stage	—	0–5	1–2	1–0	2–1	6–1
2	Phnom Penh Crown (Note: as Hun Sen Cup winners.) (Q)	30	23	3	4	92	37	+55	72	Qualification for AFC Challenge League qualifying play-off round	0–2	—	1–0	3–2	1–0	5–2
3	Visakha	30	21	2	7	67	32	+35	65		0–3	2–1	—	3–1	1–0	2–1
4	Boeung Ket	30	13	4	13	66	48	+18	43		0–1	4–3	1–3	—	0–0	2–1
5	Nagaworld	30	13	4	13	41	44	−3	43		4–0	2–4	1–0	1–2	—	0–2
6	Angkor Tiger	30	12	4	14	53	53	0	40		2–5	1–3	2–3	1–3	0–1	—

Source: Soccerway
Legend: Blue = home team win; Yellow = draw; Red = away team win.
Rules for classification: 1) Points; 2) Head to Head; 3) Goal difference; 4) Goals scored; 5) Disciplinary points
(C) Champions; (Q) Qualified for the phase indicated

== Bottom-five round ==
Pos	Team	Pld	W	D	L	GF	GA	GD	Pts	ISI	TIF	KSS	SHV	MIF
1	ISI Dangkor Senchey	28	13	3	12	47	51	−4	42	—	0–2	3–0	4–2	4–0
2	Tiffy Army	28	11	4	13	44	54	−10	37	2–1	—	0–3	1–0	4–1
3	Kirivong Sok Sen Chey	28	5	4	19	31	80	−49	19	0–1	1–3	—	2–0	2–1
4	Life Sihanoukville	28	4	5	19	26	68	−42	17	0–2	2–0	2–2	—	1–3
5	Ministry of Interior FA	28	2	2	24	25	91	−66	8	0–1	0–1	2–4	1–2	—

Source: Soccerway
Legend: Blue = home team win; Yellow = draw; Red = away team win.
Rules for classification: 1) Points; 2) Head to Head; 3) Goal difference; 4) Goals scored; 5) Disciplinary points

== Season statistics ==
=== Top scorers ===
Rank	Player	Club	Goals
1	(Cambodia) (Colombia) Andres Nieto	Phnom Penh Crown	21
2	(Brazil) Ramon Tanque	Visakha	21
3	(Brazil) Cristian Roque	PKR Svay Rieng	16
3	(Netherlands) Jelle Goselink	Phnom Penh Crown	16
5	(Philippines) Jarvey Gayoso	Phnom Penh Crown	14
5	(Nigeria) Ofufu Ibeh	Phnom Penh Crown	14
5	(Cambodia) Sieng Chanthea	Boeung Ket	14
5	(Japan) Yusuke Minagawa	Nagaworld	14
9	(Portugal) Josemar Agostinho	Tiffy Army	13
9	(Japan) Taiga Kitajima	Angkor Tiger	13

==== Hat-tricks ====
Player	For	Against	Result	Date
(Cambodia) (Colombia) Andres Nieto	Phnom Penh Crown	Kirivong Sok Sen Chey	6–0 (A)	15 September 2024
(Portugal) Josemar Agostinho	Tiffy Army	Ministry of Interior	3–1 (H)	22 September 2024
(Cambodia) (Colombia) Andres Nieto^{4}	Phnom Penh Crown	Life Sihanoukville	10–0 (H)	29 September 2024
(Japan) Yusuke Minagawa	Nagaworld	Ministry of Interior	5–2 (H)	27 October 2024
(Portugal) Josemar Agostinho^{4}	Tiffy Army	Kirivong Sok Sen Chey	7–1 (A)	27 October 2024
(Brazil) Pablo	PKR Svay Rieng	Kirivong Sok Sen Chey	6–0 (A)	30 November 2024
(Japan) Kodai Nagashima	Angkor Tiger	Kirivong Sok Sen Chey	6–0 (H)	4 January 2025
(Cambodia) Sieng Chanthea	Boeung Ket	ISI Dangkor Sen Chey	8–1 (H)	8 February 2025
(Japan) Reon Saito	Kirivong Sok Sen Chey	Tiffy Army	3–0 (A)	8 March 2025
(Brazil) Moresche	PKR Svay Rieng	Nagaworld	4–0 (A)	30 March 2025
(Cambodia) Nhean Sosidan	PKR Svay Rieng	Angkor Tiger	6–1 (H)	27 April 2025
(Nigeria) Ofufu Ibeh	Phnom Penh Crown	Nagaworld	4–2 (A)	4 May 2025

Note: ^{4} – player who scored 4 goals

=== Top assists ===
Rank	Player	Club	Assists
1	(Cambodia) Ouk Sovann	Visakha	19
2	(Cambodia) Lim Pisoth	Phnom Penh Crown	13
2	(Japan) Reiya Kinoshita	Tiffy Army	13
4	(Brazil) Márcio Marques	Nagaworld	11
4	(Japan) Ryohei Yoshihama	Boeung Ket	11
6	(Japan) Kodai Nagashima	Angkor Tiger	9
6	(Cambodia) Nhean Sosidan	PKR Svay Rieng	9
6	(Cambodia) Nick Taylor	PKR Svay Rieng	9
9	(Nigeria) Ofufu Ibeh	Phnom Penh Crown	8
9	(South Korea) Park Jung-bin	Visakha	8

=== Clean sheets ===
Rank	Player	Club	Clean sheets
1	(Cambodia) Vireak Dara	PKR Svay Rieng	14
2	(Cambodia) Yi Bunheng	Angkor Tiger	9
3	(Cambodia) Reth Lyheng	Nagaworld	8
4	(Cambodia) Saveng Samnang	Phnom Penh Crown	6
5	(Cambodia) Hul Kimhuy	Visakha	5
5	(Cambodia) Keo Soksela	Visakha	5
5	(Cambodia) Ly Kakada	ISI Dangkor Sen Chey	5
8	(Cambodia) Chheng Chantha	ISI Dangkor Senchey	3
8	(Cambodia) Mat Lany	Tiffy Army	3
8	(Cambodia) Um Vichet	Phnom Penh Crown	3
10	(Timor-Leste) Georgino Mendonça	Life Sihanoukville	2
10	(Cambodia) Pich Dara	Tiffy Army	2
10	(Cambodia) Sou Sovaneat	Kirivong Sok Sen Chey	2

== Awards ==
=== Monthly awards ===
Month	Player of the Month		References
Month	Player	Club	References
August	(Cambodia) Lim Pisoth	Phnom Penh Crown	
September	(Portugal) Josemar Agostinho	Tiffy Army	
October	(Japan) Yusuke Minagawa	Nagaworld	
November	(Netherlands) Jelle Goselink	Phnom Penh Crown	
December	(Cambodia) Vireak Dara	PKR Svay Rieng	
January	(Cameroon) Louis Willy Ndongo	ISI Dangkor Sen Chey	
February	(Cambodia) Nhean Sosidan	PKR Svay Rieng	
March	(Cambodia) (Colombia) Andres Nieto	Phnom Penh Crown	
April	(Cambodia) Reth Lyheng	Nagaworld	
May	(Japan) Reiya Kinoshita	Tiffy Army	
