= 2026–27 Cambodian League 2 =

Cambodian League 2
- Season: 2026–27

The 2026–27 Cambodian League 2 is the 7th season of the Cambodian League 2, second-tier football league for association football clubs in Cambodia. It will begin on November 2026.

== Teams ==
A total of 5 teams are participating in the 2026–27 edition of the Cambodian League 2 .

Team	Location	Stadium	Capacity	Previous season
Chheu Tom Pursat	Pursat Province	Chheu Tom Stadium		
Kandal United	Kandal Province	Smart Stadium		
Lion King	Siem Reap Province	Lion King Stadium		
Phnom Penh City	Phnom Penh	EDC Stadium		
Siem Reap United	Siem Reap Province	SRU Stadium		

=== Personnel and kits ===
Team	Manager	Captain	Kit manufacturer	Shirt sponsor
Chheu Tom Pursat	(Cambodia) Men Piphup	(Cambodia) Phon Tayninh	(Cambodia) Amatak Sport	
Kandal United	(Japan) Yuto Shimizu	(Cambodia) Leay Sokhong	(Cambodia) NT Sport	
Lion King	(Cambodia) Keo Sophal	(Cambodia) Men Piphup	(Cambodia) My Brand	
Phnom Penh City	(Cambodia) Sok Veasna	(Cambodia) Leng Makara	(Cambodia) Ying Sport	
Siem Reap United	(Spain) Oriol Mohedano	(Cambodia) Rim Chettra	(Cambodia) NT Sport	

== League table ==
Pos	Team	Pld	W	D	L	GF	GA	GD	Pts	
1	Chheu Tom Pursat	0	0	0	0	0	0	0	0	Promotion to 2027–28 Cambodian Premier League
2	Kandal United	0	0	0	0	0	0	0	0	Qualification to 2027–28 Cambodian Premier League qualifying play-off round
3	Lion King	0	0	0	0	0	0	0	0	
4	Phnom Penh City	0	0	0	0	0	0	0	0	
5	Siem Reap United	0	0	0	0	0	0	0	0	

Updated to match(es) played on 13 October 2026. Source: cpl-cambodia
Rules for classification: 1) Points; 2) Head to Head; 3) Goal difference; 4) Goals scored

== See also ==
- 2026–27 Cambodian Premier League
- 2026–27 Hun Sen Cup
- 2026 Cambodian Super Cup
