= Ryota Yanagizono =

Japanese footballer

Personal information
- Date of birth: 12 April 1996 (age 30)
- Place of birth: Tokyo, Japan
- Height: 1.72 m (5 ft 8 in)
- Position: Forward

Youth career
- Fujimi SC
- FC Tokyo
- Seibudai HS
- –2019: Tokyo International University

Senior career*
| Years | Team | Apps | (Gls) |
| 2019 | Viktoria Arnoldsweiler | 7 | (1) |
| 2019–2020 | SV Rott | 15 | (3) |
| 2021 | YSCC Yokohama | 9 | (0) |
| 2022– | Young Elephants | 4 | (0) |
- * Club domestic league appearances and goals as of 17:04, 14 March 2021 (UTC)

Ryota Yanagizono (柳園 良太, Yanagizono Ryota; born 12 April 1996) is a Japanese footballer who plays as a forward.

== Career ==
Yanagizono left Young Elephants after his contract expired at the end of the 2022 season.

== Career statistics ==
As of 14 March 2021

| Club | Season | League | | | National Cup | | League Cup | | Other | | Total | |
| Club | Season | Division | Apps | Goals | Apps | Goals | Apps | Goals | Apps | Goals | Apps | Goals |
|---|---|---|---|---|---|---|---|---|---|---|---|---|
| Viktoria Arnoldsweiler | 2018–19 | Mittelrheinliga | 7 | 1 | 0 | 0 | – | | 0 | 0 | 7 | 1 |
| SV Rott | 2019–20 | Landesliga | 15 | 3 | 0 | 0 | – | | 9 (Note: One appearance in the Middle Rhine Cup, six appearances and five goals in the Kreispokal Aachen, two appearances and one goal in the EVS-Cup) | 6 | 24 | 9 |
| YSCC Yokohama | 2021 | J3 League | 9 | 0 | 1 (Note: Appearances in the Emperor's Cup) | 0 | – | | 0 | 0 | 10 | 0 |
| Young Elephants FC | 2022 | Lao League | 3 | 0 | 0 (Note: Appearances in the Lao FF Cup) | 0 | – | 0 | 0 | 0 | 0 | |
| Career total | | | 31 | 4 | 1 | 0 | 0 | 0 | 9 | 6 | 41 | 10 |
