= Kanlaya Sysomvang =

Laotian footballer

Personal information
- Full name: Kanlaya Sysomvang
- Date of birth: 3 November 1990 (age 35)
- Place of birth: Vientiane, Laos
- Height: 1.72 m (5 ft 8 in)
- Position: Midfielder

Team information
- Current team: Young Elephants

Senior career*
Years	Team	Apps	(Gls)
2010–2011	Yotha FC		
2011–2013	Khon Kaen		
2013	Yotha FC		

International career
2009–2010	Laos U23	20	(4)
2010–2012	Laos	22	(5)

Managerial career
- 2018: Young Elephants (Assistant)
- 2018: Young Elephants
- 2021: Laos U23 (Assistant)
- 2021: Laos (Assistant)
- 2022: Laos U17
- 2023: Laos (Interim)
- 2024: Laos U19
- 2024: Laos U17
- 2024: Laos (assistant)
- 2026–: Young Elephants
- * Club domestic league appearances and goals

Kanlaya Sysomvang (born 3 November 1990) is a Laotian association football manager and former player. He is the head coach of Young Elephants.

== Club career ==
In 2010, he signed for MCTPC, now known as Yotha FC. He played there for 1 season before signing with Thai side Khon Kaen in 2011.

== International career ==
He represented Laos at the 2009 SEA Games and made his senior debut in 2010.
