= Moshtaq Ahmadi =

Afghan footballer (born 1996)

Personal information
- Date of birth: 21 April 1996 (age 30)
- Place of birth: Parwan, Afghanistan
- Height: 1.80 m (5 ft 11 in)
- Position: Forward

Youth career
- Ljungby

Senior career*
Years	Team	Apps	(Gls)
2015–2017	Ljungby	59	(14)
2018	Räppe	24	(6)
2019–2020	Linköping City	45	(6)
2021	Custom	9	(2)
2022	Ariana	6	(2)
2022	Räppe	7	(1)
2023	Piteå IF	12	(3)
2023–2024	Angkor Tiger	6	(0)

International career
2022–	Afghanistan	2	(0)
- * Club domestic league appearances and goals as of 11 December 2023

Moshtaq Ahmadi (Hazaragi: مشتاق احمدی, born 21 April 1996) is an Afghan footballer who plays as a forward for Angkor Tiger in the Cambodian Premier League.

== Career ==
Ahmadi started his career with Swedish fifth tier side Ljungby. Before the 2018 season, he signed for Räppe GOIF in the Swedish fourth tier. Before the 2019 season, Ahmadi signed for Swedish third-tier club Linköping City. In 2021, he signed for Custom in Thailand. Before the 2022 season, he signed for Swedish team Ariana FC.
