= Kittisak Phomvongsa =

Laotian footballer

Personal information
- Date of birth: 27 July 1999 (age 27)
- Place of birth: Khammouane, Laos
- Height: 1.74 m (5 ft 9 in)
- Position: Center back

Team information
- Current team: Young Elephants
- Number: 6

Senior career*
Years	Team	Apps	(Gls)
2018–	Young Elephants	118	(12)

International career
2018–	Laos	3	(0)
- * Club domestic league appearances and goals as of 20:12, 21 January 2019 (UTC)

Kittisak Phomvongsa (born 27 July 1999) is a Laotian footballer currently playing as a center back for Lao League 1 club Young Elephants.

== Career statistics ==
=== International ===
As of matches played 21 January 2019.

National team	Year	Apps	Goals
Laos	2018	3	0
Total		3	0
