= Maksim Taleyko =

Belarusian footballer

Personal information
- Full name: Maksim Ivanavich Taleyka
- Date of birth: 20 February 1993 (age 33)
- Place of birth: Stolbtsy, Minsk Oblast, Belarus
- Height: 1.83 m (6 ft 0 in)
- Position: Midfielder

Youth career
- 2008–2009: RUOR Minsk
- 2008–2009: BATE Borisov

Senior career*
Years	Team	Apps	(Gls)
2010	Gorodeya	16	(0)
2011	Shakhtyor Soligorsk	0	(0)
2012	Isloch Minsk Raion	29	(4)
2013	Smolevichi-STI	11	(0)
2013–2014	Isloch Minsk Raion	17	(1)
2014	Smorgon	0	(0)
2015–2017	Krumkachy Minsk	52	(2)
2017	Slutsk	4	(0)
2018	Isloch Minsk Raion	14	(1)
2019	NFK Minsk	22	(0)
2020	Kaganat	0	(0)
2020	Smorgon	6	(0)
2021	Angkor Tiger	18	(2)

International career
2008–2009	Belarus U17		
- * Club domestic league appearances and goals as of 31 December 2021

Maksim Ivanavich Taleyka (Belarusian: Максім Іванавіч Талейка; Russian: Максим Иванович Талейко; born 20 February 1993) is a Belarusian former professional footballer.
