= Patrick (footballer, born May 1998) =

Brazilian footballer

Personal information
- Full name: Patrick Robson de Souza Monteiro
- Date of birth: 11 May 1998 (age 28)
- Place of birth: Brasília, Brazil
- Height: 1.82 m (6 ft 0 in)
- Position: Forward

Team information
- Current team: Preah Khan Reach Svay Rieng
- Number: 98

Youth career
- –2018: America-RJ
- 2019: Bonsucesso

Senior career*
Years	Team	Apps	(Gls)
2019	Friburguense	1	(0)
2020–2021	SV Horn	30	(6)
2021–2022	Admira Wacker	8	(1)
2022	→ Gabala (loan)	10	(0)
2022–2024	Tirana	41	(10)
2024–2025	Hatta Club	25	(11)
2025–	Preah Khan Reach Svay Rieng	26	(17)
- * Club domestic league appearances and goals as of 17 May 2026

Patrick Robson de Souza Monteiro (born 11 May 1998), commonly known as Patrick Alfinete or just Patrick, is a Brazilian professional footballer who plays as a forward for Cambodian Premier League club Preah Khan Reach Svay Rieng.

== Club career ==
On 9 July 2021 he joined Admira Wacker in Austria.

On 11 January 2022, Gabala announced the signing of Patrick on loan from Admira Wacker until the summer of 2023. On 11 July 2022, Gabala announced that Patrick's loan had been ended early.

== Career statistics ==
=== Club ===
As of match played 9 May 2022

Appearances and goals by club, season and competition
Club	Season	League			Cup		Continental		Total	
Club	Season	Division	Apps	Goals	Apps	Goals	Apps	Goals	Apps	Goals
Horn	2019–20	2. Liga	8	3	0	0	—	—	8	3
Horn	2020–21	2. Liga	22	3	2	0	—	—	24	3
Horn	Total		30	6	2	0	0	0	32	6
Admira Wacker	2021–22	Bundesliga	8	1	0	0	—	—	8	1
Gabala (loan)	2021–22	Azerbaijan Premier League	10	0	3	0	—	—	13	0
Career total			48	7	5	0	0	0	53	7

== Honours ==
Tirana

- Kategoria Superiore runner-up:2022–23
- Kupa e Shqipërisë runner-up:2022–23
- Albanian Supercup: 2022

Preah Khan Reach Svay Rieng

- Cambodian Premier League: 2025–26
- Cambodian Super Cup: 2025
- AFC Challenge League runner up: 2025–26

Individual

- Kupa e Shqipërisë Top Goalscorer: 2022–23
- Cambodian Premier League Best 11: 2025–26
