= Stephan Mensah =

German footballer (born 2000)

Personal information
- Date of birth: 1 June 2000 (age 26)
- Place of birth: Karlsruhe, Germany
- Height: 1.73 m (5 ft 8 in)
- Position: Left winger

Team information
- Current team: Angkor Tiger
- Number: 7

Youth career
- –2019: Karlsruher SC

Senior career*
| Years | Team | Apps | (Gls) |
| 2019–2022 | SpVgg Unterhaching | 8 | (0) |
| 2020 | → 1860 Rosenheim (loan) | 1 | (0) |
| 2022 | 1860 Rosenheim | 13 | (3) |
| 2022–2024 | Chemnitzer FC | 51 | (4) |
| 2024–2026 | Kickers Offenbach | 43 | (5) |
| 2026– | Angkor Tiger | 5 | (1) |

International career^{‡}
| 2016 | Germany U17 | 2 | (1) |
| 2017 | Germany U18 | 1 | (0) |
- * Club domestic league appearances and goals as of 9 November 2026 ‡ National team caps and goals as of 12:54, 8 December 2020 (UTC)

Stephan Mensah (born 1 June 2000) is a German footballer who plays as a left winger for Angkor Tiger.

== Career ==
Born in Karlsruhe, Mensah started his career at Karlsruher SC, before signing for SpVgg Unterhaching on a three-year contract in June 2019. He made his debut for Unterhaching on 26 October 2019, coming on as a second-half substite for Schröter in a 0–0 draw at home to FSV Zwickau. On 31 January 2020, Mensah joined TSV 1860 Rosenheim on loan until the end of the season.

Mensah returned to Rosenheim on a permanent deal in January 2022.

On 20 July 2022, Mensah signed a two-year contract with Regionalliga Nordost club Chemnitzer.
