= Jelle Goselink =

Dutch footballer (born 1999)

Personal information
- Date of birth: 31 July 1999 (age 27)
- Place of birth: Maarssenbroek, Netherlands
- Height: 1.89 m (6 ft 2 in)
- Position: Forward

Team information
- Current team: Kickers Offenbach
- Number: 19

Youth career
- OSM '75
- –2013: Elinkwijk
- 2013–2019: Almere City

Senior career*
| Years | Team | Apps | (Gls) |
| 2015–2019 | Jong Almere City | 50 | (14) |
| 2019–2021 | Almere City | 7 | (0) |
| 2020–2021 | → Helmond Sport (loan) | 33 | (8) |
| 2021–2023 | Helmond Sport | 54 | (9) |
| 2023–2024 | Borneo Samarinda | 9 | (0) |
| 2023–2024 | → Phnom Penh Crown (loan) | 0 | (0) |
| 2024–2025 | Phnom Penh Crown | 25 | (16) |
| 2025– | Kickers Offenbach | 25 | (4) |
- * Club domestic league appearances and goals as of 24 September 2026

Jelle Goselink (born 31 July 1999) is a Dutch professional footballer who plays as a forward for German Regionalliga Südwest club Kickers Offenbach.

== Career ==
Born in Maarssenbroek, Goselink started his career at the academy of Almere City, before playing in the Derde Divisie and Tweede Divisie with Jong Almere City. Goselink made his debut for Almere City on 9 August 2019 in a 1–1 draw away to Roda JC in the Eerste Divisie.

He signed for Eerste Divisie side Helmond Sport on a season-long loan in September 2020. On 21 June 2021, he signed a permanent deal with the club; a two-year contract.

On 17 June 2025, Goselink joined German Regionalliga Südwest side Kickers Offenbach.
