= Alistair Heath =

English football manager

Personal information
- Full name: Alistair Francis Heath
- Date of birth: 30 October 1984 (age 41)
- Place of birth: Birmingham, England

Managerial career
- Years: Team
- 2021–2023: Angkor Tiger

Alistair Francis Heath is an English football manager. Besides England, he has managed in South Korea, Thailand, and Cambodia.

== Coaching career ==
Between 2015 and 2021, Heath worked with Leicester City as head coach of their international academy.

In December 2021, Heath was appointed manager of Cambodian Premier League club Angkor Tiger, his first managerial role. He left the club at the start of the 2023 season.
