= Siem Reap United =

Cambodian football club

Siem Reap United FC
- Full name: Siem Reap United Football Club
- Founded: 2019; 7 years ago
- Ground: SRU Stadium
- Coach: Oriol Mohedano
- League: Cambodian League 2

Siem Reap United Football Club is a football club based in Siemreap, Cambodia. It plays in the Cambodian League 2, the second division of Cambodian football.

== Players ==
Note: Flags indicate national team as defined under FIFA eligibility rules; some limited exceptions apply. Players may hold more than one non-FIFA nationality.

No.	Pos.	Nation	Player
1	GK	CAM	Sok Kimseng
2	DF	CAM	Phin Phearith
3	DF	CAM	Thoeurn Vathib
4	DF	CAM	Chai Sokim
5	DF	CAM	Mat Failin
6	DF	NGR	Yahaya Saidu Yunisa
7	MF	CAM	Sat Long
8	MF	CAM	Thon Rahol
9	FW	NGR	Oyemade Victor
10	MF	CAM	Ito Seito (Captain)
11	FW	CAM	Doeun Gitong
12	GK	CAM	Heng Bora

No.	Pos.	Nation	Player
17	DF	CAM	Sem Sinath
18	MF	CAM	Min Virithira
19	DF	CAM	Yeng Yik
20	MF	CAM	Roth Sombo
21	DF	CAM	Roeun Seange
25	FW	CAM	Peng Sokheng
27	DF	CAM	Rim Chetra
30	MF	NGR	Timothy Afolabi
37	GK	JPN	Yuya Kuriyama
47	FW	CAM	Phoeuk Thatthai
66	FW	CAM	Chandara Ratanak
99	FW	NGR	Okereke Timothy
