= Manny Aguek =

South Sudanese footballer (born 2000)

Personal information
- Full name: Manyluak Aguek
- Date of birth: 8 February 2000 (age 26)
- Place of birth: South Sudan
- Height: 1.83 m (6 ft 0 in)
- Position: Forward

Team information
- Current team: Angkor Tiger
- Number: 10

Youth career
- Sunshine George Cross

Senior career*
Years	Team	Apps	(Gls)
2017	Sunshine George Cross	2	(0)
2017–2020	South Melbourne	4	(0)
2020–2021	Western United NPL	14	(12)
2021	Western United	2	(0)
2021–2022	Central Coast Mariners	1	(0)
2022–2023	→ Avondale (loan)	23	(6)
2023	Avondale	15	(7)
2023–2024	Balzan	7	(0)
2024–2025	Avondale	27	(13)
2025	South Melbourne	6	(5)
2026	Tarxien Rainbows	8	(1)
2026–	Angkor Tiger	7	(8)

International career^{‡}
2024–	South Sudan	1	(0)
- * Club domestic league appearances and goals as of 9 November 2026 ‡ National team caps and goals as of 1 June 2021

Manyluak Aguek (born 8 February 2000) is a South Sudanese professional soccer player who plays as a forward for Maltese club Tarxien Rainbows, as well as the South Sudan national team.

== Early life ==
Aguek was born in South Sudan, and moved to Australia in 2004 as his family searched for opportunity and education. He and his brothers had enjoyed playing soccer from a young age.

== Club career ==
Aguek has previously played at Balmoral City, Sunshine Heights, Caroline Springs George Cross and South Melbourne, before gaining a move to Western United in the A-League. He then joined Central Coast Mariners before returning to National Premier Leagues Victoria with Avondale. He moved to Balzan in Malta but soon returned to Avondale. In 2025 he rejoined South Melbourne.

== International career ==
Aguek made his debut for the South Sudan national team on 11 June 2024, in a 2026 World Cup qualifier against Sudan at the Juba Stadium. He substituted Peter Chol in the 80th minute, as Sudan won 3–0.
