= Vireak Dara =

Cambodian footballer

Personal information
- Full name: Vireak Dara
- Date of birth: 30 October 2003 (age 23)
- Place of birth: Battambang, Cambodia
- Height: 1.86 m (6 ft 1 in)
- Position: Goalkeeper

Team information
- Current team: Preah Khan Reach Svay Rieng
- Number: 27

Youth career
- 2018–2020: Visakha

Senior career*
Years	Team	Apps	(Gls)
2020–2022	Prey Veng		
2022–2024	Visakha	17	(0)
2023–2024	→ Preah Khan Reach Svay Rieng (loan)	25	(0)
2024–	Preah Khan Reach Svay Rieng	60	(1)

International career^{‡}
2019	Cambodia U19	3	(0)
2023	Cambodia U20	2	(0)
2021–2023	Cambodia U23	1	(0)
2023–	Cambodia	9	(0)
Medal record
Men's football
Representing Cambodia
FIFA ASEAN Challenge Cup
Runner-up	2026 Hong Kong
- * Club domestic league appearances and goals as of 9 November 2026 ‡ National team caps and goals as of 10 June 2026

Vireak Dara (born 30 October 2003) is a Cambodian professional footballer who plays as a goalkeeper for Cambodian Premier League club Preah Khan Reach Svay Rieng and the Cambodia national team.

== Club career ==
On 19 November 2025, Dara broke two records where he scored just nine seconds after kick-off during the Cambodian Premier League match between Preah Khan Reach Svay Rieng 6–1 win over ISI Dangkor Senchey where he also was named Man of the Match. Dara received a quick pass from midfielder Yudai Ogawa immediately after kick-off and launched a long ball that bounced past the opposing keeper. The Cambodian Premier League has officially clocked the strike at nine seconds, making it the fastest goal in the league's history. Preah Khan Reach Svay Rieng then submitted his goal to the Guinness World Records to seek recognition for beating Asmir Begović 13 seconds record in the English Premier League on 2 November 2013 against Southampton.

== International career ==
Dara make his debut on 5 September 2024 during the 2027 AFC Asian Cup qualification match against Sri Lanka.

== Controversial ==
During the 2024 ASEAN Championship match against Singapore on 11 December 2024, Dara made two horrendous mistakes that led to both of Singapore's goals within the first 16 minutes. In the 9th minute, a back pass from a Cambodian defender caught Dara off guard, and he missed the ball allowing Singapore's Faris Ramli to finish easily into an open net. Just 7 minutes later, another back pass from a defender was mishandled by Dara, whose one-touch pass was intercepted by Shawal Anuar who slotted the ball in to make it 2–0. Following the match, fans voiced suspicions that Dara had intentionally conceded the goals, leading to allegations of match-fixing. In response to these concerns, general Sao Sokha, the president of the Football Federation of Cambodia and the head of Cambodia's military police, announced that an investigation would be launched to clarify the situation.

== Career statistics ==
=== International ===
As of matches played 17 September 2024.

National team	Year	Apps	Goals
Cambodia	2024	3	0
Total		3	0

== Honours ==
Visakha

- Hun Sen Cup: 2022

Preah Khan Reach Svay Rieng

- Cambodian Premier League: 2023–24
- Hun Sen Cup: 2023–24
- AFC Challenge League runner-up: 2024–25

Individual

- Cambodian Premier League Golden Gloves: 2023–24, 2024–25, 2025–26
- Hun Sen Cup Golden Gloves: 2023–24
