= Ruben Hoogenhout =

Dutch footballer

Personal information
- Date of birth: 14 April 1999 (age 27)
- Place of birth: Abcoude, Netherlands
- Height: 1.92 m (6 ft 4 in)
- Position: Centre-back

Team information
- Current team: Angkor Tiger
- Number: 87

Youth career
- FC Abcoude
- 2008–2016: Ajax Youth Academy

Senior career*
Years	Team	Apps	(Gls)
2016–2020	Jong FC Utrecht	38	(1)
2020–2022	Miedź Legnica II	19	(2)
2020–2024	Miedź Legnica	39	(1)
2022–2023	→ Resovia (loan)	25	(1)
2024–2025	Enosis Neon Paralimni	28	(0)
2025	Ilioupoli	0	(0)
2026	Al Shabab		
2026–	Angkor Tiger	7	(0)

International career
2014–2015	Netherlands U16	4	(0)
- * Club domestic league appearances and goals as of 9 November 2026

Ruben Hoogenhout (born 14 April 1999) is a Dutch professional footballer who plays as a centre-back for Cambodian Premier League club Angkor Tiger.

== Club career ==
He made his professional debut in the Eerste Divisie for Jong FC Utrecht on 10 March 2017 in a game against Achilles '29.

On 5 November 2020, he joined Miedź Legnica II. Shortly after, he was promoted to the first team roster.

On 6 July 2022, Hoogenhout moved on loan to I liga club Resovia for one year.

On 1 August 2024, he left Miedź by mutual consent after asking the club to have his contract terminated.

On 16 August 2024, he signed with Cypriot First Division side Enosis Neon Paralimni, only to move to Greek side Ilioupoli a year later.

On 22 July 2026, Hoogenhout moved to Cambodian Premier League club Angkor Tiger.

== International career ==
Hoogenhout played 4 games for the Netherlands national under-16 football team.

== Honours ==
Miedź Legnica

- I liga: 2021–22
