= Satyasagara =

Singaporean football manager (born 1965)

Personal information
- Full name: Satyasagara
- Date of birth: 2 July 1964 (age 62)
- Place of birth: Singapore

Team information
- Current team: Kirivong Sok Sen Chey (head coach)

Managerial career
- Years: Team
- 2011: Tampines Rovers (assistant)
- 2012: Gombak United
- 2013: LionsXII (assistant)
- 2013: Singapore U23 (assistant)
- 2014–2015: Negeri Sembilan (assistant)
- 2015–2016: Hougang United
- 2017–2018: Singapore Women
- 2018–2019: Chennai City (assistant)
- 2020–2021: Chennai City
- 2022–2023: Young Elephants
- 2025–: Kirivong Sok Sen Chey

Satyasagara, formerly known as K. Balagumaran, is a Singaporean football coach and former footballer where he is currently the head coach of Cambodian Premier League club Kirivong Sok Sen Chey

== Managerial career ==
=== Gombak United ===
Satyasagara started his first managerial career with S.League club Gombak United in January 2012. He left the club at the end of the season following Gombak United dissolvement.

==== Working with V.Sudramoorthy ====
In 2013, Satyasagara joined V. Sundramoorthy as his assistant with LionsXII and also the Singapore U23 side. In 2014, Satyasagara followed V.Sundramoorthy working under him at Malaysia Premier League club Negeri Sembilan.

=== Hougang United ===
On 2 November 2015, Satyasagara became the head coach of Hougang United.

=== Singapore Women ===
On 8 August 2017, Satyasagara was announced as the head coach of the Singapore Women national team. However, he left the squad on 22 October 2018.

=== Chennai City ===
In 2018, Satyasagara was the assistant coach of Chennai City under head coach, Akbar Nawas. On 10 December 2020, he was promoted to head coach where he signed fellow countrymen, Iqbal Hussain from Geylang International.

=== Young Elephants ===
In March 2022, Satyasagara was appointed as the head coach of Lao League 1 side Young Elephants. In his first season, he helped the club won the 2022 Lao League 1 with the club being undefeated in the entire season. He repeated the feat in the 2023 season and added to that by winning the cup. Satyasagara left the club at the end of 2023 after his contract with the club ended.

=== Kirivong Sok Sen Chey ===
On 20 January 2025, Satyasagara sign with Cambodian Premier League club Kirivong Sok Sen Chey.

== Honours ==
Young Elephants

- Lao League 1: 2022, 2023
- Lao FF Cup: 2022
