= Mateus Barbosa =

Brazilian footballer

Personal information
- Full name: Mateus Barbosa Soares
- Date of birth: 12 January 1999 (age 27)
- Place of birth: Pirassununga, Brazil
- Height: 1.93 m (6 ft 4 in)
- Position: Central defender

Youth career
- 2017–2019: Figueirense
- 2018–2019: → Palmeiras (loan)

Senior career*
Years	Team	Apps	(Gls)
2018	→ PSTC-PR (loan)		
2019	→ PSTC-PR (loan)		
2019–2020	PSTC-PR	8	(0)
2019	→ Azuriz (loan)		
2020–2021	Mafra	1	(0)
2021	→ Loures (loan)	11	(1)
2021–2022	Episkopi	23	(1)
2022–2024	Kifisia	13	(1)
2023–2024	→ Ilioupolis (loan)	6	(1)
2024–2025	Atyrau	23	(2)
2025–2026	MOI Kompong Dewa	24	(5)
2026–	PKR Svay Rieng FC		
- * Club domestic league appearances and goals

Mateus Barbosa Soares (born 12 January 1999) is a Brazilian professional footballer who plays as a central defender.

== Career ==
He signed three years contract with Liga Portugal 2 club, Mafra in 2020. He signed for Super League Greece 2 club Kifisia in 2022, followed by Kazakhstan Premier League club Atyrau in 2024. In 2025, Mateus joined Cambodian Premier League club MOI Kompong Dewa.

== Honours ==
Kifisia

- Super League Greece 2 champion: 2022–23
