= Andrés Nieto =

Cambodian footballer (born 1996)

Personal information
- Full name: Rafael Andrés Nieto Rondón
- Date of birth: 29 April 1996 (age 30)
- Place of birth: Bogotá, Colombia
- Height: 1.76 m (5 ft 9 in)
- Position: Attacking midfielder

Team information
- Current team: Visakha
- Number: 70

Youth career
- 2002–2012: Academia Tolimense de Fútbol
- 2013–2014: Deportes Tolima

Senior career*
Years	Team	Apps	(Gls)
2015–2017	Real Frontera		
2018	Atlético San Francisco		
2019	O&M		
2020–2025	Phnom Penh Crown	107	(65)
2025	Bhayangkara Presisi	6	(0)
2025–2026	Phnom Penh Crown	20	(4)
2026–	Visakha	7	(3)

International career^{‡}
2024–	Cambodia	10	(3)
Medal record
Men's football
Representing Cambodia
FIFA ASEAN Challenge Cup
Runner-up	2026 Hong Kong
- * Club domestic league appearances and goals as of 9 November 2026 ‡ National team caps and goals as of 5 October 2026

Rafael Andrés Nieto Rondón (born 29 April 1996) is a professional footballer who plays as an attacking midfielder for Visakha. Born in Colombia, he represents Cambodia at international level.

== Club career ==
Nieto has played in four countries, mostly in North America, South America, and Caribbean. In 2020, he joined Phnom Penh Crown of the Cambodian Premier League, becoming the first ever Colombian to do so.

== International goals ==
No.	Date	Venue	Opponent	Score	Result	Competition
1.	20 December 2024	Rajamangala Stadium, Bangkok, Thailand	Thailand	1–0	2–3	2024 ASEAN Championship
2.	30 September 2026	Kai Tak Stadium, Kowloon, Hong Kong	Timor-Leste	1–1	2–2	2026 FIFA ASEAN Cup
3.	30 September 2026	Kai Tak Stadium, Kowloon, Hong Kong	Timor-Leste	2–1	2–2	2026 FIFA ASEAN Cup

== Honours ==
Phnom Penh Crown

- Cambodian Premier League: 2021, 2022
- Hun Sen Cup: 2024–25
- Cambodian Super Cup: 2022, 2023
- Cambodian League Cup: 2022, 2023

Individual

- Cambodian Premier League Golden Boot: 2024–25 (joint)
- Cambodian Premier League Team of The Season: 2024–25
