= Ofufu Ibeh =

Nigerian footballer

Personal information
- Full name: Nnamdi Ofufu Ibeh
- Date of birth: 19 May 1998 (age 28)
- Place of birth: Aba, Nigeria
- Height: 1.67 m (5 ft 6 in)
- Position: Left winger

Team information
- Current team: Preah Khan Reach Svay Rieng
- Number: 30

Youth career
- 2015–2016: Remo Stars
- 2016: Beyond Limits Football Academy
- 2016–2017: C.D. Feirense

Senior career*
Years	Team	Apps	(Gls)
2017–2018	C.D. Feirense		
2017–2018	→ A.A. Avanca (loan)	18	(6)
2018–2021	S.C. Salgueiros	61	(23)
2021–2022	R.D. Águeda	10	(0)
2022	Apollon Larissa	0	(0)
2022	S.C. Praiense	10	(3)
2022–2023	C.D. Estarreja	18	(5)
2023–2024	Fgura United	24	(12)
2024–2025	Phnom Penh Crown	27	(14)
2025	Tarxien Rainbows	11	(1)
2026	Olympique Béja	6	(0)
2026–	Preah Khan Reach Svay Rieng	0	(0)
- * Club domestic league appearances and goals as of 8 September 2026

Nnamdi Ofufu Ibeh (born 19 May 1998) is a Nigerian professional football player who plays as a left winger for Preah Khan Reach Svay Rieng.

== Career ==
=== Fgura United ===
In 2023–2024 season, Ofufu played for Fgura United in Maltese Challenge League making 24 appearances and 12 goals.

=== Phnom Penh Crown ===
In June 2024, Ofufu signed for Phnom Penh Crown in Cambodian top division. Ofufu scored two goals in his Cambodian Premier League (CPL) debut against arch-rival Visakha on Saturday 10 August 2024 at Crown’s Smart RSN Stadium in the first week of the CPL season 2024–2025.
