= Mark Ajay Kurita =

Japanese footballer (born 1998)

Mark Ajay Kurita 栗田 マーク アジェイ
Personal information
- Date of birth: 7 March 1998 (age 28)
- Place of birth: Tokyo, Japan
- Height: 1.80 m (5 ft 11 in)
- Position: Forward

Team information
- Current team: Angkor Tiger
- Number: 9

Youth career
- Tamagawa SSS
- Tokyo SC
- 2013–2015: Tokyo Jitsugyo High School

College career
Years	Team	Apps	(Gls)
2016–2019	Shizuoka Sangyo University		

Senior career*
Years	Team	Apps	(Gls)
2020–2023	Kamatamare Sanuki	50	(7)
2022	→ Suzuka Point Getters (loan)	12	(1)
2024–2025	Bulleen Lions		
2025–	Angkor Tiger	28	(20)
- * Club domestic league appearances and goals as of 18 May 2026 (UTC)

Mark Ajay Kurita (栗田 マーク アジェイ, Kurita Māku Ajei; born 7 March 1998) is a Japanese footballer who plays forward for Angkor Tiger.

== Career statistics ==
=== Club ===
As of 10 November 2020.

Club	Season	League			National Cup		League Cup		Other		Total	
Club	Season	Division	Apps	Goals	Apps	Goals	Apps	Goals	Apps	Goals	Apps	Goals
Kamatamare Sanuki	2020	J3 League	21	4	0	0	–		0	0	21	4
Career total			21	4	0	0	0	0	0	0	21	4
