= Shori Murata =

Japanese footballer

Personal information
- Full name: Shori Murata
- Date of birth: 4 September 1993 (age 33)
- Place of birth: Yokohama, Japan
- Height: 1.72 m (5 ft 8 in)
- Position: Defensive midfielder

Youth career
- 2010–2012: Toko Gakuen High School

College career
Years	Team	Apps	(Gls)
2012–2015	Kanto Gakuin University		

Senior career*
Years	Team	Apps	(Gls)
2016	HBO Tokyo		
2016–2017	Lao Toyota		
2018–2019	Athletic 220		
2020	Yangon United		
2021	Persiraja Banda Aceh	15	(0)
2022	Young Elephants	11	(0)
2023–2026	Tiffy Army	82	(2)
- * Club domestic league appearances and goals as of 30 May 2026

Shori Murata (村田 勝利, Murata Shori; born 4 September 1993) is a Japanese professional footballer who plays as a defensive midfielder.

== Career statistics ==
=== Club ===
As of 20 August 2022

Club	Season	League			Cup		Continental		Total	
Club	Season	Division	Apps	Goals	Apps	Goals	Apps	Goals	Apps	Goals
Lao Toyota	2017	Lao Premier League	–		–		2 (Note: Appearances in AFC Cup qualifying)	0	2	0
Yangon United	2020	Myanmar National League	5	2	1	0	5 (Note: Two appearances in AFC Cup qualifying, three appearances in the AFC Cup)	0	11	2
Persiraja Banda Aceh	2021	Liga 1	15	0	–		0	0	15	0
Young Elephants	2022	Lao League 1	11	0	3	0	3	0	17	0
Career total			31	2	4	0	10	0	45	2
