= Lucas Dias (footballer, born 1997) =

Brazilian footballer

Personal information
- Full name: Lucas Dias do Nascimento Serafim
- Date of birth: 6 March 1997 (age 29)
- Place of birth: Rio de Janeiro, Brazil
- Height: 1.80 m (5 ft 11 in)
- Position: Winger

Team information
- Current team: Ayutthaya United
- Number: 7

Youth career
- –2016: Altos
- 2016: Confiança
- 2017: Pirin Blagoevgrad

Senior career*
Years	Team	Apps	(Gls)
2016	Altos	1	(0)
2017–2019	Bohemians 1905	1	(0)
2018	→ Kiryat Shmona (loan)	4	(0)
2019	→ SK Zápy (loan)	15	(0)
2019–2021	Vlašim	38	(5)
2021	Tsarsko Selo	19	(2)
2022–2023	Riteriai	21	(2)
2023	América de Natal	8	(0)
2023–2024	Al-Qaisumah	33	(5)
2024–2025	Uthai Thani	30	(3)
2025	PSM Makassar	9	(2)
2025–2026	Visakha	15	(4)
2026–	Ayutthaya United	1	(0)
- * Club domestic league appearances and goals as of 6 September 2026

Lucas Dias do Nascimento Serafim (born 6 March 1997), commonly known as Lucas Dias, is a Brazilian professional footballer plays as a winger for the Thai League 1 club Ayutthaya United. Besides Brazil, he has played in Bulgaria, Israel, the Czech Republic, Saudi Arabia, Thailand, and Indonesia.

== Career statistics ==
=== Club ===
As of 7 December 2019.

Club	Season	League			Cup		Other		Total	
Club	Season	Division	Apps	Goals	Apps	Goals	Apps	Goals	Apps	Goals
Altos	2016	–			0	0	1 (Note: Appearances in the Campeonato Piauiense)	0	1	0
Bohemians 1905	2017–18	Czech First League	1	0	0	0	0	0	1	0
Bohemians 1905	2018–19	Czech First League	0	0	0	0	0	0	0	0
Bohemians 1905	Total		1	0	0	0	0	0	1	0
Kiryat Shmona (loan)	2018–19	Israeli Premier League	4	0	4 (Note: Appearances in the Toto Cup)	0	0	0	8	0
SK Zápy (loan)	2018–19	Bohemian Football League	15	0	0	0	0	0	15	0
Vlašim	2019–20	Fortuna národní liga	13	2	0	0	0	0	13	2
Career total			33	2	4	0	1	0	38	2
