= Dida (footballer, born 1998) =

Brazilian footballer

Personal information
- Full name: Wagner Augusto Guimarães dos Santos
- Date of birth: 28 April 1998 (age 28)
- Place of birth: São Paulo, Brazil
- Height: 1.88 m (6 ft 2 in)
- Position: Goalkeeper

Team information
- Current team: MOI Kompong Dewa
- Number: 28

Youth career
- Atlética Portuguesa

Senior career*
Years	Team	Apps	(Gls)
2017	Jabaquara	1	(0)
2018	Elosport	12	(0)
2019	Jabaquara	5	(0)
2020	Mauá	8	(0)
2021	Tocantins	3	(0)
2021–2022	Fiães	31	(0)
2022–2024	Estrela	6	(0)
2024–2025	Madura United	14	(0)
2025	→ Malut United (loan)	15	(0)
2025–	MOI Kompong Dewa	33	(0)
- * Club domestic league appearances and goals as of 9 November 2026

Wagner Augusto Guimarães dos Santos (born 28 April 1998), simply known as Dida, is a Brazilian professional footballer who plays as a goalkeeper for Cambodian Premier League club MOI Kompong Dewa.

== Career ==
=== Portugal ===
Wagner Augusto signed for Estrela in 2022 becoming back up goalkeeper for another Brazilian, Bruno Brígido and made only 1 appearance in Liga Portugal 2 2022-23 season and his club got promoted to Primeira Liga after finished 3rd place in those season. After making 5 appearances in Portugal top flight league in 2023-24 seasons, he left the club in 2024 after spending two seasons.

=== Indonesia ===
Wagner Augusto signed for Madura United in 2024 and made 14 appearances in 2024–25 Liga 1 later he was sent on loan to another Indonesian side, Malut United and made another 15 appearances in the same competition.

=== Cambodia ===
He signed for MOI Kompong Dewa, previously known as Ministry of Interior FA, on 2 August 2025.
