= Angkor Tiger FC =

Association football club in Cambodia

Angkor Tiger អង្គរថាយហ្គឺរ
- Full name: Angkor Tiger Football Club
- Nickname: Temple Tigers
- Founded: 2012; 14 years ago as TriAsia Phnom Penh; 2015; 11 years ago as Cambodian Tiger; 2018; 8 years ago as Angkor Tiger
- Ground: Akihiro Kato Stadium
- Capacity: 2,000
- Owner: Akihiro Kato
- Head coach: Sotaro Yasunaga
- League: Cambodian Premier League
- 2025–26: Cambodian Premier League, 3rd of 11
- Website: angkor-tiger.com
Home colours	Away colours

Angkor Tiger Football Club (Khmer: ក្លឹបបាល់ទាត់អង្គរថាយហ្គឺរ, Klœ̆b Băltoăt Ângkôr Thayhkœr), formerly known as TriAsia Phnom Penh and Cambodian Tiger, is a Cambodian professional football club based in Siem Reap City, Siem Reap province. Founded in 2013 and refounded in 2015, the club plays in the Cambodian Premier League, the top tier of Cambodian football. The club is owned by the Japanese businessman Akihiro Kato.

== History ==
=== Foundation and early years (2012–2015) ===
The club originated as TriAsia Phnom Penh in 2012 and initially competed in Cambodian domestic football under its original name. The club initially operated in Phnom Penh before being acquired by Japanese businessman, Akihiro Kato in 2015. Following the change in ownership, it was renamed Cambodian Tiger Football Club. The club subsequently competed in the Cambodian League and the Hun Sen Cup, gradually establishing itself within Cambodian domestic football.

=== Relocation and rebranding (2017–2018) ===
In 2017, Cambodian Tiger relocated from Phnom Penh to Siem Reap, a city renowned for its proximity to Angkor Wat. The move was intended to establish the club in a new region and build a stronger connection with the local community. In 2018, Cambodian Tiger changed its name to Angkor Tiger Football Club, adopting an identity associated with Siem Reap and the Angkor region. The club continued competing in the Cambodian League and became one of the representatives of Siem Reap in the country's top division.

=== Establishment in the top division (2019–present) ===
Angkor Tiger finished fifth in the 2019 C-League recording 14 wins in 26 matches. The club remained competitive in subsequent seasons while Cambodian football underwent changes caused by the COVID-19 pandemic. It continued participating in the Cambodian League and domestic cup competitions, including the Hun Sen Cup, although it did not secure a major domestic trophy during this period.

Angkor Tiger continued competing in the Cambodian Premier League, finishing tenth in the 2023–24 season. During this period, the club maintained its focus on developing its squad and representing Siem Reap in the top flight.

Angkor Tiger improved its league position in the 2024–25 Cambodian Premier League season, finishing sixth out of eleven clubs. The campaign represented an improvement from the previous season's tenth-place finish. The club continued to compete against established sides such as Phnom Penh Crown, Boeung Ket, Visakha and Preah Khan Reach Svay Rieng as it sought to strengthen its position in Cambodian football.

Angkor Tiger competed in the 2025–26 Cambodian Premier League, continuing to play its home matches at the Akihiro Kato Stadium. The club remained part of the country's top-flight competition as it sought to build on its sixth-place finish in the previous season and establish greater consistency in domestic football.

Angkor Tiger was primarily established in 2013 as TriAsia Phnom Penh FC owned by TriAsia Group Co. Ltd based in Phnom Penh City. In 2015, TriAsia Group Co. Ltd sold the club to another businessman, Akihiro Kato, who changed the club name to Cambodian Tiger FC. The new president of the club saw the potential of Siem Reap province, so he relocated the club to Siem Reap province in 2017. After one year based in Siem Reap province, the club rebranded its name as Angkor Tiger FC, in which represents the city of Siem Reap, globally famous for the Angkor Wat temple. In August 2023, Indian holding company SkaSports acquired minority stakes in the club.

== Stadium ==
Since its establishment, Angkor Tiger played at Olympic Stadium until it moved to the Western Stadium in 2015 before finally moving back to Olympic Stadium for the 2016 season. With the new relocation of the club to Siem Reap province in 2017, the club played its home game at Svay Thom Stadium until it moved to SRU Stadium in 2020.

In October 2024, Angkor Tiger unveiled its new home stadium, the Akihiro Kato Stadium, named after the club's owner with an initial capacity of 2,000. The stadium hosted its first game on 10 November 2024.

=== Spectators ===
In 2018, at the Cambodia Football Award which was hosted by the Cambodian Football League, it won the award for the most popular club in Cambodia.

== Players ==
=== Current squad ===
Note: Flags indicate national team as defined under FIFA eligibility rules; some limited exceptions apply. Players may hold more than one non-FIFA nationality.

No.	Pos.	Nation	Player
1	GK	ESP	Arnau Riera
2	DF	CAM	Han Ty
3	DF	CAM	Yang Phumin
4	DF	CAM	Im Vakhim (vice-captain)
7	FW	GER	Stephan Mensah
8	MF	SRB	Irfan Zulfic
10	FW	SSD	Manny Aguek
11	FW	JPN	Mikhael Akatsuka
13	GK	CAM	Chea Vansak
14	DF	CAM	Tum Makara
16	FW	CAM	Sou Menghong
17	MF	CAM	Sokry Sofan

No.	Pos.	Nation	Player
19	FW	CAM	Chanvibol Davit
20	MF	CAM	Ly Sosea
22	GK	CAM	Yi Bunheng
23	MF	CAM	Koy Noraksakada
24	DF	CAM	Chhom Sokhay
26	DF	CAM	Moth Sattya
27	DF	CAM	Nu Chenmakara
39	DF	JPN	Takuto Yasuoka (captain)
42	MF	CAM	Hort Chhenchen
71	GK	CAM	You Panha
87	DF	NED	Ruben Hoogenhout
88	MF	CAM	Oung Kimsou

== Management and staff ==
Position	Staff
President	(Japan) Akihiro Kato
General manager	(Japan) Yusuke Shinoda
General Secretary	(Cambodia) Oum karona
Marketing Manager	(Japan) Kiyone Takahisa
Sale Manager	(Japan) Taiga Shoji
Marketing Assistant	(Cambodia) Teng Sreyleakna
Team manager	(Cambodia) Sok Dara
Head coach	(Japan) Sotaro Yasunaga
Assistant coach	(Japan) Kota Miyagi
Physiotherapist	(Brazil) Daniel Tavares
Assistant physiotherapist	(Cambodia) Kun Tol
Kit man	(Cambodia) Men Vicheka
Finance and Admin	(Cambodia) Heap Vandy
General Assistant	(Cambodia) Vann Chomrong
Assistant Finance and Admin	(Cambodia) Dan Kimhouy
Photographer	(Cambodia) Dorn Dom
Videographer	(Cambodia) Sitha Kimhong
Graphic Designer	(Cambodia) Sen Bunhour
Social Media admin	(Cambodia) Sok Rathana

== Award winners ==
=== Domestic ===
- Team of the Season
  - (Japan) Takuto Yasuoka (2025–26)
  - (Japan) Mark Ajay Kurita (2025–26)

== Notable players ==
=== International capped players ===
AFC/OFC.: (Afghanistan) Moshtaq Ahmadi; (Philippines) Pocholo Bugas; (Singapore) Delwinder Singh; (Timor-Leste) João Pedro; (Timor-Leste) Mouzinho	CAF.: (South Sudan) Manny Aguek	UEFA.: (Belarus) Maksim Taleyko; (Germany) Stephan Mensah; (Republic of Ireland) Jozsef Keaveny; (Netherlands) Ruben Hoogenhout	CONMEBOL/ CONCACAF.: (Canada) Alessandro Riggi

== Managerial history ==
Name	Period	Achievements
(Japan) Daisuke Yoshioka	2013–2015	
(Japan) Masakazu Kihara	2015–2016	
(Cambodia) Hok Sochivorn	2016–2017	
(Japan) Kenichi Yatsuhashi	2017	
(Spain) Oriol Mohedano	2017–2021	
(England) Alistair Heath	2021–2023	
(Cambodia) Ny Yuth (caretaker)	2023–2024	
(Japan) Kota Miyagi	2024–2025	
(Japan) Sotaro Yasunaga	2025–present	
