= Tiago Alves (footballer, born 1996) =

Portuguese footballer

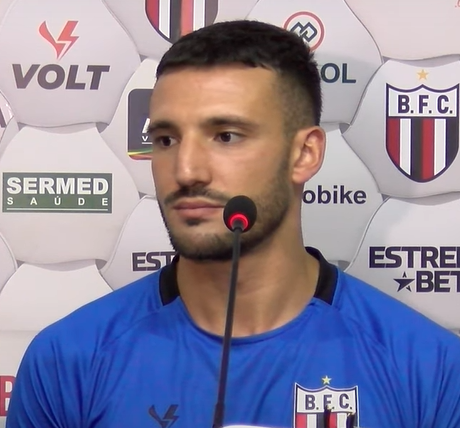
- Alves with Botafogo-SP in 2024

Personal information
- Full name: Tiago Alexandre Mendes Alves
- Date of birth: 19 June 1996 (age 30)
- Place of birth: Coimbra, Portugal
- Height: 1.77 m (5 ft 9 1/2 in)
- Position: Forward

Team information
- Current team: Preah Khan Reach Svay Rieng
- Number: 7

Youth career
- 2004–2006: Avelarense
- 2006–2011: Sporting
- 2011–2013: Académica
- 2014–2015: União Coimbra
- 2014–2015: Belenenses

Senior career*
Years	Team	Apps	(Gls)
2015–2016	Varzim B	17	(3)
2016–2017	Varzim	14	(2)
2017–2018	Salgueiros	14	(2)
2018–2019	Belenenses SAD B	17	(1)
2019	Olimpia Grudziądz	18	(6)
2019–2022	Piast Gliwice	40	(5)
2022–2023	Montedio Yamagata	67	(24)
2024	Botafogo-SP	7	(0)
2024	Tokyo Verdy	10	(1)
2025	Kerala Blasters		
2026–	Preah Khan Reach Svay Rieng	3	(1)
- * Club domestic league appearances and goals as of 9 November 2026

Tiago Alexandre Mendes Alves (born 19 June 1996) is a Portuguese professional footballer who plays as a forward for Cambodian Premier League club Preah Khan Reach Svay Rieng.

== Club career ==
On 31 July 2016, Alves made his professional debut with Varzim in a 2016–17 Taça da Liga match against Olhanense.

In March 2024, Alves joined J1 League club Tokyo Verdy. After making 12 appearances, he left the club at the end of the 2024 season.

In January 2026, Alves joined Cambodian Premier League club Preah Khan Reach Svay Rieng.

== Honors ==
Preah Khan Reach Svay Rieng

- Cambodian Premier League: 2025–26
- AFC Challenge League runner-up: 2025–26
