= Breno Caetano =

Brazilian footballer

Breninho
Personal information
- Full name: Breno Caetano de Souza
- Date of birth: 11 March 1997 (age 29)
- Place of birth: Rio Pomba, Brazil
- Height: 1.77 m (5 ft 10 in)
- Position: Winger

Team information
- Current team: Preah Khan Reach Svay Rieng

Youth career
- 2015–2017: Fénix

Senior career*
| Years | Team | Apps | (Gls) |
| 2017–2019 | Fénix | 53 | (3) |
| 2020 | Imperatriz | 7 | (0) |
| 2021 | Guarany Sporting Club | 6 | (0) |
| 2021 | Atlético Metropolitano | 5 | (0) |
| 2021 | Bahia de Feira | 12 | (1) |
| 2022 | Afogados | 26 | (1) |
| 2023 | Atlética de Altos | 2 | (0) |
| 2023 | → Aymorés (loan) | 14 | (3) |
| 2023–2024 | Fénix | 27 | (0) |
| 2025 | Preah Khan Reach Svay Rieng | | |
| 2025 | Visakha | 8 | (1) |
| 2025–2026 | → Phnom Penh Crown (loan) | | |
| 2026– | → Preah Khan Reach Svay Rieng (loan) | | |
- * Club domestic league appearances and goals

Breno Caetano de Souza (born 11 March 1997), normally known as Breninho is a Brazilian professional footballer who plays as a winger.

== Career ==
=== Fénix ===
He was Fénix youth in Uruguay from 2015 to 2017 and was promoted to senior team in 2017. He left the club in 2019 after making 53 appearances and scored 3 goals. He return to his childhood club in 2023.

=== Preah Khan Reach Svay Rieng ===
In February 2025, he signed for Cambodian Premier League champion Preah Khan Reach Svay Rieng however he only registered for 2024–25 AFC Challenge League made 5 appearances and scored 1 goal in this competition. He was part of the club history to secured runner up place in AFC Challenge League after losing to Turkmenistan champion FK Arkadag 1–2 in extra-time.

=== Visakha ===
After leaving PKR Svay Rieng in June 2025, he signed for another Cambodian local club Visakha a head of 2025-26 Cambodian Premier League season however he suffered an injury during the first games of the season against Royal Cambodian Armed Forces.

=== Phnom Penh Crown ===
On 25 December 2025, he was announced on loan to the most successful football club in Cambodia, Phnom Penh Crown after completed half season with Visakha.

== Honours ==
Preah Khan Reach Svay Rieng

- AFC Challenge League runner-up: 2024–25
