= Bruno Ernandes =

Brazilian footballer (born 1999)

Personal information
- Full name: Bruno Ernandes da Silva Lemos
- Date of birth: 1 July 1999 (age 27)
- Place of birth: Rio de Janeiro, Brazil
- Height: 1.85 m (6 ft 1 in)
- Position: Centre-forward

Team information
- Current team: Life Sihanoukville
- Number: 99

Youth career
- 2017–2018: Vitória de Guimarães
- 2018–2019: EC São Bernardo
- 2019: Cuiabá

Senior career*
Years	Team	Apps	(Gls)
2019	Cuiabá	0	(0)
2020	Azuriz	6	(0)
2021–2022	Hirnyk-Sport Horishni Plavni	6	(0)
2022	URT	1	(0)
2022	São Gonçalo Esporte Clube	9	(1)
2023	Desportivo Brasil	1	(0)
2023	Independente Esporte Clube	10	(3)
2023–2025	KF Shkumbini Peqin	11	(2)
2025	Porto Velho	9	(1)
2025	Dom Bosco		
2025–2026	ISI Dangkor Senchey	26	(8)
2026–	Life Sihanoukville	6	(5)
- * Club domestic league appearances and goals as of 9 November 2026

Bruno Ernandes da Silva Lemos (born 1 July 1999), known as Bruno Ernandes, is a Brazilian professional footballer who plays as a centre-forward for the Cambodian Premier League club Life Sihanoukville .
