= Takuto Yasuoka =

Japanese association football player

Personal information
- Full name: Takuto Yasuoka
- Date of birth: 29 October 1996 (age 30)
- Place of birth: Kawanishi, Hyōgo, Japan
- Height: 1.77 m (5 ft 10 in)
- Position: Midfielder

Team information
- Current team: Angkor Tiger
- Number: 39

Youth career
- 2011–2013: Hōtoku Gakuen High School

Senior career*
Years	Team	Apps	(Gls)
2015	Berane	2	(0)
2016	Ibar		
2016	Grafičar		
2017	OFK Beograd	8	(0)
2017–2020	Linköping City	95	(10)
2021–2022	Vasalund	23	(1)
2023–	Angkor Tiger	65	(7)
- * Club domestic league appearances and goals as of 9 November 2026

Takuto Yasuoka (安岡 拓斗, Yasuoka Takuto; born 29 October 1996) is a Japanese professional footballer who plays as a midfielder for Cambodian Premier League club Angkor Tiger.

== Career statistics ==
=== Club ===
As of 28 March 2021.

Club	Season	League			Cup		Other		Total	
Club	Season	Division	Apps	Goals	Apps	Goals	Apps	Goals	Apps	Goals
Berane	2014–15	Montenegrin First League	2	0	0	0	0	0	2	0
OFK Beograd	2016–17	Serbian First League	8	0	0	0	0	0	8	0
Linköping City	2017	Division 2 Södra Svealand	9	1	0	0	0	0	9	1
Linköping City	2018	Division 1 Norra	29	2	0	0	0	0	29	2
Linköping City	2019	Division 1 Norra	29	4	0	0	0	0	29	4
Linköping City	2020	Ettan Södra	28	3	0	0	0	0	28	3
Linköping City	Total		95	10	0	0	0	0	95	10
Vasalund	2021	Superettan	23	1	0	0	0	0	0	0
Career total			105	10	0	0	0	0	105	10
