= Mat Noron =

Cambodian footballer

Personal information
- Full name: Mat Noron
- Date of birth: 17 June 1998 (age 28)
- Place of birth: Phnom Penh, Cambodia
- Position: Forward

Team information
- Current team: Boeung Ket
- Number: 10

Youth career
- 2011–2014: Phnom Penh Crown

Senior career*
Years	Team	Apps	(Gls)
2016	Anachak Baitong		
2017–2018	Électricité du Cambodge		
2019–	Boeung Ket	107	(53)

International career^{‡}
2018–	Cambodia	15	(0)
- * Club domestic league appearances and goals as of 20:12, 12 September 2026 (UTC) ‡ National team caps and goals as of 12:04, 19 August 2026 (UTC)

Mat Noron (born 17 June 1998) is a Cambodian professional footballer who plays as a forward for Cambodian Premier League club Boeung Ket and the Cambodia national team.

== Career statistics ==
=== International ===
As of matches played 29 December 2022.

National team	Year	Apps	Goals
Cambodia	2018	1	0
Cambodia	2021	2	0
Cambodia	2022	8	0
Total		11	0
