= 2008 Hun Sen Cup =

Tournament details
- Country: Cambodia
- Teams: 28

Final positions
- Champions: Phnom Penh Empire
- Runners-up: Preah Khan Reach

Tournament statistics
- Top goal scorer: Sok Chanraksmey (12 goals)

Hun Sen Cup is the main football knockout tournament in Cambodia. The 2008 Hun Sen Cup was the 2nd season of the Hun Sen Cup, the premier knockout tournament for association football clubs in Cambodia involving Cambodian League and provincial teams organized by the Football Federation of Cambodia.

Khemara Keila FC were the defending champions, having beaten Nagacorp 4–2 on penalty shoot-out after extra time 1–1 in the previous season's final.

== Group stage ==
Teams qualified to the Round of 16:

- Group A: Kirivong Sok Sen Chey, Build Bright University, Sihanoukville FC
- Group B: Nagacorp FC, Phuchung Neak FC,
- Group C: Khemara Keila FC, Moha Garuda FC, Pursat FC
- Group D: Phnom Penh Empire, Preah Khan Reach
- Group E: Spark FC, Baksey Chamkrong FC (Siem Reap), Phnom Pros FC
- Group F: Lion FC, National Defense Ministry FC, Kampong Speu FC

== Round of 16 ==
9 Feb 2008

Nagacorp	17– 2	Pursat

9 Feb 2008

Lion FC	4– 3	Phnom Pros FC

16 Feb 2008

Phnom Penh Empire	6– 0	Baksey Chamkrong FC
Chan Rithy 8'; Keo Sokngon 24', 40', 82'; Chan Chhaya 75', 86'

16 Feb 2008

Build Bright University	2– 0	Moha Garuda
Nnandi Sylester Ahiem 5'; Um Chan Dara 52'

23 Feb 2008

Khemara Keila	8– 0	Sihanoukville FC
Kouch Sokumpheak 28', 42', 88'; Ty Bun Vichet 31', 88'; Ung Kan Yanith 37'; Loch Ratha 83'; Akpueze Kenneth 85'

23 Feb 2008

Preah Khan Reach	4– 1	Phuchung Neak
Egbebuey Stanley 16', 76'; Khoun Laboravy 51'; Tuy Sam 31' (o.g.)		Koua Mpoko 22'

24 Feb 2008

National Defense	2– 0	Spark FC
Sin Dalin 54'; Sok Pheng 66'

24 Feb 2008

Kirivong Sok Sen Chey	12– 1	Kampong Speu
Mam Sophal 2', 16'; In Vichhika 17'; Tuon Phiarum 25'; Mit Attrey 35', 42'; Haydang 67', 73', 75', 81', 86', 89'		Sok Channa 47'

== Quarter-finals ==
22 March 2008

Nagacorp	1– 2	Phnom Penh Empire
Chego Tkapi 90+'		Chan Rithy 42'; Samuel Ajayi 43'

22 March 2008

Build Bright University	2– 0	Lion FC
N.S. Ahiem 8'; Prom Put Sithy 42'

23 March 2008

Preah Khan Reach	1– 0	Kirivong Sok Sen Chey
Nuth Sinuon 90+1'

23 March 2008

Khemara Keila	1– 0	National Defense
Panji William 90'

== Semi-finals ==
29 March 2008

Phnom Penh Empire	4– 1	Build Bright University

29 March 2008

Preah Khan Reach	0– 0 (a.e.t.)	Khemara Keila
Penalties
	5-4

== Third place play-off ==
5 April 2008

Build Bright United	3– 2	Khemara Keila FC
Sem Bunny 61'; Saidu Zila Sani 64'; Nnandi Sylester Ahiem 88'		Kouch Sokumpheak 4'; Akpueze Kenneth 90+'

== Final ==
5 April 2008

Phnom Penh Empire	1– 0	Preah Khan Reach
Anucha Chuaisri 49'

== Awards ==
- Top Goal Scorers: Sok Chanraksmey of Spark FC (12 goals)
- Goalkeeper of the Season: Ouk Mic of Preah Khan Reach
- Fair Play:Preah Khan Reach

== See also ==
- 2008 Cambodian League
- Cambodian League
- Hun Sen Cup
