= 2010 Hun Sen Cup =

Tournament details
- Country: Cambodia
- Teams: 34

Final positions
- Champions: National Defense
- Runner-up: Phnom Penh Crown

Tournament statistics
- Top goal scorer(s): Kouch Sokumpheak, Srey Veasna (20 goals)

The 2010 Hun Sen Cup was the 4th season of the Hun Sen Cup, the premier knockout tournament for association football clubs in Cambodia involving Cambodian League and provincial teams organized by the Football Federation of Cambodia.

Phnom Penh Crown were the defending champions, having beaten Nagacorp FC 1–0 in the previous season's final.

== Group stage ==
The matches were arranged in four regions, with two groups in each region. The teams finishing in the top two positions in each of the eight groups in Group stage progressed to the Round of 16 in Phnom Penh.

Groups A and B in Battambang

Groups C and D in Siem Reap

Groups E and F in Kep

Groups G and H in Svay Rieng

=== Group A ===
Pos.	Team	GP	W	D	L	GF	GA	GD	Pts
1	Phnom Penh Crown	4	4	0	0	26	0	26	12
2	Rithy Sen	4	3	0	1	21	2	19	9
3	Battambang Province FC	4	2	0	2	9	10	-1	6
4	Pailin Province FC	4	1	0	3	6	20	-14	3
5	Banteay Meanchey	4	0	0	4	2	32	-30	0

7 January 2010	Banteay Meanchey	1–12	Rithy Sen
7 January 2010	Phnom Penh Crown	4–0	Battambang
9 January 2010	Pailin	0–7	Phnom Penh Crown
9 January 2010	Battambang	3–1	Banteay Meanchey
11 January 2010	Phnom Penh Crown	1–0	Rithy Sen
11 January 2010	Battambang	6–3	Pailin
13 January 2010	Rithy Sen	7–0	Pailin
13 January 2010	Banteay Meanchey	0–14	Phnom Penh Crown
15 January 2010	Banteay Meanchey	0–3	Pailin
15 January 2010	Rithy Sen	2–0	Battambang

=== Group B ===
Pos.	Team	GP	W	D	L	GF	GA	GD	Pts
1	Mekong Kampuchea	3	3	0	0	7	3	4	9
2	National Defense	3	2	0	1	9	4	5	6
3	Pursat Province FC	3	1	0	2	6	9	-3	3
4	Kampong Chhnang	3	0	0	3	3	9	-6	0

8 January 2010	Mekong Kampuchea	3–1	Pursat
8 January 2010	Kampong Chhnang	0–4	National Defense
10 January 2010	National Defense	4–2	Pursat
10 January 2010	Kampong Chhnang	1–2	Mekong Kampuchea
12 January 2010	Mekong Kampuchea	2–1	National Defense
12 January 2010	Kampong Chhnang	2–3	Pursat

=== Group C ===
Pos.	Team	GP	W	D	L	GF	GA	GD	Pts
1	Build Bright United	3	2	1	0	9	0	+9	7
2	Prek Pra Keila	3	2	1	0	5	2	+3	7
3	Preah Vihear Province FC	3	1	0	2	5	11	-6	3
4	Tor Kraham	3	0	0	3	2	8	-6	0

7 January 2010	Tor Kraham	0–2	Prek Pra Keila
7 January 2010	Preah Vihear	0–6	Build Bright United
9 January 2010	Build Bright United	0–0	Prek Pra Keila
9 January 2010	Preah Vihear	3–2	Tor Kraham
11 January 2010	Tor Kraham	0–3	Build Bright United
11 January 2010	Preah Vihear	2–3	Prek Pra Keila

=== Group D ===
Pos.	Team	GP	W	D	L	GF	GA	GD	Pts
1	Naga Corp	3	3	0	0	24	4	+20	9
2	Oddar Meanchey	3	2	0	1	8	6	+2	6
3	Siem Reap Province FC	3	0	1	2	2	8	-6	1
4	Kampong Thom Province	3	0	1	2	1	17	-16	1

8 January 2010	Oddar Meanchey	2–5	Nagacorp
8 January 2010	Siem Reap	0–0	Kampong Thom
10 January 2010	Nagaworld	12–0	KampongThom
10 January 2010	Siem Reap	0–1	Oddar Meanchey
12 January 2010	Kompong Thom	1–5	Oddar Meanchey
12 January 2010	Nagacorp	7–2	Siem Reap

=== Group E ===
Pos.	Team	GP	W	D	L	GF	GA	GD	Pts
1	Kirivong Sok Sen Chey	3	2	1	0	8	1	7	7
2	Phuchung Neak	3	2	1	0	7	2	5	7
3	Life University FC	3	0	1	2	2	4	-2	1
4	Kampot Province FC	3	0	1	2	3	13	-10	1

8 January 2010	Kampot	1–1	Life University
8 January 2010	Kirivong Sok Sen Chey	0–0	Phuchung Neak
10 January 2010	Phuchung Neak	1–0	Life University
10 January 2010	Kirivong Sok Sen Chey	6–0	Kampot
12 January 2010	Kampot	2–6	Phuchung Neak
12 January 2010	Kirivong Sok Sen Chey	2–1	Life University

=== Group F ===
Pos.	Team	GP	W	D	L	GF	GA	GD	Pts
1	Koh Kong Province FC	4	4	0	0	13	2	11	12
2	Wat Phnom FC	4	3	0	1	16	4	12	9
3	Kang Reach Sey FC	4	2	0	2	6	5	1	6
4	Kep Province FC	4	1	0	3	4	9	-5	3
5	Post Tel Club	4	0	0	4	2	21	-19	0

7 January 2010	Kang Reach Sey	0–1	Wat Phnom FC
7 January 2010	Post Tel Club	1–2	Kep
9 January 2010	Koh Kong	6–0	Post Tel Club
9 January 2010	Kep	1–2	Kang Reach Sey
11 January 2010	Post Tel Club	0–9	Wat Phnom FC
11 January 2010	Kep	0–2	Koh Kong
13 January 2010	Wat Phnom FC	2–3	Koh Kong
13 January 2010	Kang Reach Sey	4–1	Post Tel Club
15 January 2010	Kang Reach Sey	0–2	Koh Kong
15 January 2010	Wat Phnom FC	4–1	Kep

=== Group G ===
Pos.	Team	GP	W	D	L	GF	GA	GD	Pts
1	Khemara Keila	3	3	0	0	28	0	+28	9
2	Prey Veng Province FC	3	2	0	1	5	7	-2	6
3	Kandal Province FC	3	1	0	2	2	10	-8	3
4	Arizon Cambodia FC	3	0	0	3	1	19	-18	0

8 January 2010	Arizon Cambodia	0–1	Kandal
8 January 2010	Prey Veng	0–5	Khemara Keila FC
10 January 2010	Khemara Keila FC	8–0	Kandal
10 January 2010	Prey Veng	3–1	Arizon Cambodia
12 January 2010	Arizon	0–15	Khemara Keila FC
12 January 2010	Prey Veng	2–1	Kandal

=== Group H ===
Pos.	Team	GP	W	D	L	GF	GA	GD	Pts
1	Preah Khan Reach	3	3	0	0	22	7	+15	9
2	Svay Rieng Province FC	3	2	0	1	18	5	+13	6
3	BB World FC	3	1	0	2	10	8	2	3
4	Kratie Province FC	3	0	0	3	3	33	-30	0

7 January 2010	Svay Rieng	12–1	Kratie
7 January 2010	Preah Khan Reach	4–3	BB World
9 January 2010	Kratie	1–7	BB World
9 January 2010	Svay Rieng	3–4	Preah Khan Reach
11 January 2010	Kratie	1–14	Preah Khan Reach
11 January 2010	Svay Rieng	3–0	BB World

== Round of 16 ==
30 January 2010

Phnom Penh Crown	1– 0	Phuchung Neak
Heng Sok Ly 85'

30 January 2010

Mekong Kampuchea University FC	1– 10	Wat Phnom FC
Em Theakneak 18'		Tes Vatanak 4'; Puth Savuth 9'; Ry Phearoeun 41', 81', 85'; Leang Sok Samnang 49'; Phlong Chanthou 51'; Srey Vandeth 66', 67', 72'

31 January 2010

Build Bright United	7– 0	Prey Veng Province FC
Prum Puth Sethy 5', 11', 85'; Sophat Chansokunthina 18'; Oum Chandara 28', 43'; In Vireak 38'

31 January 2010

Naga Corp	6– 2	Svay Rieng Province FC
Sun Sovannarith 31', 90+1'; Teab Vathanak 52', 82', 89'; Oum Thavarak 76'		Meak Chhordaravuth 28'; Pov Phearith 71'

6 February 2010

Kirivong Sok Sen Chey	2– 4 (a.e.t.)	Rithy Sen
Hok Sochivoan 31'; Phan Vanda 57'		Ouk Channarith 38'; Keo Chandara 90+2', 110'; Pes Matsum 103'

6 February 2010

Koh Kong Province FC	0– 0	National Defense
Penalties
	3-4

7 February 2010

Khemara Keila FC	5– 0	PreK Pra Keila
Sophal Udom 40', 53', 90+2'; Ty Bunvicheth 64', 74'

7 February 2010

Preah Khan Reach	5– 0	Oddar Meanchey Province FC
Sam El Nasa 43,'; Heng Saravuth 72', 84'; Khoun Laboravy 78' ? ?'

== Quarter-finals ==
20 February 2010

Phnom Penh Crown	5– 1	Wat Phnom FC
Tieng Tiny 14', 34'; Hong Ratana 65'; Heng Sokly 73'; Srey Veasna 73'		Ry Pharoeun 73'

20 February 2010

Naga Corp	6– 0	Build Bright United
Sovannarith 18', 39'; Teab Vathanak 47', 69', 72', 86'

21 February 2010

Rithy Sen	1– 9	National Defense
Ky Rohan 57'		Khim Borey 38'; Thong Udom 40', 42'; Phuong Soksana 56', 70', 90+1'; Sin Dalin 80', 83', 85'

21 February 2010

Preah Khan Reach	3– 0	Khemara Keila FC
Sam El Nasa 15', 90'; Sok Chan Rasmey 55'

== Semi-finals ==
27 February 2010

National Defense	1– 0	Preah Khan Reach
Oum Kumpheak 27'

27 February 2010

Phnom Penh Crown	3– 3 (a.e.t.)	Naga Corp
Sokngon 14', 19'; Chan Chhaya 22'		Choek Sokhom 55'; Sovannarith 75'; Kim Chanbunrith 88'
Penalties
	4–3

== Third place play-off ==
6 March 2010

Preah Khan Reach	3– 2	Naga Corp
Sam El Nasa 60'; Laboravy 72'; Hieng Saravuth 79'		Kop Isa 15', 18'

== Final ==
7 February 2010

Phnom Penh Crown	2– 3	National Defense
Heng Sokly 39'; Chan Rithy 89'		Sin Dalin 26'; Chhin Chhoeun 65'; Thong Udom 90+3'

Hun Sen Cup 2010 Champions

National Defense Ministry
1st Title

== Awards ==
- Top goal scorers: Kouch Sokumpheak of Khemara Keila FC, Srey Veasna of Phnom Penh Crown FC (20 goals)
- Goalkeeper of the Season: Peng Bunchhay of Phnom Penh Crown FC
- Fair play: Preah Khan Reach

== See also ==
- 2010 Cambodian League
- Cambodian League
- Hun Sen Cup
