= 2009 Hun Sen Cup =

Tournament details
- Country: Cambodia
- Teams: 33

Final positions
- Champions: Phnom Penh Crown
- Runners-up: Nagacorp

Tournament statistics
- Top goal scorer: Kouch Sokumpheak (21 goals)

The Hun Sen Cup is the main football knockout tournament in Cambodia. The 2009 Hun Sen Cup was the 3rd season of the Hun Sen Cup, the premier knockout tournament for association football clubs in Cambodia involving Cambodian League and provincial teams organized by the Football Federation of Cambodia.

Phnom Penh Crown were the defending champions, having beaten Preah Khan Reach 1–0 in the previous season's final.

== Group stage ==
The matches were arranged in four regions, two groups in each region. The teams finishing in the top two positions in each of the eight groups in Group stage progressed to the Round of 16 playing in Phnom Penh.

- Group A and B in Takéo
- Group C and D in Kampong Chhnang
- Group E and F in Kampong Cham
- Group G and H in Banteay Meanchey

=== Group A ===
Pos.	Team	GP	W	D	L	GF	GA	GD	Pts
1	Kirivong Sok Sen Chey	4	4	0	0	21	1	20	12
2	Sihanoukville Port	4	3	0	1	12	7	5	9
3	Samnang Aphivath	4	1	1	2	16	18	-2	4
4	Kandal Province FC	4	1	0	3	5	19	-14	3
5	Kep Province FC	4	0	1	3	5	14	-9	1

7 January 2009	Sihanoukville	5–1	Kep
7 January 2009	Samnang Aphivath	12–2	Kandal
8 January 2009	Sihanoukville	4–0	Samnang Aphivath
8 January 2009	Kirivong Sok Sen Chey	4–1	Kandal
10 January 2009	Samnang Aphivath	0–8	Kirivong Sok Sen Chey
10 January 2009	Kandal	1–0	Kep
12 January 2009	Kandal	1–3	Sihanoukville
12 January 2009	Kep	0–4	Kirivong Sok Sen Chey
14 January 2009	Kirivong Sok Sen Chey	5–0	Sihanoukville
14 January 2009	Samnang Aphivath	4–4	Kep

=== Group B ===
Pos.	Team	GP	W	D	L	GF	GA	GD	Pts
1	Phnom Penh Crown	3	3	0	0	13	0	13	9
2	Kampot Province FC	3	2	0	1	9	4	5	6
3	Mekong Kampuchea	3	1	0	2	2	5	-3	3
4	CMAC FC	3	0	0	3	1	13	-12	0

9 January 2009	Phnom Penh Crown	4–0	Kampot
9 January 2009	Mekong Kampuchea	2–1	CMAC FC
10 January 2009	Phnom Penh Crown	7–0	CMAC FC
10 January 2009	Kampot	2–0	Mekong Kampuchea
13 January 2009	CMAC FC	0–4	Kampot
13 January 2009	Phnom Penh Crown	2–0	Mekong Kampuchea

=== Group C ===
Pos.	Team	GP	W	D	L	GF	GA	GD	Pts
1	Preah Khan Reach	3	3	0	0	9	0	9	9
2	Life University FC	3	2	0	1	8	8	0	6
3	Kampong Chhnang	3	0	1	2	3	6	-3	1
4	Kang Reach Sey FC	3	0	1	3	3	9	-6	1

7 January 2009	Preah Khan Reach	3–0	Kang Reach Sey
7 January 2009	Kampong Chhnang	2–3	Life University
9 January 2009	Preah Khan Reach	4–0	Life University
9 January 2009	Kang Reach Sey	1–1	Kampong Chhnang
11 January 2009	Preah Khan Reach	2–0	Kampong Chhnang
11 January 2009	Life University	5–2	Kang Reach Sey

=== Group D ===
Pos.	Team	GP	W	D	L	GF	GA	GD	Pts
1	Post Tel Club	3	3	0	0	9	0	9	9
2	Koh Kong Province FC	3	1	1	1	3	3	0	4
3	Kampong Speu Province	3	1	0	2	2	6	-4	3
4	Prey Veng Province FC	3	0	1	2	2	7	-5	0

8 January 2009	Post Tel Club	4–0	Prey Veng
8 January 2009	Kampong Speu	0–2	Koh Kong
10 January 2009	Koh Kong	0–2	Post Tel Club
10 January 2009	Prey Veng	1–2	Kampong Speu
12 January 2009	Koh Kong	1–1	Prey Veng
12 January 2009	Post Tel Club	3–0	Kanpong Speu

=== Group E ===
Pos.	Team	GP	W	D	L	GF	GA	GD	Pts
1	Phuchung Neak	3	2	1	0	5	1	4	7
2	Build Bright United	3	1	2	0	1	0	1	5
3	Kampong Cham Province	3	0	2	1	2	3	-1	2
4	Svay Rieng Province FC	3	0	1	2	1	5	-4	1

7 January 2009	Build Bright United	1–0	Svay Rieng Province
7 January 2009	Kampong Cham	1–2	Phuchung Neak
9 January 2009	Build Bright United	0–0	Phuchung Neak
9 January 2009	Svay Rieng Province	1–1	Kampong Cham
11 January 2009	Phuchung Neak	3–0	Svay Rieng Province
11 January 2009	Build Bright United	0–0	Kampong Cham

=== Group F ===
Pos.	Team	GP	W	D	L	GF	GA	GD	Pts
1	National Defense	3	3	0	0	8	0	8	9
2	Prek Pra Keila	3	2	0	1	4	4	0	6
3	Spark FC	3	1	0	2	3	3	0	3
4	Kampong Thom Province	3	0	0	3	1	9	-8	0

8 January 2009	National Defense	3–0	Kampong Thom
8 January 2009	Spark FC	0–1	Prek Pra Keila
10 January 2009	Prek Pra Keila	0–3	National Defense
10 January 2009	Kampong Thom	0–3	Spark FC
12 January 2009	National Defense	2–0	Spark FC
12 January 2009	Prek Pra Keila	3–1	Kampong Thom

=== Group G ===
Pos.	Team	GP	W	D	L	GF	GA	GD	Pts
1	Ranger FC	3	3	0	0	32	3	29	9
2	Banteay Meanchey	3	2	0	1	11	8	3	6
3	Siem Reap Province FC	3	1	0	2	11	7	4	3
4	Preah Vihear Province FC	3	0	0	3	0	36	-36	0

7 January 2009	Ranger FC	20–0	Preah Vihear
7 January 2009	Banteay Meanchey	2–1	Siem Reap
9 January 2009	Ranger FC	5–1	Siem Reap
9 January 2009	Preah Vihear	0–7	Banteay Meanchey
11 January 2009	Ranger FC	7–2	Banteay Meanchey
11 January 2009	Siem Reap	9–0	Preah Vihear

=== Group H ===
Pos.	Team	GP	W	D	L	GF	GA	GD	Pts
1	Nagacorp	3	3	0	0	27	0	27	9
2	Battambang Province FC	3	2	0	1	10	11	-1	6
3	Pailin Province FC	3	1	0	2	3	13	-10	3
4	Oddar Meanchey	3	0	0	3	3	19	-16	0

8 January 2009	Nagacorp	8–0	Battambang
8 January 2009	Pailin	2–1	Oddar Meanchey
10 January 2009	Oddar Meanchey	0–9	Nagacorp
10 January 2009	Battambang	2–1	Pailin
12 January 2009	Nagacorp	10–0	Pailin
12 January 2009	Battambang	8–2	Oddar Meanchey

== Round of 16 ==
24 Jan 2009

Kirivong Sok Sen Chey	2– 2 (a.e.t.)	Build Bright United
O.J. Chukwuma 3', 30'		Proum Putsithi 41'; Sem Bunny 65'
Penalties
	3-5

24 Jan 2009

Phnom Penh Crown	7– 0	Prek Pra Keila
Nuth Sinuon 6', 61'; Sun Sophana 20', 50'; Chan Rithy 27'; Hong Ratana 75'; Lor Pech Seyha 81'

31 Jan 2009

Preah Khan Reach	6– 2	Banteay Meanchey
Sam El Nasa 10'; Khoun Laboravy 44', 58'; Hok Sochetra 45'; Prak Mony Udom 63', 70'		Ka Zaky 7', 33'

31 Jan 2009

Post Tel Club	10– 0	Battambang
Hok Sochivoan 12', 32', 48', 67'; Ek Vannak 18', 52', 71'; Durosinmi Gafar Adefolarin 25', 39'; Ho Sambo 90+1'

7 Feb 2009

Phuchung Neak	6– 1	Sihanoukville Autonomous Port
Pov Samnang 5', 66'; Heng Sokly 37'; Seur Seyha 54'; A.Silva Sunday 82', 89'		Yim Buntha 58'

7 Feb 2009

National Defense	4– 0	Kampot
Sok Pheng 13', 41'; Lorn Sotheara 45'; Khim Borey 82'

21 Feb 2009

Ranger FC	6– 3	Life University FC
Sokumpheak 14', 23', 28', 50', 90+2'; Samuth Daline 88'		Iem Sarath 36'; Phanny Chamroeun 48', 71'

21 Feb 2009

Nagacorp	2– 0	Koh Kong
Sun Sovannarith 17'; Meas Channa 76'

== Quarter-finals ==
28 Feb 2009

Build Bright United	0– 1	Phnom Penh Crown
		Chan Chhaya 87'

28 Feb 2009

Preah Khan Reach	3– 0	Post Tel Club
Duong Lam Vu 10'; Khoun Laboravy 57'; Hok Sochetra 86'

7 Mar 2009

Phuchung Neak	1– 1 (a.e.t.)	National Defense
A. Silva Sunday 15'		Sin Dalin 64'
Penalties
	4-2

7 Mar 2009

Ranger FC	2– 2 (a.e.t.)	Nagaworld
Ty Bun Vicheth 58'; Sok Phal Udom 111'		Chhim Sambo 81'; Neang Chenla 108'
Penalties
	2-4

== Semi-finals ==
14 March 2009

Phnom Penh Crown	4– 0	Preah Khan Reach
Lappe Jean Roger 32', 49', 57'; Akeep Tunji Ayoyinka 85'

14 March 2009

Phuchung Neak	0– 2	Nagaworld
		Om Thavarak 11'; Choeuk Sokhom 31'

== Third place play-off ==
21 March 2009

Preah Khan Reach	3– 0	Phuchung Neak
Khoun Laboravy 47', 79'; Tum Saray 62'

== Final ==
28 March 2009

Phnom Penh Crown	1– 0	Nagacorp
Keo Sokngon 61'	Report

Olympic Stadium
Attendance: 20,000

Hun Sen Cup 2009

Phnom Penh Crown
2nd Title

== Awards ==
- Top Goal Scorers: Kouch Sokumpheak of Khemara Keila FC (21 goals)
- Goalkeeper of the Season: Hem Simay of Build Bright United
- Fair Play: Phuchung Neak

== See also ==
- 2009 Cambodian League
- Cambodian League
- Hun Sen Cup
