= 2014 Hun Sen Cup =

Tournament details
- Country: Cambodia
- Teams: 29

Final positions
- Champions: Police FC
- Runners-up: Build Bright University FC

Tournament statistics
- Top goal scorer: Khoun Laboravy (12 goals)

Hun Sen Cup, the main football knockout tournament in Cambodia.The 2014 Hun Sen Cup is the 8th season of the Hun Sen Cup, the premier knockout tournament for association football clubs in Cambodia involving Cambodian League and provincial teams organized by the Football Federation of Cambodia.

Nagaworld FC were the defending champions, having beaten National Defense Ministry FC 5–3 on penalty shoot-out after 0-0 extra time in the previous season's final.

== Qualifying round ==
The matches were arranged in six regions and divided into six groups. The top three teams in Group A and the top one team of other five groups from B to F advanced to the Group stage with the eight teams (rank 1 to 8) of Cambodian League 2013.

Group A - Asia Euro United, Western Phnom Penh, Khan Chamkarmon, Khan Meanchey, Khan Dongkor

Group B - Tri Asia, Prey Veng, Svay Rieng Military Police

Group C - Oddar Meanchey, Preah Vihear, Baksei Chamkrong (Siem Reap), Kompong Thom

Group D - Kampong Chhnang, Rice Bank (Pursat), Battambang, Pailin Police

Group E - Sihanouk, Kep, Kampot, Koh Kong Military Police

Group F - Kratie (only one team in this group)

== Group stage ==
The teams finishing in the top two positions in each of the four groups (highlighted in tables) in group stage progressed to the quarter-finals.

=== Group A ===
Pos.	Team	GP	W	D	L	GF	GA	GD	Pts
1	Boeung Ket Angkor	3	3	0	0	22	3	19	9
2	Nagaworld	3	2	0	1	13	3	10	6
3	Sihanouk Province FC	3	1	0	2	5	6	-1	3
4	Kratie Province FC	3	0	0	3	2	30	-28	0

22 January 2014	Boeung Ket Angkor	17–1	Kratie
22 January 2014	Nagaworld	3–0	Sihanouk
5 February 2014	Kratie	0–8	Nagaworld
5 February 2014	Sihanouk	0–2	Boeung Ket Angkor
19 February 2014	Sihanouk	5–1	Kratie
19 February 2014	Boeung Ket Angkor	3–2	Nagaworld

=== Group B ===
Pos.	Team	GP	W	D	L	GF	GA	GD	Pts
1	Kirivong Sok Sen Chey	3	3	0	0	11	4	7	9
2	Preah Khan Reach	3	2	0	1	6	4	2	6
3	Asia Europe University	3	1	0	2	7	7	0	3
4	Khan Chamkarmon	3	0	0	3	4	13	-9	0

29 January 2014	Preah Khan Reach	2–1	Khan Chamkarmon
29 January 2014	Kirivong Sok Sen Chey	3–1	Asia Europe University
5 February 2014	Khan Chamkarmon	2–6	Kirivong Sok Sen Chey
5 February 2014	Asia Europe University	1–3	Preah Khan Reach
19 February 2014	Preah Khan Reach	1–2	Kirivong Sok Sen Chey
19 February 2014	Asia Europe University	5–1	Khan Chamkarmon

=== Group C ===
Pos.	Team	GP	W	D	L	GF	GA	GD	Pts
1	Phnom Penh Crown	3	2	1	0	15	1	+14	7
2	Police FC	3	2	0	1	10	1	+9	6
3	Tri Asia	3	1	1	1	16	3	13	4
4	Kampong Chhnang	3	0	0	0	1	37	-36	0

29 January 2014	Phnom Penh Crown	1–1	Tri Asia
29 January 2014	Police FC	9–0	Kompong Chhnang
12 February 2014	Tri Asia	0–1	Police FC
12 February 2014	Kompong Chhnang	0–13	Phnom Penh Crown
26 February 2014	Kompong Chhnang	1–15	Tri Asia
26 February 2014	Phnom Penh Crown	1–0	Police FC

=== Group D ===
Pos.	Team	GP	W	D	L	GF	GA	GD	Pts
1	National Defense	3	2	1	0	12	2	+10	7
2	Build Bright United	3	2	1	0	11	2	+9	7
3	Western Phnom Penh	3	1	0	2	7	4	3	3
4	Oddar Meanchey	3	0	0	3	0	22	-22	0

22 January 2014	Build Bright United	8–0	Oddar Meanchey
22 January 2014	National Defense	3–0	Western Phnom Penh
12 February 2014	Oddar Meanchey	0–7	National Defense
12 February 2014	Western Phnom Penh	0–1	Build Bright United
26 February 2014	Western Phnom Penh	7–0	Oddar Meanchey
26 February 2014	Build Bright United	2–2	National Defense

== Quarter-finals ==
5 March 2014
14:30

Phnom Penh Crown	0– 1	Build Bright United

Old Stadium
5 March 2014
16:30

Boeung Ket Angkor	5– 1	Preah Khan Reach

Olympic Stadium
5 March 2014
16:45

National Defense	1– 2	Police FC

Old Stadium
5 March 2014
19:00

Kirivong Sok Sen Chey	0– 1	Nagaworld

Olympic Stadium

== Semi-finals ==
9 March 2014
15:30

Boeung Ket Angkor	0– 1	Build Bright United

Olympic Stadium, Phnom Penh
9 March 2014
18:00

Nagaworld	0– 1 (a.e.t.)	Police FC

Olympic Stadium, Phnom Penh

== Third place play-off ==
13 February 2015
17:30

Boeung Ket Angkor	3– 0 The match was originally played on 12/3/2014 but awarded 3-0 by FA decision. The match originally ended 3-3.	Nagaworld
	Report

Olympic Stadium, Phnom Penh

== Final ==
15 March 2014
17:00

Build Bright United	0– 2	Police FC

Olympic Stadium, Phnom Penh

Hun Sen Cup 2014 Champions

Police FC
1st Title

== Awards ==
- Top goal scorer (The golden boot): Khoun Laboravy of Boeung Ket Angkor (12 goals)
- Goalkeeper of the season (The golden glove): Prak Monyphearun of Police FC
- The player of the season: Tith Dina of Police FC
- Fair Play: Boeung Ket Angkor

== See also ==
- 2014 Cambodian League
- Cambodian League
- Hun Sen Cup
