= 2011 Hun Sen Cup =

Tournament details
- Country: Cambodia
- Dates: 7 January – 12 March 2011
- Teams: 32

Final positions
- Champions: Preah Khan Reach
- Runner-up: Build Bright United

Tournament statistics
- Top goal scorer(s): Khuon Laboravy (22 goals)

Hun Sen Cup, the main football knockout tournament in Cambodia. The 2011 Hun Sen Cup was the fifth season of the Hun Sen Cup, the premier knockout tournament for association football clubs in Cambodia involving Cambodian League and provincial teams organized by the Football Federation of Cambodia.

National Defense were the defending champions, having beaten Phnom Penh Crown 3–2 in the previous season's final.

== Group stage ==
The matches were arranged in four regions, two groups in each region. The teams finishing in the top two positions in each of the eight groups in Group stage progressed to the Round of 16 playing in Phnom Penh.

=== Battambang Centre ===
Group A - Prek Pra Keila, Kon Rithysen, Banteay Meanchey, Mekong Kampuchea University

Group B - Build Bright United, Battambang, Oddar Meanchey, Pailin

=== Kampong Thom Centre ===
Group C - Preah Khan Reach, Preah Vihear, Chhlam Samuth, Kratie

Group D - Phnom Penh Crown, Kampong Thom, Baksey Chamkrong, Neak Khiev

=== Prey Veng Centre ===
Group E – Chhma Khmao, Western University, Stung Treng, Kandal

Group F - National Defense, Prey Veng, Police Commissary, Life University

=== Takeo Centre ===
Group G - Nagacorp, Takeo, Kep, Sihanoukville Autonomous Port

Group H - Kirivong Sok Sen Chey, Kampong Speu, Kampot, Koh Kong

== Semi-finals ==
5 Mar 2011

Nagacorp	0 – 4	Preah Khan Reach
	Report	Sam El Nasa 4'; Sok Rithy 42'; Khoun Laboravy 68', 81'

Olympic Stadium
6 Mar 2011

Build Bright United	2 – 1 (a.e.t.)	National Defense
Oum Chandara 8'; Chan Veasna 100'	Report	Phuong Soksana 88'

Olympic Stadium

== Third place play-off ==
11 Mar 2011

Nagacorp	1 – 0	National Defense
Kop Isa 43'

Olympic Stadium

== Final ==
12 Mar 2011

Build Bright United	0 – 2	Preah Khan Reach
		Sam El Nasa 35'; Khoun Laboravy 76'

Olympic Stadium
Referee: Thong Chanketya

Hun Sen Cup 2011 Champions

Preah Khan Reach
1st Title

== Awards ==
- Top Goal Scorer (The Golden Boot): Khoun Laboravy of Preah Khan Reach (22 goals)
- Goalkeeper of the Season (The Golden Glove): Ouk Mic of Preah Khan Reach
- Fair Play: National Defense Ministry FC

== See also ==
- 2011 Cambodian League
- Cambodian League
- Hun Sen Cup
