= 2012 Hun Sen Cup =

Tournament details
- Country: Cambodia

Final positions
- Champions: Preah Khan Reach
- Runners-up: Nagacorp

Tournament statistics
- Top goal scorer: Khoun Laboravy (22 goals)

The 2012 Hun Sen Cup was the 6th season of the Hun Sen Cup, the premier knockout tournament for association football clubs in Cambodia. The reigning champions were Preah Khan Reach, after they won their first title last season. Preah Khan Reach successfully defended their title, beating Nagacorp FC in the final.

== Group stage ==
16 teams entered the group stage, including 9 of the 10 Cambodian League teams. 16 teams were divided into 4 groups of four. The top two teams in each group advanced to the quarter-finals after which the tournament continued in the traditional knockout format.

=== Group A ===
Pos.	Team	GP	W	D	L	GS	GA	GD	Pts
1	Nagacorp	3	2	1	0	21	2	+19	7
2	Chhlam Samuth	3	2	1	0	12	4	+8	7
3	Battambang FC	3	1	0	2	3	15	-12	3
4	Pailin FC	3	0	0	3	0	15	-15	0

1 February 2012	Chhlam Samuth	5–2	Battambang FC
1 February 2012	Pailin FC	0–9	Nagacorp
3 February 2012	Nagacorp	2–2	Chhlam Samuth
3 February 2012	Battambang FC	1–0	Pailin FC
5 February 2012	Battambang FC	0–10	Nagacorp
5 February 2012	Chhlam Samuth	5–0	Pailin FC

Source: Soccerway

=== Group B ===
Pos.	Team	GP	W	D	L	GS	GA	GD	Pts
1	National Defense Ministry	3	2	1	0	10	1	+9	7
2	Kirivong Sok Sen Chey	3	2	1	0	8	3	+5	7
3	Asia Europe University	3	1	0	2	6	9	-3	3
4	Kampot FC	3	0	0	3	2	13	-11	0

1 February 2012	Asia Europe University	0–5	National Defense Ministry
1 February 2012	Kirivong Sok Sen Chey	3–2	Kampot FC
3 February 2012	National Defense Ministry	1–1	Kirivong Sok Sen Chey
3 February 2012	Kampot FC	0–6	Asia Europe University
5 February 2012	Kampot FC	0–4	National Defense Ministry
5 February 2012	Kirivong Sok Sen Chey	4–0	Asia Europe University

Source: Soccerway

=== Group C ===
Pos.	Team	GP	W	D	L	GS	GA	GD	Pts
1	Preah Khan Reach	3	2	1	0	22	3	+19	7
2	Build Bright United	3	2	1	0	18	5	+13	7
3	Koh Kong FC	3	1	0	2	6	16	-10	3
4	Stung Treng FC	3	0	0	3	3	25	-22	0

2 February 2012	Build Bright United	9–2	Stung Treng FC
2 February 2012	Koh Kong FC	1–8	Preah Khan Reach
4 February 2012	Preah Khan Reach	1–1	Build Bright United
4 February 2012	Stung Treng FC	0–3	Koh Kong FC
6 February 2012	Stung Treng FC	1–13	Preah Khan Reach
6 February 2012	Build Bright United	8–2	Koh Kong FC

Source: Soccerway

=== Group D ===
Pos.	Team	GP	W	D	L	GS	GA	GD	Pts
1	National Police Commissary	3	2	1	0	24	1	+23	7
2	Phnom Penh Crown	3	2	1	0	18	1	+17	7
3	Boeung Ket Rubber Field	3	1	0	2	17	3	+14	3
4	Kratie FC	3	0	0	3	1	55	-54	0

2 February 2012	Kratie FC	0–16	Phnom Penh Crown
2 February 2012	Police Commissary	1–0	Boueng Ket Rubber Field
4 February 2012	Phnom Penh Crown	1–1	Police Commissary
4 February 2012	Boueng Ket Rubber Field	17–1	Kratie FC
6 February 2012	Boueng Ket Rubber Field	0–1	Phnom Penh Crown
6 February 2012	Police Commissary	22–0	Kratie FC

Source: Soccerway

== Quarter-finals ==
The top two teams from each group advanced to this stage, where all four group winners were drawn at home.

8 February 2012

Preah Khan Reach	4 – 0	Phnom Penh Crown

Old Stadium, Phnom Penh
8 February 2012

Nagacorp	1 – 0	Kirivong Sok Sen Chey

Phnom Penh National Olympic Stadium, Phnom Penh
8 February 2012

National Police Commissary	2 – 1	Build Bright United

Old Stadium, Phnom Penh
8 February 2012

National Defense Ministry	1 – 1 (a.e.t.)	Chhlam Samuth
Penalties
	5 – 6

Phnom Penh National Olympic Stadium, Phnom Penh

== Semifinals ==
10 February 2012

Nagacorp	4 – 0	Chhlam Samuth

Phnom Penh National Olympic Stadium, Phnom Penh
10 February 2012

Preah Khan Reach	4 – 0	National Police Commissary

Phnom Penh National Olympic Stadium, Phnom Penh

== 3rd place play-off ==
11 February 2012

Chhlam Samuth	0 – 3	National Police Commissary

Phnom Penh National Olympic Stadium, Phnom Penh

== Final ==
12 February 2012

Nagacorp	1 – 2 (a.e.t.)	Preah Khan Reach

Phnom Penh National Olympic Stadium, Phnom Penh

2012 Hun Sen Cup Champion

Preah Khan Reach
2nd Title

== Awards ==
- Top goal scorer (The golden boot): Khoun Laboravy of Preah Khan Reach (22 goals)
- Goalkeeper of the season (The golden glove): Sor Sophea of Preah Khan Reach
- Fair Play: Nagacorp FC

== See also ==
- 2012 Cambodian League
- Cambodian League
- Hun Sen Cup
