= 2013 Hun Sen Cup =

Tournament details
- Country: Cambodia

Final positions
- Champions: Nagacorp FC
- Runners-up: National Defense

Tournament statistics
- Top goal scorer: Chan Vathanaka (11 goals)

Hun Sen Cup, the main football knockout tournament in Cambodia.The 2013 Hun Sen Cup is the 7th season of the Hun Sen Cup, the premier knockout tournament for association football clubs in Cambodia involving Cambodian League and provincial teams organized by the Football Federation of Cambodia.

Preah Khan Reach were the defending champions, having beaten Nagacorp FC 2–1 in the previous season's final.

== Group stage ==
The teams finishing in the top two positions in each of the four groups (highlighted in tables) in group stage progressed to the quarter-finals.

=== Group A ===
Pos.	Team	GP	W	D	L	GF	GA	GD	Pts
1	National Defense	3	2	0	1	16	4	12	6
2	Nagacorp	3	2	0	1	14	4	10	6
3	Chamkarmon FC	3	2	0	1	13	5	8	6
4	Kratie Province FC	3	0	0	3	2	32	-30	0

20 December 2012	Nagacorp	10–0	Kratie
20 December 2012	National Defense	3–0	Chamkarmon
3 January 2013	Kratie	0–11	National Defense
3 January 2013	Chamkarmon	2–0	Nagacorp
17 January 2013	Nagacorp	4–2	National Defense
17 January 2013	Chamkarmon	11–2	Kratie

=== Group B ===
Pos.	Team	GP	W	D	L	GF	GA	GD	Pts
1	Build Bright University FC	3	3	0	0	12	1	11	9
2	Police Commissary	3	2	0	1	12	3	9	6
3	Western University FC	3	1	0	2	5	11	-6	3
4	Kompot Province FC	3	0	0	3	3	17	-14	0

20 December 2012	Police Commissary	6–0	Kompot
20 December 2012	Build Bright University FC	3–0	Western Phnom Penh
3 January 2013	Kompot	1–8	Build Bright University FC
3 January 2013	Western Phnom Penh	2–6	Police Commissary
17 January 2013	Police Commissary	0–1	Build Bright University FC
17 January 2013	Western Phnom Penh	3–2	Kompot

=== Group C ===
Pos.	Team	GP	W	D	L	GF	GA	GD	Pts
1	Boeung Ket Rubber Field	3	3	0	0	20	0	+20	9
2	Kirivong Sok Sen Chey	3	2	0	1	9	5	+4	6
3	Svay Rieng U-19	3	1	0	2	4	6	-2	3
4	Pailin Province FC	3	0	0	0	0	22	-22	0

27 December 2012	Boeung Ket Rubber Field	3–0	Svay Rieng U-19
27 December 2012	Kirivong Sok Sen Chey	6–0	Pailin
10 January 2013	Svay Rieng U-19	0–3	Kirivong Sok Sen Chey
10 January 2013	Pailin	0–12	Boeung Ket Rubber Field
29 January 2013	Boeung Ket Rubber Field	5–0	Kirivong Sok Sen Chey
29 January 2013	Pailin	0–4	Svay Rieng U-19

=== Group D ===
Pos.	Team	GP	W	D	L	GF	GA	GD	Pts
1	Asia Europe University	3	2	1	0	11	3	+8	7
2	Phnom Penh Crown	3	2	1	0	10	4	+6	7
3	Preah Khan Reach	3	1	0	2	8	7	1	3
4	Posenchey FC	3	0	0	3	1	16	-15	0

27 December 2012	Preah Khan Reach	1–3	Asia Europe University
27 December 2012	Phnom Penh Crown	5–0	Posenchey
10 January 2013	Asia Europe University	1–1	Phnom Penh Crown
10 January 2013	Posenchey	0–4	Preah Khan Reach
29 January 2013	Preah Khan Reac	3–4	Phnom Penh Crown
29 January 2013	Posenchey	1–7	Asia Europe University

== Quarter-finals ==
31 January 2013
14:00

National Defense	2– 0	Police Commissary

Olympic Stadium
31 January 2013
14:00

Boeung Ket Rubber Field	0– 1	Phnom Penh Crown

Old Stadium
31 January 2013
16:00

Build Bright University FC	0– 2	Nagacorp

Olympic Stadium
5 February 2013
15:30

Asia Europe University	1– 3 (a.e.t.)	Kirivong Sok Sen Chey

Old Stadium

== Semi-finals ==
8 February 2013
14:00

National Defense	1– 1 (a.e.t.)	Phnom Penh Crown
Penalties
	5–2

Olympic Stadium, Phnom Penh
8 February 2013
17:00

Nagacorp	1– 1 (a.e.t.)	Kirivong Sok Sen Chey
Penalties
	5–4

Olympic Stadium, Phnom Penh

== Third place play-off ==
13 February 2015
14:00

Phnom Penh Crown	3– 0	Kirivong Sok Sen Chey

Olympic Stadium, Phnom Penh

== Final ==
16 February 2013
16:00

National Defense	0– 0 (a.e.t.)	Nagacorp
Penalties
	3–5

Olympic Stadium, Phnom Penh

Hun Sen Cup 2013 Champions

Nagacorp FC
1st Title

== Awards ==
- Top goal scorer (The golden boot): Chan Vathanaka of Boeung Ket Rubber Field (11 goals)
- Goalkeeper of the season (The golden glove): Phorn Ratana of Nagaworld FC
- The player of the season: Choun Chum of Nagaworld FC
- Fair Play: Phnom Penh Crown FC

== See also ==
- 2013 Cambodian League
- Cambodian League
- Hun Sen Cup
