= Dani Kouch =

French footballer (born 1990)

Dani Kouch គួច ដានី
Personal information
- Full name: Dani Kouch
- Date of birth: 11 October 1990 (age 36)
- Place of birth: Nantes, France
- Height: 1.64 m (5 ft 5 in)
- Position: Midfielder

Team information
- Current team: Kirivong Sok Sen Chey
- Number: 10

Senior career*
Years	Team	Apps	(Gls)
2009–2010	Vendée B		
2010–2011	Carquefou B		
2011–2012	FC Montaigu		
2012–2013	La Mellinet Nantes		
2013–2014	Phnom Penh Crown		
2014	Build Bright United		
2014	TriAsia Phnom Penh		
2015–2016	Phnom Penh Crown		
2016	CMAC		
2016–2017	Cambodian Tiger		
2017–2022	Nagaworld		
2023–2026	Svay Rieng	54	(0)
2026–	Kirivong Sok Sen Chey	21	(0)

International career^{‡}
2018–	Cambodia	10	(0)
- * Club domestic league appearances and goals as of 15:02, 9 November 2026 (UTC) ‡ National team caps and goals as of 15:02, 15 February 2019 (UTC)

Dani Kouch (born 11 October 1990) is a professional footballer who plays as a midfielder for Cambodian Premier League club Kirivong Sok Sen Chey. Born in France, he represents Cambodia national team at international level.

== Career ==
Born in Nantes, France, Kouch has played club football for TriAsia Phnom Penh, Phnom Penh Crown and Nagaworld.

He made his international debut for Cambodia in 2018.

== Honours ==
Phnom Penh Crown

- Cambodian League champion: 2015

Nagaworld

- Cambodian League champion: 2018

Preah Khan Reach Svay Rieng

- Cambodian Premier League champion: 2023-24, 2024-25
- Hun Sen Cup champion: 2023-24
- Cambodian Super Cup champion: 2024, 2025
- AFC Challenge League runner-up:2024-25
