= 2011 Cambodian League =

Cambodian League
- Season: 2011
- Champions: Phnom Penh Crown
- Top goalscorer: Oiboh Julius (28 goals)

The 2011 Cambodian League season is the 27th season of top-tier football in Cambodia. A total of ten teams are competing in the league. The season started in March.

== League table ==
Pos	Team	Pld	W	D	L	GF	GA	GD	Pts	Qualification or relegation
1	Phnom Penh Crown	18	14	3	1	54	17	+37	45	2012 AFC President's Cup
2	Nagacorp	18	13	2	3	71	24	+47	41	
3	Preah Khan Reach	18	10	4	4	42	21	+21	34	
4	National Defense Ministry	18	9	2	7	32	22	+10	29	
5	Build Bright United	18	9	1	8	38	25	+13	28	
6	Kirivong Sok Sen Chey	18	8	2	8	38	32	+6	26	
7	Police Commissary	18	7	2	9	26	35	−9	23	
8	Chhlam Samuth	18	5	1	12	31	52	−21	16	
9	Prek Pra Keila	18	4	3	11	16	42	−26	15	Relegation
10	Rithi Sen	18	0	2	16	12	90	−78	2	Relegation

Updated to match(es) played on May 4, 2011. Source: Cambodian League
Rules for classification: 1) points; 2) goal difference; 3) number of goals scored.

== Top scorers ==
Rank	Player	Club	Goals
1	Oiboh Julius	Nagacorp	28
2	Oladiji Nelson Olatunde	Kirivong Sok Sen Chey	14
2	Khoun Laboravy	Preah Khan Reach	14
4	Ayodele Silva	Chhlam Samuth	12
5	Njoku kingsley Metu	Phnom Penh Crown FC	10
6	Phany I Rotha	Preah Khan Reach Svay Rieng	9
6	Teab Vathanak	Nagacorp	9
6	Pich Sina	Build Bright United	9
9	Tum Saray	Preah Khan Reach Svay Rieng	8
9	Om Chandara	Build Bright United	8
