= 2008 Cambodian League =

Cambodian League
- Season: 2008
- Champions: Phnom Penh Empire
- Top goalscorer: Khim Borey (18 goals)

The 2008 Cambodian League season is the 24th season of top-tier football in Cambodia. Statistics of the Cambodian League for the 2008 season.

== Clubs ==
- Khemara Keila
- National Defense
- Phu Chung Neak
- Nagacorp FC
- Phnom Penh Empire (it was called Hello United)
- Post Tel Club
- Preah Khan Reach
- Build Bright United
- Moha Garuda
- Kirivong Sok Sen Chey

== League standings ==
Pos	Team	Pld	W	D	L	GF	GA	GD	Pts
1	Phnom Penh Empire	18	13	1	4	35	15	+20	40
2	National Defense	18	10	4	4	35	21	+14	34
3	Nagacorp FC	18	10	3	5	38	24	+14	33
4	Preah Khan Reach	18	10	3	5	24	18	+6	33
5	Build Bright United	18	10	2	6	31	20	+11	32
6	Khemara Keila	18	7	2	9	29	26	+3	23
7	Kirivong Sok Sen Chey	18	5	4	9	25	36	−11	19
8	Post Tel Club	18	5	2	11	25	36	−11	17
9	Phu Chung Neak	18	3	4	11	26	50	−24	13
10	Moha Garuda	18	3	3	12	13	35	−22	12

Source: RSSSF
