= Sou Yaty =

Cambodian footballer (born 1991)

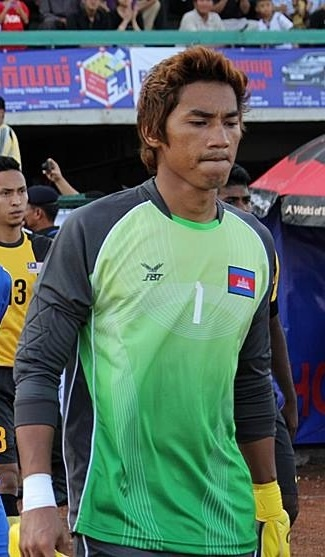
- Yaty playing for Cambodia in 2013

Personal information
- Full name: Sou Yaty
- Date of birth: 17 December 1991 (age 34)
- Place of birth: Phnom Penh, State of Cambodia
- Height: 1.78 m (5 ft 10 in)
- Position: Goalkeeper

Senior career*
Years	Team	Apps	(Gls)
2006–2007	Build Bright United		(0)
2009–2013	National Defense Ministry		(0)
2013–2015	Phnom Penh Crown	17	(0)
2015–2018	Boeung Ket	61	(0)
2018–2024	Nagaworld	30	(0)

International career^{‡}
2012	Cambodia U22	4	(0)
2009–2013	Cambodia U23	14	(0)
2010–2018	Cambodia	37	(0)
- * Club domestic league appearances and goals as of 22 March 2018 ‡ National team caps and goals as of 22 March 2018

Sou Yaty (Khmer: ស៊ូ យ៉ាទី; born 17 December 1991) is a retired Cambodian footballer who lasted play as a goalkeeper for Nagaworld and the Cambodia national team.

== Career ==
The goalkeeper played previously for National Defense Ministry. He signed in summer 2011 for Army Division of Logistics FC.

=== International ===
He made his senior debut in a friendly match against the Philippines on 5 September 2012. The game ended in a scoreless draw.

== Honours ==
=== Club ===
National Defense Ministry

- Hun Sen Cup: 2010

Phnom Penh Crown

- Cambodian League: 2014
- 2014 Mekong Club Championship: Third place

Boeung Ket

- Cambodian League: 2016, 2017
- 2015 Mekong Club Championship: Runner up

Nagaworld FC

- Cambodian League: 2018

=== Individual ===
- Cambodian League Golden gloves: 2014
- Cambodian League Golden gloves: 2017
- 2015 Mekong Club Championship: Goal Keeper of tournament
