= 2007 Hun Sen Cup =

Tournament details
- Country: Cambodia
- Teams: 28

Final positions
- Champions: Khemara Keila FC
- Runner-up: Nagacorp

Tournament statistics
- Top goal scorer(s): Hok Sochivorn

The Hun Sen Cup is the main football knockout tournament in Cambodia. The 2007 Hun Sen Cup was the 1st season of the Hun Sen Cup, the premier knockout tournament for association football clubs in Cambodia involving Cambodian League and provincial teams organized by the Football Federation of Cambodia.

== Group stage ==
There were 28 participants from Cambodian League and other provinces.

== Quarter-finals ==
22 March 2007

Nagacorp	5– 0	Moha Garuda
Sao Vattey 19'; Teap Vathanak 27', 53'; Neang Tith Mesa 68'; Men Pisith 80'

24 March 2007

Red Eagle FC	?– ?	Khemara Keila

24 March 2007

Phnom Penh Empire	3– 1	Royal Cambodian Armed Forces
Hok Sotitya 16'; Hem Samchay 67'; Hok Sochetra 87'		Khim Borey 32'

11 April 2007

Build Bright University	2– 1	Baksey Chamkrong FC
Prom Puth Sithi 18'; Sok Sam Ath 66'		Van Yi 40'

== Semi-finals ==
28 April 2007

Khemara Keila FC	4– 1	Build Bright University
Ung Korn Yanith 30'; Kouch Sokumpheak 50', 71', 76'		Prum Puth Sithy 49'

7 May 2007

Nagacorp	4– 2	Phnom Penh Empire
Vathanak 10', 60', 70', 79'		Hok Sochivorn 78'; Chin Chum 84'

== Third place play-off ==
19 May 2007

Phnom Penh Empire	4– 1	Build Bright University FC
Chin Chum 15'; Hok Sochivorn 20', 48', 68'		Huot Seyha 70'

== Final ==
19 May 2007

Khemara Keila FC	1– 1 (a.e.t.)	Nagacorp
Chan Chhaya 15'		Pich Sina 75'
Penalties
	4-2

== Awards ==
- Top Goal Scorers: Hok Sochivorn of Phnom Penh Crown
- Fair Play: Build Bright University
