= Jean-Roger Lappé-Lappé =

Cameroonian footballer (born 1981)

Personal information
- Date of birth: 30 October 1981 (age 45)
- Place of birth: Cameroon
- Position: Striker

Senior career*
Years	Team	Apps	(Gls)
2008	Phouchung Neak		
2009	Phnom Penh Crown FC		
2009	Samutsongkhram F.C.		
2009	Phnom Penh Crown FC		
2010	TOT S.C.		
2010–2011	Hanthawaddy United F.C.	18	(20)
- * Club domestic league appearances and goals

Jean-Roger Lappé-Lappé (born 30 October 1981 in Cameroon) is a Cameroonian footballer who is last known to have been attached to Hanthawaddy United F.C. of the Myanmar National League.

== Career ==
Plying his trade with Phouchung Neak in 2008, Lappe-Lappe's dexterous and intelligent style of play earned him a move to Phnom Penh Crown, where he stayed until 2009. Throughout his stay there, the Cameroonian scored many goals for the club, including five in the 2009 AFC Cup and a hat-trick in a 4–0 win over Preah Khan Reach in the 2009 Hun Sen Cup semifinal. However, a late winner in the 90th minute opposing Khemara Keila was disallowed due to the referee's decision to mark it an offside.

Expressing gratefulness to coach Chay Sichoeun and Phnom Penh Crown's staff as well as their fans, Lappe-Lappe moved to Okkthar United of the Myanmar National League in 2010, seeking a higher salary. There, the former Samutsongkhram player put in a number of unadulteratedly solid performances for the Taungoo-based team, leading the top scorers charts with 20 goals by the end of his first full season there.

== Honours ==
=== Individual ===
- Myanmar National League Top Scorer: 2010
