= 2019 Hun Sen Cup =

Tournament details
- Country: Cambodia

Final positions
- Champions: Boeung Ket
- Runners-up: Preah Khan Reach

Tournament statistics
- Top goal scorer: Va Sokthorn (11)

Awards
- Best player: Hoy Phallin

The 2019 Hun Sen Cup is the 13th season of the Hun Sen Cup, the premier football knockout tournament in Cambodia, for association football clubs in Cambodia involving Cambodian League and provincial teams organized by the Football Federation of Cambodia. Beoung Ket won the cup after beating Preah Khan Reach 5–4 on Penalty in the final. It was Beoung Ket's first time winning the cup.

The provincial stage started in February 2019.

== Round of 16 ==
Results (two legs):

26 June (1st leg): Siem Reap 0 - 6 Boeung Ket

26 June (1st leg): Electricite du Cambodge 0 - 0 Angkor Tiger

27 June (1st leg): Phnom Penh Crown 10 - 0 Kompong Cham

27 June (1st leg): Preah Khan Reach 4 - 0 Tboung Khmum

3 July (1st leg): Kirivong Sok Sen Chey 2 - 0 NagaWorld

3 July (1st leg): Asia Euro United 1 - 3 National Defense

4 July (1st leg): National Police 0 - 6 Visakha

4 July (1st leg): Soltilo Angkor 10 - 1 Ratanakiri

10 July (2nd leg): Boeung Ket 3 - 0 Siem Reap (9 - 0 agg)

10 July (2nd leg): Angkor Tiger 3 - 2 Electricite du Cambodge (3 - 2 agg)

11 July (2nd leg): Kompong Cham 0 - 14 Phnom Penh Crown (0 - 24 agg)

11 July (2nd leg): Tboung Khmum 1 - 4 Svay Rieng (1 - 8 agg)

17 July (2nd leg): Ratanakiri 5 - 5 Soltilo Angkor (6 - 15 agg)

17 July (2nd leg): National Defense 3 - 2 Asia Euro United (6 - 3 agg)

18 July (2nd leg): NagaWorld 1 - 0 Kirivong Kirivong Sok Sen Chey (1 - 2 agg)

18 July (2nd leg): Visakha 4 - 0 National Police (10 - 0 agg)

== Quarter-finals ==
14 August (1st leg): Boeung Ket 2 - 0 Soltilo Angkor

14 August (1st leg): National Defense 1 - 0 Phnom Penh Crown

14 August (1st leg): Visakha 4 - 2 Kirivong Kirivong Sok Sen Chey

15 August (1st leg): Angkor Tiger 0 - 2 Preah Khan Reach

28 August (2nd leg): Soltilo Angkor 1 - 0 Boeung Ket (1 - 2 agg)

28 August (2nd leg): Kirivong Kirivong Sok Sen Chey 0 - 1 Visakha (2 - 5 agg)

28 August (2nd leg): Phnom Penh Crown 2 - 1 National Defense (2 - 2 agg, 5 - 4 pen)

28 August (2nd leg): Svay Rieng 4 - 0 Angkor Tiger (6 - 0 agg)

== Semi-finals ==
18 September: Visakha 0 - 4 Boeung Ket

19 September: Preah Khan Reach 0 - 0 (5 - 4 pen) Phnom Penh Crown

== Final ==
6 November: Boeung Ket 1 - 1 Preah Khan Reach (aet, 5 - 4 pen)

== Awards ==
- Top goal scorer : Va Sokthorn of Phnom Penh Crown (11 goals)
- Player of the season : Hoy Phallin of Preah Khan Reach
- Goalkeeper of the Season : Hul Kimhuy of Boeung Ket
- Coach of the season : Hao Socheat of Boeung Ket
- Fair Play: Preah Khan Reach

== See also ==
- 2019 Cambodian League
