= Tieng Tiny =

Cambodian footballer

Personal information
- Date of birth: 9 June 1982 (age 44)
- Place of birth: Siem Reap, Cambodia
- Position: Defender

Senior career*
Years	Team	Apps	(Gls)
2006–2007	Khemara Keila		
2007–2008	Nagacorp		
2008–2012	Phnom Penh Crown		
2012–2016	Nagaworld		
2016–2017	Cambodian Tiger		
2017–2019	Visakha		
2020	Preah Khan Reach Svay Rieng		

International career
2006–2010	Cambodia U23		
2006–2020	Cambodia	37	(0)
- * Club domestic league appearances and goals

Tieng Tiny (born 9 June 1982) is a former Cambodian footballer who last played as a defender for Preah Khan Reach Svay Rieng. He captained them to promotion from the Cambodian Second League in 2017. Regarded as one of his country's best defenders for the past few years, Tieng Tiny has been a regular for the Cambodia national team since his international debut in 2006. He joined Crown in 2008 after a season with Naga Corp, having previously signed on with Khemara and Phnom Penh Empire.

== Honours ==
=== Club ===
Phnom Penh Crown

- Cambodian League: 2010,2011
- Hun Sen Cup: 2009
- 2011 AFC President's Cup: Runner up

Nagaworld FC

- Cambodian League: 2007
- Hun Sen Cup: 2013
