= Nhim Sovannara =

Cambodian footballer

Nhim Sovannara ញឹម សុវណ្ណរ៉ា
Personal information
- Full name: Nhim Sovannara
- Date of birth: 10 January 1990 (age 36)
- Place of birth: Kandal, Cambodia
- Height: 1.72 m (5 ft 7 1/2 in)
- Position: Defender

Senior career*
Years	Team	Apps	(Gls)
2009–2014	Build Bright United		
2014–2015	Kirivong Sok Sen Chey		
2015–2020	Nagaworld		

International career
2015	Cambodia	1	(0)
- * Club domestic league appearances and goals

Nhim Sovannara (born 10 January 1990) is a former Cambodian footballer who last played for Nagaworld in the Cambodian League and the Cambodia national football team.
