= Chhin Chhoeun =

Cambodian footballer

Chhin Chhoeun ឈិន ឈឿន
Personal information
- Date of birth: 9 April 1992 (age 34)
- Place of birth: Prey Veng Province, State of Cambodia
- Height: 1.66 m (5 ft 5 in)
- Position: Right winger

Youth career
- National Defense Ministry

Senior career*
Years	Team	Apps	(Gls)
2010–2019	National Defense Ministry		
2020	Preah Khan Reach Svay Rieng		
2021–2022	Tiffy Army	18	(0)

International career^{‡}
2012	Cambodia U22	6	(1)
2011–2015	Cambodia U23	15	(3)
2011–2018	Cambodia	56	(4)
- * Club domestic league appearances and goals ‡ National team caps and goals as of 2 June 2016

Chhin Chhoeun (born 9 April 1992) is a Cambodian former footballer who last played for Tiffy Army in the Cambodian Premier League and the Cambodia national team. Mainly a right winger, he could also play as a striker or a right-back.

== International goals ==
As of 2 June 2016. Final score listed first, with Cambodia's goals listed in bold. "Score" column indicates the score after each goal by Chhoeun.

International goals by date, venue, cap, opponent, score, result and competition
No.	Date	Venue	Cap	Opponent	Score	Result	Competition
1	3 July 2011	New Laos National Stadium, Vientiane, Laos	4	Laos	**1**–2	2–6 (a.e.t.)	2014 FIFA World Cup qualification
2	20 October 2014	New Laos National Stadium, Vientiane, Laos	17	Brunei	**1**–0	1–0	2014 AFF Championship qualification
3	2 June 2016	National Stadium, Kaohsiung, Taiwan	33	Chinese Taipei	**2**–2	2–2	2019 AFC Asian Cup qualification
4	15 October 2016	Olympic Stadium, Phnom Penh, Cambodia	37	Laos	**2**–1	2–1	2016 AFF Championship qualification

== Honours ==
National Defense Ministry

- Hun Sen Cup: 2010, 2016
