= Sok Chanraksmey =

Cambodian footballer

Personal information
- Full name: Sok Chanraksmey
- Date of birth: 10 January 1992 (age 34)
- Place of birth: Phnom Penh, State of Cambodia
- Height: 1.72 m (5 ft 7 1/2 in)
- Position: Forward

Youth career
- –2010: Svay Rieng

Senior career*
Years	Team	Apps	(Gls)
2010–2012	Svay Rieng		
2013–2016	Cambodia Tiger		
2016	National Defense Ministry		
2016–2018	Electricite du Cambodge		
2019–2021	Asia Euro United		

International career^{‡}
2013–2018	Cambodia	11	(5)
- * Club domestic league appearances and goals as of 29 March 2015 ‡ National team caps and goals as of 29 March 2015

Sok Chanraksmey (Khmer: សុខ ចាន់រស្មី, born 10 January 1992) is a former Cambodian footballer who last played for Asia Euro United in the Cambodian League.

== International career ==
He made his senior international debut on 24 March 2013 in a 2014 AFC Challenge Cup qualification match against Philippines. He scored his first international goal in a friendly match against Malaysia. He scored all three goals for his country in 2014 AFF Suzuki Cup qualification match against Timor-Leste which his country came behind to win that match 3–2.

== International goals ==
#	Date	Venue	Opponent	Score	Result	Competition
1.	20 September 2014	Shah Alam Stadium, Shah Alam	Malaysia	1–3	1–4	Exhibition game
2.	12 October 2014	New Laos National Stadium, Vientiane	Laos	2–2	2–3	2014 AFF Suzuki Cup qualification
3.	16 October 2014	New Laos National Stadium, Vientiane	Timor-Leste	1–2	3–2	2014 AFF Suzuki Cup qualification
4.	16 October 2014	New Laos National Stadium, Vientiane	Timor-Leste	2–2	3–2	2014 AFF Suzuki Cup qualification
5.	16 October 2014	New Laos National Stadium, Vientiane	Timor-Leste	3–2	3–2	2014 AFF Suzuki Cup qualification

== Honours ==
=== Club ===
Svay Rieng

- Cambodian League: 2013
- Hun Sen Cup: 2011, 2012

National Defense Ministry

- Hun Sen Cup: 2016

=== Individual ===
- Hun Sen Cup Top scorer: 2008
