= Hun Sen Cup =

Annual Cambodian football tournament

- Organiser(s): Football Federation of Cambodia
- Founded: 2007; 19 years ago
- Region: Cambodia
- Domestic cup: Cambodian Super Cup
- Current champions: Phnom Penh Crown (3rd title)
- Most championships: Preah Khan Reach Svay Rieng (5 titles)
- Broadcaster: BTV Cambodia
- Website: cncc-football.com/hun-sen-cup
- 2025–26

The Hun Sen Cup (Khmer: ពានរង្វាន់សម្តេចហ៊ុន សែន) is a Cambodian knockout football cup competition held annually by the Football Federation of Cambodia (FFC). Thirty-four teams participated in the competition as of 2023–24 season, including all clubs from the Cambodian Premier League and some from the Cambodian League 2. The cup usually starts from February and ends in November, the winner qualifies for the Cambodian Super Cup.

Preah Khan Reach Svay Rieng have won a record five titles. The current holders are Phnom Penh Crown, who beat the record holder Svay Rieng 2–1 in the 2025 final to win their third title.

== Format ==
The Samdech Akka Moha Sena Padei Techo Hun Sen Cup refers to the name of Prime Minister Hun Sen. This trophy was first organized in 2007. 28 teams then participated. There were 2 stages - group and knockout. 16 teams which qualified from the group stage played in the knockout stage until the finals.

In the 6th season of the Hun Sen Cup (2012), the format was changed until now. The top 8 or 10 teams of Cambodian League enter the group stage while the other teams from Phnom Penh and provinces play in qualification before going through to the group stage.

== Finals ==
List of finals:

Year	Final			Third place match		
Year	Champions	Score	Runners-up	Third place	Score	Fourth place
2007	Khemara Keila (Note: Khemara Keila FC was disbanded in 2011 due to financial crisis)	1–1 (a.e.t.) (4–2 p)	Nagacorp (Note: Nagaworld FC.)	Phnom Penh Empire (Note: Phnom Penh Crown FC)	4–1	Build Bright University
2008	Phnom Penh Empire	1–0	Preah Khan Reach	Build Bright University	3–2	Khemara Keila
2009	Phnom Penh Crown	1–0	Nagacorp	Preah Khan Reach	3–0	Phuchung Neak (Note: Chhlam Samuth FC.)
2010	National Defense	3–2	Phnom Penh Crown	Preah Khan Reach	3–2	Nagacorp
2011	Preah Khan Reach	2–0	Build Bright United	Nagacorp	1–0	National Defense
2012	Preah Khan Reach	2–1 (a.e.t.)	Nagacorp	Police Commissary	3–0	Chhlam Samuth
2013	Nagacorp	0–0 (a.e.t.) (5–3 p)	National Defense	Phnom Penh Crown	3–0	Kirivong Sok Sen Chey
2014	Police Commissary	2–0	Build Bright United	Boeung Ket Rubber Field	3–0	Nagacorp
2015	Svay Rieng (Note: Preah Khan Reach Svay Rieng FC)	2–1	Nagaworld	Cambodian Tiger (Note: Angkor Tiger FC.)	3–0	Police Commissary
2016	National Defense	1–1 (a.e.t.) (6–5 p)	Preah Khan Reach	Phnom Penh Crown	1–0	CMAC United
2017	Preah Khan Reach	3–0	Nagaworld	Electricite du Cambodge	1–1 (a.e.t.) (5–4 p)	Boeung Ket
2018	National Defense	3–0	Police Commissary	Angkor Tiger, Nagaworld (Note: No third place match has been played in 2018 and 2019)		
2019	Boeung Ket	1–1 (a.e.t.) (5–4 p)	Preah Khan Reach	Phnom Penh Crown, Visakha		
2020	Visakha	2–0	Nagaworld	Prey Veng	4–2	Phnom Penh Crown
2021	Visakha	2–2 (a.e.t.) (5–4 p)	Preah Khan Reach	Boeung Ket	2–0	Phnom Penh Crown
2022	Visakha	4–3 (a.e.t.)	Boeung Ket	Phnom Penh Crown	5–0	Electricite du Cambodge
2023–24	Preah Khan Reach Svay Rieng	1–0	Phnom Penh Crown	Visakha	0–0 (a.e.t.) (4–3 p)	Boeung Ket
2024–25	Phnom Penh Crown	2–1	Preah Khan Reach Svay Rieng	Boeung Ket	3–0	Visakha
2025–26	Preah Khan Reach Svay Rieng	4–4 (a.e.t.) (5–3 p)	Visakha	Boeung Ket, ISI Dangkor Senchey		

== Performance by club ==
Club	Champions	Runners-up	Top 2
Preah Khan Reach	6 (2011, 2012, 2015, 2017, 2023–24, 2025–26)	5 (2008, 2016, 2019, 2021, 2024–25)	11
Phnom Penh Crown	3 (2008, 2009, 2024–25)	2 (2010, 2023–24)	5
Tiffy Army	3 (2010, 2016, 2018)	1 (2013)	4
Visakha	3 (2020, 2021, 2022)	1 (2025–26)	4
Nagaworld	1 (2013)	6 (2007, 2009, 2012, 2015, 2017, 2020)	7
Ministry of Interior	1 (2014)	1 (2018)	2
Boeung Ket	1 (2019)	1 (2022)	2
Khemara Keila	1 (2007)	—	1
Build Bright United	—	2 (2011, 2014)	2
Total	19	19	38

== Top scorers ==
Season	Player	Club	Goals
2007	(Cambodia) Hok Sochivorn	Phnom Penh Crown	Unknown
2008	(Cambodia) Sok Chanraksmey	Spark FC	12
2009	(Cambodia) Kouch Sokumpheak	Khemara Keila	21
2010	(Cambodia) Kouch Sokumpheak	Khemara Keila	20
2010	(Cambodia) Srey Veasna	Phnom Penh Crown	20
2011	(Cambodia) Khoun Laboravy	Preah Khan Reach	22
2012	(Cambodia) Khoun Laboravy	Preah Khan Reach	22
2013	(Cambodia) Chan Vathanaka	Boeung Ket Angkor	11
2014	(Cambodia) Khoun Laboravy	Boeung Ket Angkor	12
2015	(Cambodia) Prak Mony Udom	Preah Khan Reach	24
2016	(Cambodia) Suong Virak	Cambodian Tiger	25
2017	(Cambodia) Khoun Laboravy	Boeung Ket	16
2018	(Cambodia) Noun Borey	Police Commissary	9
2019	(Cambodia) Va Sokthorn	Phnom Penh Crown	11
2020	(Cambodia) Wut Tola	Prey Veng	6
2021	(Cambodia) Keo Sokpheng	Visakha	7
2022	(Cambodia) Sieng Chanthea	Boeung Ket	6
2023–24	(Brazil) Jonata	Visakha	6
2024–25	(Cambodia) Sieng Chanthea	Boeung Ket	6
2024–25	(Cambodia) Prak Mony Udom	Preah Khan Reach Svay Rieng	6
2025–26	(Ghana) Nana Kwame Oppong	Visakha	7

== Awards ==
=== Prize money ===
==== Regional stage ====
- Champion: 20,000,000 riels
- Runner-up: 10,000,000 riels
- Third place: 8,000,000 riels

==== National stage ====
- Champion: 150,000,000 riels
- Runner-up: 100,000,000 riels
- Third place: 70,000,000 riels
