= Chin Chum =

Cambodian footballer

Personal information
- Full name: Chin Chum
- Date of birth: 7 October 1985 (age 41)
- Place of birth: People's Republic of Kampuchea (in present-day Cambodia)
- Height: 1.76 m (5 ft 9 1/2 in)
- Position: Striker

Senior career*
Years	Team	Apps	(Gls)
2004–2006	Koh Kong		
2006–2008	Phnom Penh Empire		
2008–2016	Nagaworld		
2016–2017	Asia Euro United		
2017–2018	Electricite du Cambodge		

International career
2007–2008	Cambodia	3	(1)

Managerial career
- 2023–: Nagaworld (Assistant)
- * Club domestic league appearances and goals

Chin Chum (born 7 October 1985) is a Cambodian football coach and former player who is the assistant coach of Cambodian Premier League club Nagaworld.

He has represented Cambodia at senior international level.

== Honours ==
=== Club ===
Nagacorp FC

- Cambodian League: 2009
- Hun Sen Cup: 2013

=== Individual ===
- Hun Sen Cup Best player: 2013

== International goals ==
#	Date	Venue	Opponent	Score	Result	Competition
1.	August 19, 2007	New Delhi, India	Kyrgyzstan	3–4	Lose	2007 Nehru Cup
