= Prak Sovannara =

Cambodia football manager and former player

Personal information
- Full name: Prak Sovannara
- Date of birth: 7 November 1972 (age 53)
- Place of birth: Cambodia

Senior career*
Years	Team	Apps	(Gls)
1991–1993	Civil Aviation		
1994–1997	Body Guards Club		
1997–1999	Phnom Penh Ranger		

International career
1993–1999	Cambodia	14	(0)

Managerial career
- 2008–2009: Cambodia
- 2009: Preah Khan Reach
- 2012–2013: Cambodia
- 2013–2014: Nagacorp
- 2014: Kirivong Sok Sen Chey
- 2015–2017: Boeung Ket Angkor
- 2017–2018: Cambodia (caretaker)
- 2019–2020: National Police Commissary
- 2024: Life
- * Club domestic league appearances and goals

Prak Sovannara is a Cambodian football manager he is currently performance director of Cambodia. He previously had multiple stints as the coach of the Cambodian national football team. He also had stints with numerous clubs including one with Boeung Ket Angkor from 2015 to 2017.

== Honours ==
=== Individual ===
- 2015 Cambodian League 'Coach of the Season'
