= Ouk Mic =

Cambodian footballer

Personal information
- Full name: Ouk Mic
- Date of birth: January 1, 1980 (age 46)
- Place of birth: Cambodia
- Height: 1.76 m (5 ft 9 1/2 in)
- Position: Goalkeeper

Senior career*
Years	Team	Apps	(Gls)
2004–2006	Khemara		
2009–2011	Preah Khan Reach		

International career
- Cambodia U23
2002–2011	Cambodia	19	(0)

Managerial career
- 2012: Cambodia U-14 (Goalkeeper Coach)
- 2013: Cambodia Girls U-14 (Goalkeeper Coach)
- 2015–2017: Nagaworld FC (Goalkeeper Coach)
- 2017–: National Police Commissary (Goalkeeper Coach)
- * Club domestic league appearances and goals

Ouk Mic (born 1 January 1980 in Cambodia) is a retired Cambodian footballer who plays for home country club Preah Khan Reach in Metfone C-League as a goalkeeper. He was called up to Cambodia national football team at 2010 AFF Suzuki Cup qualification and 2014 FIFA World Cup qualification against Laos.
