= 1985 Cambodian League =

Cambodian League
- Season: 1985

The 1985 Cambodian League season is the 4th season of top-tier football in Cambodia. Statistics of the Cambodian League for the 1985 season.

== Overview ==
National Defense Ministry won the championship.
