= Sok Pheng (footballer) =

Cambodian footballer

Personal information
- Full name: Sok Pheng
- Date of birth: October 20, 1990 (age 36)
- Place of birth: Cambodia
- Height: 1.71 m (5 ft 7 1/2 in)
- Position: Striker

Senior career*
Years	Team	Apps	(Gls)
2009–2012	Phnom Penh Crown		
2012–2013	Kirivong Sok Sen Chey		
2013–2016	Boeung Ket Angkor		
2016	Nagaworld		
2016–2017	Boeung Ket Angkor		

International career
2011–2017	Cambodia	4	(0)
- * Club domestic league appearances and goals

Sok Pheng (born October 20, 1990, in Cambodia) is a footballer for Boeung Ket Angkor in the Cambodian League. He also plays for the Cambodia national team. He plays as a striker.

== Club ==
Phnom Penh Crown

- Cambodian League: 2011
- 2011 AFC President's Cup: Runner up

Boeung Ket FC

- Cambodian League: 2017
