= Harley Willard =

Scottish footballer (born 1997)

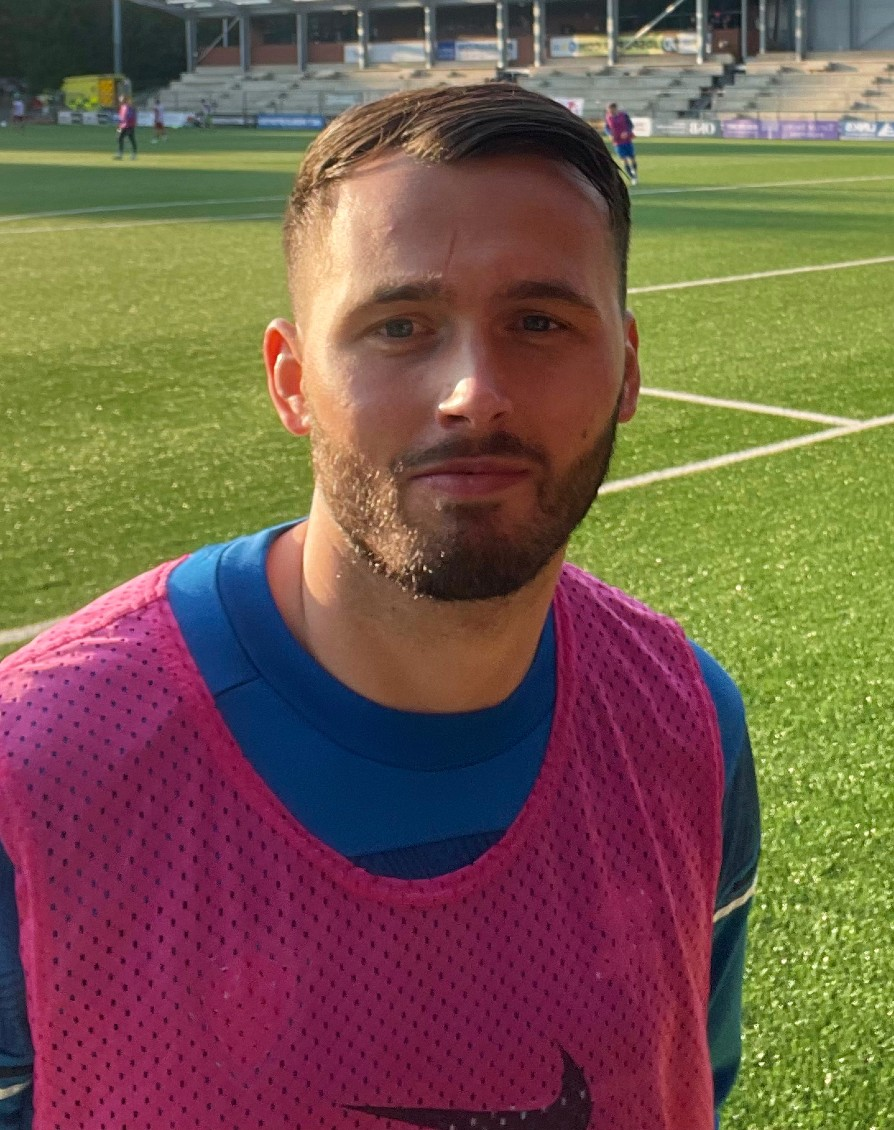

Personal information
- Full name: Harley Bryn Willard
- Date of birth: 4 September 1997 (age 29)
- Place of birth: London, England
- Height: 1.80 m (5 ft 11 in)
- Position: Attacking midfielder

Team information
- Current team: Ægir
- Number: 22

Youth career
- 2006–2013: Arsenal
- 2013–2017: Southampton

Senior career*
Years	Team	Apps	(Gls)
2017	Maidstone United	3	(0)
2017	→ Eastbourne Borough (loan)	9	(0)
2018	Welling United	2	(1)
2018	Hässleholms IF	16	(9)
2018	Svay Rieng		
2019–2021	Víkingur Ólafsvík	68	(36)
2022	Þór	22	(11)
2023–2024	KA	47	(5)
2025	Selfoss	19	(1)
2026–	Ægir	22	(6)

International career
2013	Scotland U16	1	(1)
- Scotland U18
- * Club domestic league appearances and goals as of 13 September 2026

Harley Bryn Willard (born 4 September 1997) is a professional footballer who plays as an attacking midfielder for Icelandic club Ægir. Born in England, he has represented Scotland at youth international level. Willard is best known to Iceland football, having won the Icelandic Cup in 2024 with KA. He previously also played for Icelandic clubs Vikingur Olafsvik, and Þór Akureyri.

== Early life ==
Willard joined the academy at Arsenal at the age of 9 before joining Southampton at the age of 15. He debuted for the club's under-23 team at the age of sixteen. He was regarded as one of the club's most promising prospects.

== Club career ==
In 2018, Willard signed for Cambodian side Svay Rieng. He was described as "made a big impact... impressed on the pitch... contributing several assists". In 2022, he signed for Icelandic side Þór. He was regarded as one of the club's most important players. In February 2025, Willard joined 1. deild karla side Selfoss. In February 2026, Willard signed for newly-promoted 1. deild karla side Ægir.

== International career ==
Willard has played for Scotland at youth international level. In April 2013, he scored on his debut for Scotland U16.

== Style of play ==
Willard mainly operates as midfielder, winger, or striker. He is known for his speed.

== Honours ==
KA Akureyri

- Icelandic Men's Football Cup: 2024
