= Faris Hammouti =

Moroccan footballer

Personal information
- Date of birth: 21 January 1997 (age 29)
- Place of birth: Utrecht, Netherlands
- Height: 1.86 m (6 ft 1 in)
- Position: Centre-back

Team information
- Current team: Preah Khan Reach Svay Rieng
- Number: 4

Youth career
- 2005–2006: IJFC
- 2006–2016: Feyenoord

Senior career*
Years	Team	Apps	(Gls)
2016–2018	Feyenoord	0	(0)
2017–2018	→ Almere City (loan)	19	(1)
2017–2018	→ Jong Almere City (loan)	37	(6)
2018–2022	Almere City	95	(8)
2022–2024	Den Bosch	32	(5)
2024–2025	Emmen	28	(0)
2025–	Preah Khan Reach	22	(2)

International career
2017	Morocco U20	3	(0)
- * Club domestic league appearances and goals as of 9 November 2026

Faris Hammouti (born 21 January 1997) is a Moroccan professional footballer who plays as a centre-back for Cambodian Premier League club Preah Khan Reach Svay Rieng.

== Professional career ==
Hammouti began his football training with IJFC for the 2005–06 season, and after a year transferred to the Feyenoord academy. He began as a winger, moved to midfield, and then settled into playing as a defender. After 10 years in the academy, Hammouti signed his first professional contract with Feyenoord on 16 June 2016.

On 31 January 2017, Hammouti joined Almere City FC for the rest of the 2016–17 season. Hammouti extended his loan at Almere City for another year on 31 May 2017, opting to stay with the team during the 2017–18 season.

On 30 August 2022, Hammouti signed a two-year contract with Den Bosch. On 18 January 2024, Hammouti's contract with Den Bosch was terminated by mutual consent.

On 22 January 2024, Hammouti signed a contract with Emmen until June 2026.

== International career ==
Born in the Netherlands to Moroccan parents, Hammouti is a youth international for Morocco.
