= Chantha Chanteaka =

Cambodian footballer

Personal information
- Full name: Chantha Chanteaka
- Date of birth: 29 September 2000 (age 26)
- Place of birth: Phnom Penh, Cambodia
- Height: 1.73 m (5 ft 8 in)
- Position: Left winger

Team information
- Current team: Preah Khan Reach Svay Rieng
- Number: 22

Senior career*
Years	Team	Apps	(Gls)
2019–2022	Electricite du Cambodge		
2023–2025	Boeung Ket	42	(4)
2025–	Preah Khan Reach Svay Rieng	8	(0)

International career^{‡}
2018	Cambodia futsal		
2023	Cambodia	5	(0)
- * Club domestic league appearances and goals as of 4 May 2026 ‡ National team caps and goals as of 12:04, 18 October 2023 (UTC)

Chantha Chanteaka (born 29 September 2000) is a Cambodian professional footballer who plays as a left winger for Cambodian Premier League club Preah Khan Reach Svay Rieng and the Cambodia national team.

== Career statistics ==
=== International ===
As of matches played 9 September 2023.

National team	Year	Apps	Goals
Cambodia	2023	1	0
Total		1	0
