= 2014 AFF Championship qualification =

Tournament details
- Host country: Laos
- Dates: 12–20 October
- Teams: 5 (from 1 sub-confederation)
- Venue: 2 (in 1 host city)

Tournament statistics
- Matches played: 10
- Goals scored: 33 (3.3 per match)
- Top scorer(s): (Cambodia) Sok Chanraksmey (Laos) Soukaphone Vongchiengkham (4 goals each)

The 2014 AFF Championship qualification tournament was the qualification process for the 2014 AFF Championship, the tenth edition of the ASEAN Football Championship. It was held in Laos from 12 to 20 October 2014, and involved the five lower ranked teams in Southeast Asia. The format was a single round-robin tournament with the top two teams qualifying for the tournament proper.

== Venues ==
(Laos) Vientiane
New Laos National Stadium	Chao Anouvong Stadium
Capacity: 25,000	Capacity: 15,000
2014 AFF Championship qualification is located in Laos

== Fixtures ==
- Times listed are local (UTC+7)

Pos	Team	Pld	W	D	L	GF	GA	GD	Pts	Qualification
1	Myanmar	4	3	1	0	6	2	+4	10	AFF Championship
2	Laos (H)	4	3	0	1	10	6	+4	9	AFF Championship
3	Cambodia	4	2	0	2	6	6	0	6	
4	Timor-Leste	4	1	1	2	6	7	−1	4	
5	Brunei	4	0	0	4	5	12	−7	0	

Source: AFF
(H) Hosts
12 October 2014
15:30

Timor-Leste	4 – 2	Brunei
Murilo 6', 70', 80'; Patrick Fabiano 88'	Report	Adi 35'; Fakharrazi 41'

New Laos National Stadium, Vientiane
Referee: Rowan Arumughan (India)
12 October 2014
18:30

Laos	3 – 2	Cambodia
Sihavong 54'; Sayavutthi 70', 81'	Report	Laboravy 73'; Chanrasmey 75'

New Laos National Stadium, Vientiane
Referee: Adham Makhadmeh (Jordan)

14 October 2014
15:30

Brunei	2 – 4	Laos
Fakharrazi 32'; Shah Razen 88'	Report	Vongchiengkham 3', 6', 68'; Sayavutthi 49'

New Laos National Stadium, Vientiane
Referee: Dmitriy Mashentsev (Kyrgyzstan)
14 October 2014
18:30

Myanmar	0 – 0	Timor-Leste
	Report

New Laos National Stadium, Vientiane
Referee: Jumpei Iida (Japan)

16 October 2014
15:30

Timor-Leste	2 – 3	Cambodia
Anggisu 25'; Bertoldo 51'	Report	Chanrasmey 64', 78', 82'

New Laos National Stadium, Vientiane
Referee: Fu Ming (China)
16 October 2014
18:30

Brunei	1 – 3	Myanmar
Adi 78'	Report	Min Min Thu 48'; Kyaw Ko Ko 53'; Kyi Lin 82'

New Laos National Stadium, Vientiane
Referee: Adham Makhadmeh (Jordan)

18 October 2014
15:30

Cambodia	0 – 1	Myanmar
	Report	Kyaw Ko Ko 42' (pen.)

New Laos National Stadium, Vientiane
Referee: Jumpei Iida (Japan)
18 October 2014
18:30

Laos	2 – 0	Timor-Leste
Khochalern 32'; Vongchiengkham 64'	Report

New Laos National Stadium, Vientiane
Referee: Fu Ming (China)

20 October 2014
17:00

Myanmar	2 – 1	Laos
Nanda Lin Kyaw Chit 43'; Kyaw Ko Ko 80' (pen.)	Report	Souksavanh 90+4' (pen.)

New Laos National Stadium, Vientiane
Referee: Dmitriy Mashentsev (Kyrgyzstan)
20 October 2014
17:00

Cambodia	1 – 0	Brunei
Chhoeun 56'	Report

Chao Anouvong Stadium, Vientiane
Referee: Rowan Arumughan (India)

== Goal scorers ==
4 goals

- (Cambodia) Sok Chanraksmey
- (Laos) Soukaphone Vongchiengkham

3 goals

- (Laos) Khampheng Sayavutthi
- (Myanmar) Kyaw Ko Ko
- (Timor-Leste) Murilo de Almeida

2 goals

- (Brunei) Adi Said
- (Brunei) Fakharrazi Hassan

1 goal

- (Brunei) Shah Razen Said
- (Cambodia) Chhin Chhoeun
- (Cambodia) Khoun Laboravy
- (Laos) Phoutthasay Khochalern
- (Laos) Khonesavanh Sihavong
- (Laos) Ketsada Souksavanh
- (Myanmar) Kyi Lin
- (Myanmar) Min Min Thu
- (Myanmar) Nanda Lin Kyaw Chit
- (Timor-Leste) Anggisu Barbosa
- (Timor-Leste) Filipe Bertoldo
- (Timor-Leste) Patrick Fabiano
