= Chhong Bunnath =

Cambodian footballer

Chhong Bunnath ឈង់ ប៊ុនណាត
Personal information
- Full name: Chhong Bunnath
- Date of birth: November 28, 1998 (age 27)
- Place of birth: Siem Reap, Cambodia
- Height: 1.80 m (5 ft 11 in)
- Position: Centre back

Team information
- Current team: Nagaworld
- Number: 4

Youth career
- 2015–2018: Kiri Dongrek
2019–2021	Angkor Tiger		
2022–2024	Visakha	3	(0)
2023–2024	→ Nagaworld (loan)	17	(0)
2024–	Nagaworld	24	(3)

International career^{‡}
Years	Team	Apps	(Gls)
2019	Cambodia U23	4	(0)
2019–2023	Cambodia	3	(0)
- ‡ National team caps and goals as of 22 February 2026 (UTC)

Chhong Bunnath (born 28 November 1998) is a Cambodian professional footballer who plays as a centre back for Cambodian Premier League club Nagaworld.

== Club career ==
Bunnath made his senior debut in Cambodia League in 2018 For Soltilo Angkor.

== International career ==
Bunnath made his senior debut in 2020 AFC U-23 Championship qualification against Australia national under-23 soccer team on 22 March 2019.
