= Va Sokthorn =

French-born Cambodian footballer (born 1987)

Personal information
- Full name: Va Sokthorn
- Date of birth: July 14, 1987 (age 39)
- Place of birth: Le Creusot, France
- Height: 1.70 m (5 ft 7 in)

Senior career*
Years	Team	Apps	(Gls)
- ES Torcy
- FC Montceau Bourgogne
- US Motte Servolex
- SO Chambéry Foot
2013–2014	JO Le Creusot	14	(17)
2014–2015	Phnom Penh Crown	22	(8)
2015–2016	JO Le Creusot	16	(5)
2016–2017	UFC Torcy	20	(3)
2017–2018	US Saint-Sernin-du-Bois	10	(2)
2019	Saint apolinnaire		
2019	Phnom Penh Crown FC		
2020	Nagaworld FC		

International career
2015	Cambodia	6	(1)
- * Club domestic league appearances and goals

Va Sokthorn is a footballer who is currently playing for Nagaworld FC in the Cambodian League. Born in France, he has represented Cambodia at senior international level.

== Personal life ==
Va Sokthorn was born in Le Creusot in the province of Burgundy to Cambodian parents from Kratié Province and Prey Veng Province. After scoring 17 goals in only 14 appearances for his local side in the 2013-14 season he decided to go to his parents homeland to play in hope of making the national team, despite interest from other French teams. In August 2015 Va Sokthorn became the third French-Cambodian player to sign for Phnom Penh Crown.

== International career ==
Va Sokthorn played 4 times for his parents' homeland in qualification for the 2018 World Cup.

== Career statistics ==
=== International ===
Appearances and goals by national team and year
National team	Year	Apps	Goals
Cambodia	2015	6	1
Total		6	1

Scores and results list Cambodia's goal tally first, score column indicates score after each Sokthorn goal.

List of international goals scored by Va Sokthorn
No.	Date	Venue	Opponent	Score	Result	Competition
1	3 November 2015	Olympic Stadium, Phnom Penh, Cambodia	Brunei	2–1	6–1	Friendly

== Honours ==
=== Club ===
Phnom Penh Crown

- Cambodian League: 2015
