= Commissaire de police =

Police commissioner in France

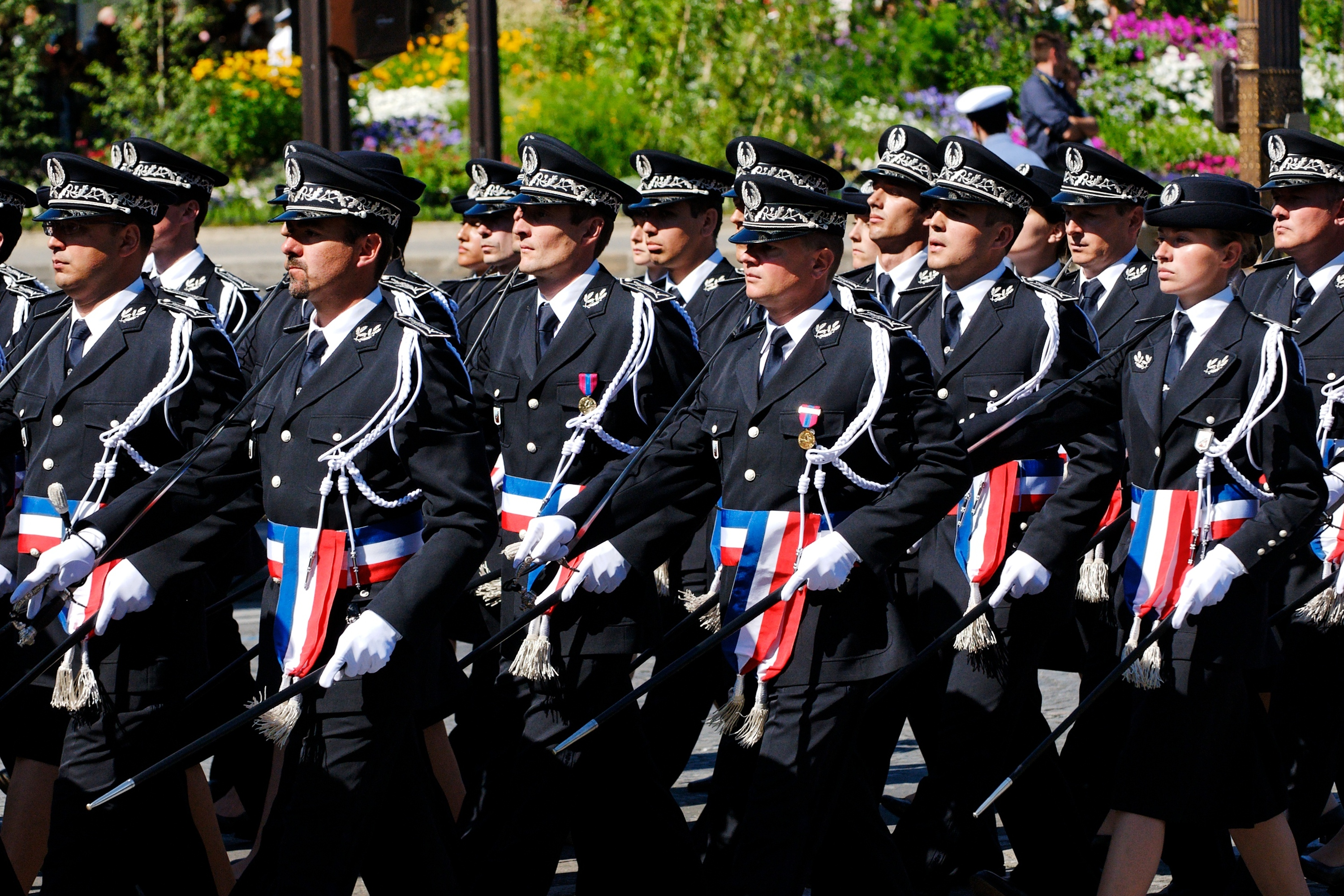
Students of the École nationale supérieure de la police at the parade of 14 July 2008

Commissaire de police is a rank or group of ranks in the French National Police. It should not be confused with the French appointment of "armed forces commissary" (commissaire des armées) which is an administrative military position.

== Overview ==
Every commune with a population of more than 30,000-50,000 has a commissaire in charge of its detachment of the National Police, and larger communes have more than one (the Prefecture of Police of Paris has well over one hundred). A commissaire has both an administrative role and an investigative role. In most circumstances, a commissaire is responsible for leading a police station.

Most officers join directly at the rank of commissaire. All are university graduates, usually in law, and have completed a further training course. It is also possible for junior officers to be promoted to the rank (something which was virtually impossible until relatively recently). A commissaire may be promoted to commissaire divisionnaire (a rank which existed in the Paris Police and the Mobile Brigades from the early 20th century), and thence to the higher ranks of the service.

The police station which serves as an ordinary commissaire's headquarters and the area for which they are responsible is a commissariat, a term which can also refer to the body of commissaires as a whole.

== Subdivisions of the status ==
There are 8 ranks of officer who are commissaires. The first four are ranks to which one is promoted, whilst the latter four are appointments made by the government, including the Director General of Police although he is usually selected from the Corps de Préfets. In Paris, a slightly different higher rank structure applies, based on the civilian administrative system and not the armed-forces derived Police system.

The 4 ranks of commissaire, including the Commissaire Principal, scrapped in 2006.

The 4 tiers of directors. They are not ranks but rather Commissaires Généraux who are named at the discretion of the government to these roles.

== Rank equivalence ==
There is no direct equivalent grade in a British-style police system. The term commissioner is an inaccurate literal translation. A newly-graduated commissaire may often be found in charge of a police station, so to this end, the grade is equivalent to a British superintendent, although the latter may also be more comparable to a Commandant de Police à l'Emploi Fonctionnel . The problem becomes more complicated when discussing commissaires divisionnaires and généraux, as the grade equivalence is less clear. A commissaire général may be a regional head of the Police Judiciaire (CID), for instance. In London, this would be a role fulfilled by an assistant commissioner. However, this officer is likely to be more akin in rank to a deputy assistant commissioner. The rank of a commissaire divisionnaire is best described as equivalent to a deputy assistant commissioner or commander. A commissaire principal, when it was in existence, would be equivalent to a chief superintendent. The highest four ranks do not have any form of equivalence, as the Director-General and his deputies are in charge of the whole of France's policing.

Commissaires, as commissioners, are commissioned by the government to undertake civil and administrative duties as well as some quasi-judicial roles.

== History ==
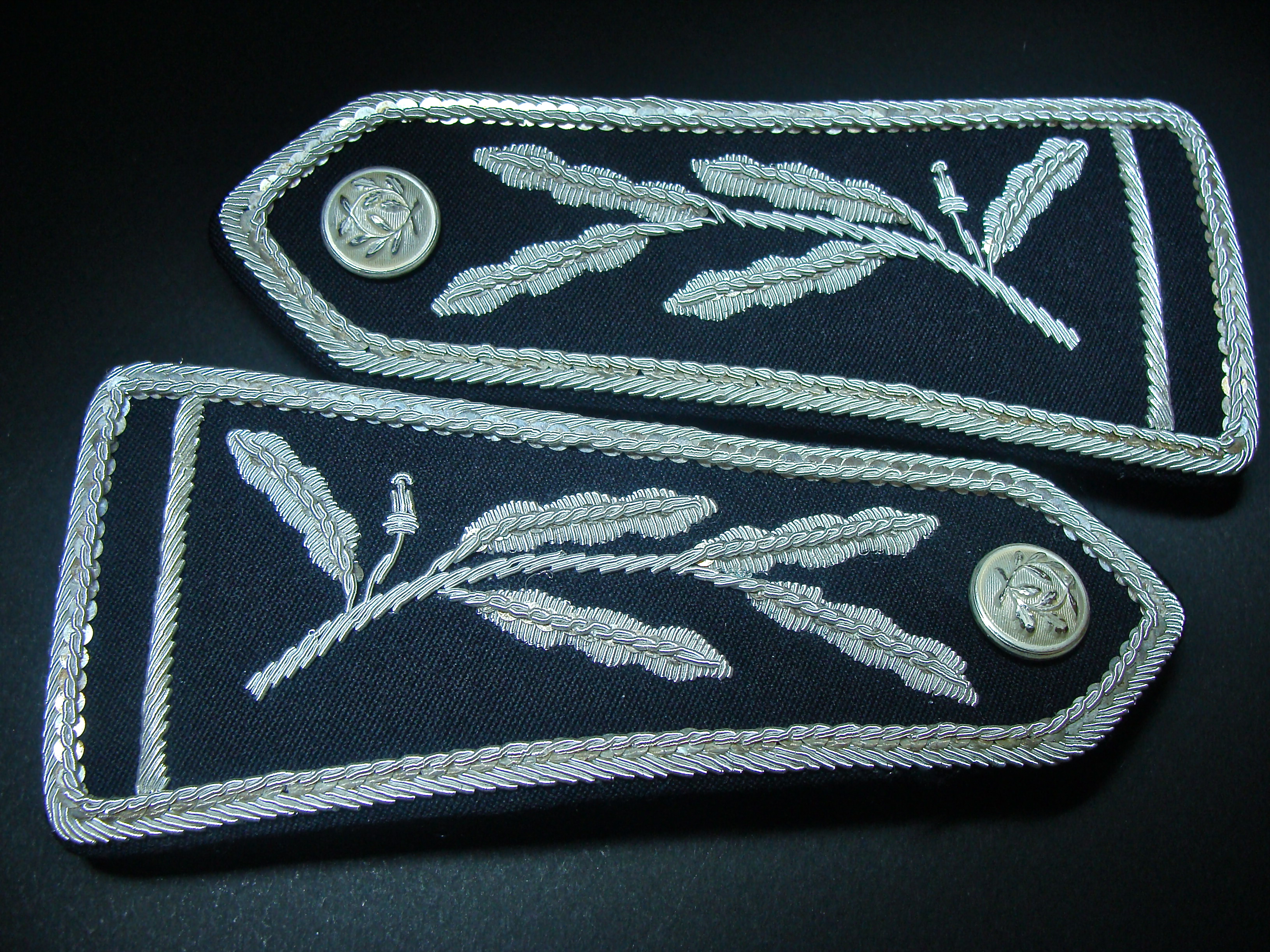
Insignia of a commissaire principal, which was abolished in 2006

The commissaires originated in Paris as the 48 commissaires enquêteurs-examinateurs of the Grand Châtelet.

Long before 1667, they had served as all-purpose agents of the Châtelet in the various quarters of Paris. But by choice and economic compulsion, they had increasingly forsaken their role of watchdogs of public security and had become somewhat discredited fee-grabbers, mainly concerned with such matters as imposing seals on the property of the deceased, taking legal inventories, serving summonses, and imposing a wide variety of fines on which they collected a lucrative percentage.

The first Lieutenant General of Police of Paris, Gabriel Nicolas de la Reynie, tried to reform the commissaires, persuading the king to increase salaries and retirement benefits and restore honors formerly attached to the office in the hopes of weaning them off the corrupting system of fees, but it was "a losing battle. In 1699 the old fee system was restored in the manner long demanded by the commissaires."

Whatever the shortcomings of the forty-eight commissaires, they remained the backbone of public order in Paris. Several kinds of armed, uniformed patrolmen theoretically circulated around the streets of Paris ... but in time of trouble the commissaire's house (practically all seventeenth-century officials did their work from their residences) loomed as large as Gibraltar. Ordinarily, a criminal case began with someone knocking on the door of the nearest commissaire and lodging a complaint against a fellow citizen. The commissaire's address was well known to residents of his quartier, and he was supposed to be available day and night to hear grievances and settle disputes. ... Each commissaire was assigned several sergents or huissiers to assist him in carrying out his civil duties — the only duties most commissaires really cared about, since they carried the most lucrative fees.

In the mid-eighteenth century, the commissaires "generally enjoyed the confidence of the people." Each of them was based in a particular area of the city and thus knew and was known to the local citizens; they were generally "well educated, usually with legal training, and their job was not only to keep order but also to protect public health and safety... The commissaires also played an important role as local notables. They convened meetings of inhabitants to elect people to look after the streetlights. They responded to public complaints about antisocial behavior..." They "returned to their owners goods that had been pawned at usurious rates of interest" and witnessed statements and complaints. "All of these matters gave the commissaire a very particular relationship with the public. He was, in a sense, at their service."

The commissaires de police became the linchpin of France’s urban police system after the French Revolution. "By the early years of the Restoration of the monarchy, most towns with more than five thousand inhabitants, as well as smaller municipalities on important trade routes or near frontiers, had at least one CP."

Before the creation of the National Police in 1941, every commune with a population of more than 5,000 had to have a commissaire by law, every commune with a population of more than 10,000 had to have two, and for every additional 10,000 people there had to be an additional commissaire. In a commune with more than one commissaire, the most senior, who acted as chief of police, was called the commissaire central.

The Paris Prefecture of Police had one commissaire for each quartier, plus one for each of the larger suburban communes in the Department of the Seine; the smaller suburban communes were grouped together under commissaires. There were also additional commissaires commanding specialist units in the Judicial Police. The Paris commissaire began his professional life as a secrétaire suppléant (assistant secretary), from which he was promoted, usually after about eighteen months if there was a vacancy, to secrétaire de police (secretary of police). Each commissaire was assisted by one of each of these officers. A secrétaire had to pass an examination for promotion to commissaire.

The Mobile Brigades of the Sûreté, formed in 1907, also used the rank of commissaire.
