= Post Tel Club =

Cambodian football club

Post Tel Club is a football club in Phnom Penh, Cambodia. It plays in the Division A1, the second division of Cambodian football. The club played in the top level Cambodian League in 2008 and 2009 then was relegated.
