= CMAC FC =

Cambodian football club

- Full name: Cambodian Mine Action Centre United Football Club
- Nickname: CMAC
- Founded: 2007; 19 years ago
- Dissolved: 2017
- Ground: Olympic Stadium (Phnom Penh)
- Capacity: 50,000
- Manager: Barnaart Jonkheer Willer Phillip
- Coach: Keo Narin
- League: Metfone C-League
- 2017: 11th (Relegated)
Home colours	Away colours

CMAC Football Club is a football club in Kampong Chhnang, Cambodia. It plays in the Metfone C-League, the top division of Cambodian football.

== Current squad ==
Note: Flags indicate national team as defined under FIFA eligibility rules; some limited exceptions apply. Players may hold more than one non-FIFA nationality.

No.	Pos.	Nation	Player
1	GK	CAM	Sos Proshim
3	DF	CAM	Khin Voeun
5	DF	CAM	Kamaruddin Suhaimy (captain)
6	DF	CAM	Nuth Pitu
8	MF	CAM	Ouk Pheng
9	FW	CAM	Um Tola
10	FW	CAM	Un Ghi
11	MF	CAM	Rous Hai
12	MF	CAM	Prom Yaneat
14	MF	AUS	Shuruma Lawrence

No.	Pos.	Nation	Player
15	DF	CAM	Kroch Mol
17	MF	CAM	Sin Mony Udom
18	MF	CAM	Keo Udom
20	DF	CAM	Sorn Sophinna
22	GK	CAM	Nhem Slayman
34	FW	JPN	Nobuki Nori
35	FW	CAM	Va Bottroi
42	FW	GHA	Michael Osei Tutu
43	DF	NGR	Kingsley Amamchuk
54	MF	KOR	An Seoung-eun
