= Asia Euro University =

Private university in Phnom Penh, Cambodia

- សាកលវិទ្យាល័យអាស៊ីអឺរ៉ុប
- Motto in English: Quality, Integrity, Opportunity
- Type: Private
- Established: 2005; 21 years ago
- President: H.E. Duong Leang
- Vice-president: Chhoeun Savorn
- Rector: Dr. Chea Sopheap
- Location: Phnom Penh, Cambodia
- Website: www.aeu.edu.kh

Asia Euro University (Khmer: សាកលវិទ្យាល័យអាស៊ីអឺរ៉ុប, Sakâlvĭtyéalai Asi Oerŏb) is a private university located in Phnom Penh, Cambodia. It was established in 2005 under sub-decree No. 05អនក្របក dated January 19, 2005.
