= Kouch Sokumpheak =

Cambodian footballer (born 1987)

Personal information
- Full name: Kouch Sokumpheak
- Date of birth: 15 February 1987 (age 39)
- Place of birth: Kampong Thom Province, People's Republic of Kampuchea (present-day Cambodia)
- Height: 1.68 m (5 ft 6 in)
- Position: Midfielder

Team information
- Current team: Nagaworld
- Number: 10

Youth career
- 2003–2004: Army Youth FC

Senior career*
Years	Team	Apps	(Gls)
2005–2010	Khemara Keila		
2010–2015	Phnom Penh Crown		
2015–	Nagaworld		

International career^{‡}
2006–	Cambodia	69	(7)
- * Club domestic league appearances and goals as of 4 May 2026 ‡ National team caps and goals as of 15 December 2021

Kouch Sokumpheak (Khmer: កួច សុកុម្ភ; born 15 February 1987) is a Cambodian professional footballer who plays as a midfielder for Cambodian Premier League club Nagaworld and the Cambodia national team.

== International career ==
=== International goals ===
Scores and results list Cambodia's goal tally first.

No.	Date	Venue	Opponent	Score	Result	Competition
1.	6 April 2006	Bangladesh Army Stadium, Dhaka, Bangladesh	Guam	3–0	3–0	2006 AFC Challenge Cup
2.	7 December 2008	Gelora Bung Karno Stadium, Jakarta, Indonesia	Myanmar	1–2	2–3	2008 AFF Championship
3.	25 March 2011	National Football Stadium, Malé, Maldives	Kyrgyzstan	2–2	3–4	2012 AFC Challenge Cup qualification
4.	25 March 2011	National Football Stadium, Malé, Maldives	Kyrgyzstan	3–4	3–4	2012 AFC Challenge Cup qualification
5.	29 June 2011	Phnom Penh Olympic Stadium, Phnom Penh, Cambodia	Laos	3–2	4–2	2014 FIFA World Cup qualification
6.	3 July 2011	New Laos National Stadium, Vientiane, Laos	Laos	2–4	2–6	2014 FIFA World Cup qualification
7.	6 June 2019	Phnom Penh Olympic Stadium, Phnom Penh, Cambodia	Pakistan	2–0	2–0	2022 FIFA World Cup qualification

== Honors ==
Khemara Keila

- Hun Sen Cup: 2007

Phnom Penh Crown

- Cambodian League: 2011, 2014
- AFC President's Cup runner-up: 2011

Nagaworld

- Cambodian League: 2018

Individual

- Hun Sen Cup Golden Boot: 2007, 2009, 2010
