= Wat Phnom FC =

Cambodian football club

Wat Phnom
- Full name: Wat Phnom Football Club
- League: Metfone C-League
- 2009: 8th

Wat Phnom Football Club, previously known as Spark FC is a football (soccer) club in Phnom Penh, Cambodia. It played in the Metfone C-League, the top division of Cambodian football.
