= Khoun Laboravy =

Cambodian footballer

Khoun Laboravy ឃួន ឡាបូរ៉ាវី
Personal information
- Full name: Khoun Laboravy
- Date of birth: 25 August 1988 (age 38)
- Place of birth: Kampong Cham, People's Republic of Kampuchea
- Height: 1.83 m (6 ft 0 in)
- Position: Striker

Senior career*
Years	Team	Apps	(Gls)
2008–2013	PKR Svay Rieng FC		(50)
2014–2019	Boeung Ket		(48)

International career
2009–2011	Cambodia U-23		
2008–2018	Cambodia	55	(12)
- * Club domestic league appearances and goals

Khoun Laboravy (Khmer: ឃួន ឡាបូរ៉ាវី; born 25 August 1988) is a Cambodian former footballer who last played for Boeung Ket in Cambodian League. Despite playing mostly as a striker, he has played in a wider position. During his career, he served as captain for both club and the Cambodia national team. Joining Boeung Ket in 2014, he helped the club become champion of the Metfone Cambodian League twice, in 2016 and 2017.

== Career ==
After spending 6 years with Svay Rieng-based club Preah Khan Reach Svay Rieng FC, Boravy moved Boeung Ket FC in 2015, where he was crowned captain and has since won 2 Cambodian League titles.

In early 2018 Boravy was heavily linked with Thai club Ratchaburi Mitr Phol F.C., where he was invited to a week long trial. But after much speculations from fans and media, the club instead chose to sign Filipino striker Mark Hartmann who was a free agent at the time, after being released by fellow Thai club Ubon UMT United F.C. Boravy ultimately signed for Thai League 3 side Surat Thani F.C.

== International goals ==
Scores and results list Cambodia's goal tally first.

#	Date	Venue	Opponent	Score	Result	Competition
1.	9 February 2011	Phnom Penh Olympic Stadium, Phnom Penh, Cambodia	Macau	3–0	3–1	2012 AFC Challenge Cup qualification
2.	29 June 2011	Phnom Penh Olympic Stadium, Phnom Penh, Cambodia	Laos	1–1	4–2	2014 FIFA World Cup qualification
3.	12 October 2014	New Laos National Stadium, Vientiane, Laos	Laos	1–2	2–3	2014 AFF Suzuki Cup qualification
4.	17 November 2014	Yishun Stadium, Yishun, Singapore	Singapore	1–1	2–4	Friendly
5.	17 November 2014	Yishun Stadium, Yishun, Singapore	Singapore	2–2	2–4	Friendly
6.	12 March 2015	Phnom Penh Olympic Stadium, Phnom Penh, Cambodia	Macau	3–0	3–0	2018 FIFA World Cup qualification
7.	2 June 2015	Phnom Penh Olympic Stadium, Phnom Penh, Cambodia	Laos	1–0	1–1	Friendly
8.	29 May 2016	Phnom Penh Olympic Stadium, Phnom Penh, Cambodia	Timor-Leste	2–0	2–0	Friendly
9.	14 January 2017	Zayed Sports City Stadium, Abu Dhabi, United Arab Emirates	Saudi Arabia	1–0	2–7	Friendly
10.	22 March 2017	Phnom Penh Olympic Stadium, Phnom Penh, Cambodia	India	1–1	2–3	Friendly
11.	21 March 2018	New Laos National Stadium, Vientiane, Laos	Laos	1–0	1–0	Friendly
12.	27 March 2018	Pamir Stadium, Dushanbe, Tajikistan	Afghanistan	1–2	1–2	2019 AFC Asian Cup qualification

== Honours ==
Svay Rieng

- Cambodian League: 2013
- Hun Sen Cup: 2011, 2012

Boeung Ket Angkor

- Cambodian League: 2016,2017
- Mekong Club Championship runner-up: 2015

Individual

- Cambodian League Golden Boot: 2013
- Hun Sen Cup Golden Boot: 2011, 2012, 2014, 2017
