= Nagaworld FC =

Association football club

Nagaworld ណាហ្គាវើលដ៍
- Full name: Nagaworld Football Club ណាហ្គាវើលដ៍ហ្វូតបលក្លឹប
- Nickname: Golden Dragon
- Founded: 2001; 25 years ago
- Ground: Kampong Speu Stadium; Kampong Speu Province
- Capacity: 3,000
- Chairman: Lee Wai Tuck Philip
- Manager: Ray Victor
- Coach: Khim Borey
- League: Cambodian Premier League
- 2025–26: Cambodian Premier League, 5th of 11
- Website: www.nagaworldfc.com
Home colours	Away colours

Nagaworld Football Club (Khmer: ក្លឹបបាល់ទាត់ណាហ្គាវើលដ៍, founded in 2001 as NagaCorp FC) is a professional football club based in Kampong Speu province. NagaWorld clinched its fourth Cambodian championship with a week to spare on 23 September 2018, having won the Kingdom's top tier title in 2004, 2007, 2009, and 2018. NagaWorld FC won the Samdech Hun Sen Cup in 2013 and won the KCC Pre-Season Tour in the 2022/23 season and 2023/2024 season. It has won 4 league titles and 1 Hun Sen Cup. Its women's section plays in the Cambodian Women's League.

== Players ==
Note: Flags indicate national team as defined under FIFA eligibility rules; some limited exceptions apply. Players may hold more than one non-FIFA nationality.

No.	Pos.	Nation	Player
1	GK	CAM	Reth Lyheng
3	DF	BRA	Matheus Mega
4	DF	CAM	Chhong Bunnath
5	DF	CAM	Hout Vanneth
7	FW	BRA	Lucas Venuto
8	MF	CAM	Vann Tailamey
10	MF	CAM	Ean Pisey
11	FW	CAM	Mohammath Hamisi
12	MF	CAM	Sos Suhana (captain)
14	MF	JPN	Sonosuke Onda
15	MF	CAM	Uk Devin
16	FW	CAM	Seth Mahamatsales
18	GK	CAM	Touth Sarouth
19	FW	CAM	Im Som Oun
20	FW	BRA	Kibe

No.	Pos.	Nation	Player
21	DF	CAM	Reth Kattamy
22	MF	CAM	Lucas Arthur (on loan from PKR Svay Rieng)
23	DF	CAM	Nen Sothearoth
26	DF	CAM	Chea Sokmeng
27	MF	CAM	Nat Sinan
29	MF	CAM	Phoy Phanna
30	MF	CAM	Foeut Falah
31	GK	CAM	Sambath Samnang
33	GK	CAM	Seng Sovanara
63	MF	CAM	Tin Ladin
70	FW	BRA	Filipe Vasconcelos
77	DF	BRA	Rafael Klein
79	DF	CAM	Phat Sokha (vice-captain)
99	FW	BRA	Bernardo Diniz

=== Out on loan ===
Note: Flags indicate national team as defined under FIFA eligibility rules; some limited exceptions apply. Players may hold more than one non-FIFA nationality.

No.	Pos.	Nation	Player
—	MF	CAM	Kouch Sokumpheak (to (Cambodia) ISI Dangkor Senchey)
6	MF	CAM	It Sony (to (Cambodia) Phnom Penh City)

== Staff ==
Position	Staff
General manager	(Cambodia) Ray Victor
General secretary	(Singapore) Yeo Wee Han
Technical director	(South Korea) Lee Lim-saeng
Head coach	(Cambodia) Khim Borey
Team manager	(Cambodia) Ya Portry
Assistant coach	(Japan) Kento Fujihara (Cambodia) Sun Sopanha (Cambodia) Chin Chum
Goalkeeper coach	(Cameroon) Ulrich Munze
Fitness coach	(Malaysia) Mohd Aidil Idham Bin Fadzil Halmi
Kit manager	(Cambodia) Samrith Samnang
Video analysis	(Cambodia) Sokha Devith
Doctor	(Cambodia) Soeuth Ratanak
Physiotherapists	(Cambodia) Hay Sakiry

== Record ==
=== Continental ===
Season	Competition	Round	Club	Home	Away	Position
2005	ASEAN Club Championship	Group A	(Timor-Leste) FC Zebra	3–0		4th
2005	ASEAN Club Championship	Group A	(Vietnam) Hoàng Anh Gia Lai	1–5		4th
2005	ASEAN Club Championship	Group A	(Malaysia) Pahang	0–3		4th
2008	AFC President's Cup	Group B	(Chinese Taipei) Taipower FC	2–2		2nd
2008	AFC President's Cup	Group B	(Kyrgyzstan) Dordoi-Dynamo	0–2		2nd
2010	AFC President's Cup	Group B	(Pakistan) KRL	1–2		3rd
2010	AFC President's Cup	Group B	(Sri Lanka) Renown Sports Club	4–2		3rd
2010	AFC President's Cup	Group B	(Tajikistan) Vakhsh Qurghonteppa	0–3		3rd
2017	AFC Cup	Qualifying Round; Group B	(Nepal) Three Star Club	1–1		3rd
2017	AFC Cup	Qualifying Round; Group B	(Mongolia) Erchim	0–1		3rd
2019	AFC Cup	Group F	(Vietnam) Hanoi FC	1–5	0–10	4th
2019	AFC Cup	Group F	(Myanmar) Yangon United	2–1	0–2	4th
2019	AFC Cup	Group F	(Singapore) Tampines Rovers	1–5	2–4	4th

=== Invitational tournament ===
Season	Tournament	Round	Club	Home	Away	Aggregate
2014	Singapore Cup	Preliminary Round	(Singapore) Home United	5–0		
2016	Singapore Cup	Preliminary Round	(Philippines) Global FC	0–5		
2017	Singapore Cup	Preliminary Round	(Singapore) Balestier Khalsa	3–4		
2017	Singapore Cup	Quarter-final	(Singapore) Hougang United	0–4	4–1	1–8

=== Domestic ===
- Cambodian Premier League
  - 2004, 2007, 2009, 2018
  - Runners-Up: 2006, 2011, 2012, 2015
- Hun Sen Cup
  - Winners: 2013
  - Runners-up: 2007, 2009, 2012, 2015, 2017, 2020

== Head coaches ==
Name	Nat	Period	Tournament
Prak Sovannara	(Cambodia)	2009–2012	
Lim Noun	(Cambodia)	2012–2013	2013 Hun Sen Cup winner
Prak Sovannara	(Cambodia)	2013–2014	
Meas Channa	(Cambodia)	2014–2021	2018 Cambodian League winner
Khim Borey	(Cambodia)	2022–	

== Captains ==
Captain by Years

Years	Captain	Nationality	Vice-captain	Nationality
2015	Masahiro Fukasawa	(Japan) Japanese	Kouch Sokumpheak	(Cambodia) Cambodian
2016	Masahiro Fukasawa	(Japan) Japanese	Kouch Sokumpheak	(Cambodia) Cambodian
2017	Kouch Sokumpheak	(Cambodia) Cambodian	Khim Borey, Nhim Sovannara	(Cambodia) Cambodian
2018	Kouch Sokumpheak	(Cambodia) Cambodian	Khim Borey, Nhim Sovannara	(Cambodia) Cambodian
2019	Kouch Sokumpheak	(Cambodia) Cambodian	Khim Borey, Nhim Sovannara	(Cambodia) Cambodian
2020	Kouch Sokumpheak	(Cambodia) Cambodian	Khim Borey	(Cambodia) Cambodian
2021	Kouch Sokumpheak	(Cambodia) Cambodian	Sou Yaty	(Cambodia) Cambodian
2022	Kouch Sokumpheak	(Cambodia) Cambodian	Sou Yaty	(Cambodia) Cambodian
2023	Kouch Sokumpheak	(Cambodia) Cambodian	Sos Suhana	(Cambodia) Cambodian
