= National Defense Ministry FC =

Association football club

RCAF ក្លឹបបាល់ទាត់កងយោធពលខេមរភូមិន្ទ
- Full name: Royal Cambodian Armed Forces Football Club
- Nicknames: The Army; Hanuman
- Founded: 1982; 44 years ago, as Ministry of Defence
- Ground: RCAF Old Stadium
- Capacity: 8,000
- Chairman: Supachai Verapuchong
- Manager: Hor Sokheng
- Coach: Phea Sopheaktra
- League: Cambodian Premier League
- 2025–26: Cambodian Premier League, 9th of 11
Home colours	Away colours

Royal Cambodian Armed Forces Football Club (Khmer: ក្លឹបបាល់ទាត់កងយោធពលខេមរភូមិន្ទ), also referred to as RCAF, is a professional football club based in Phnom Penh, Cambodia. The club competes in the Cambodian Premier League, the top tier of Cambodian football. Directly represented the Royal Cambodian Armed Forces, it is one of the oldest, most culturally significant, and most decorated institutions in the history of the domestic game.

== History ==
Originally founded in 1982 as Ministry of Defence, the team changed its name to Royal Cambodian Armed Forces Football Club after the restoration of monarchy in 1993 and renamed again in 2008 to Ministry of National Defence Football Club. In 2020 it was announced that the club would return to the name of Royal Cambodian Armed Forces Football Club (RCAF) and would take on the nickname Tiffy Army due to sponsorship reasons.

For a six-year period between 2020 and 2025, the club was widely recognized under the commercial moniker, Tiffy Army due to sponsorship reasons. Following the conclusion of this partnership, the club moved forward from its commercial branding to shift its focus entirely back to its long-standing historic roots. In 2025, Tiffy Army would change their name back to Royal Cambodian Armed Forces (RCAF) ahead of the 2025–26 season.

== Stadium ==
RCAF's home ground is the RCAF Old Stadium, which has the capacity of 8000 spectators. The stadium has served as the club's permanent home ground since 1982 and underwent major infrastructure upgrades in 2024 to add professional-grade LED floodlights, modernized team facilities, and structural renovations to the main grandstand.

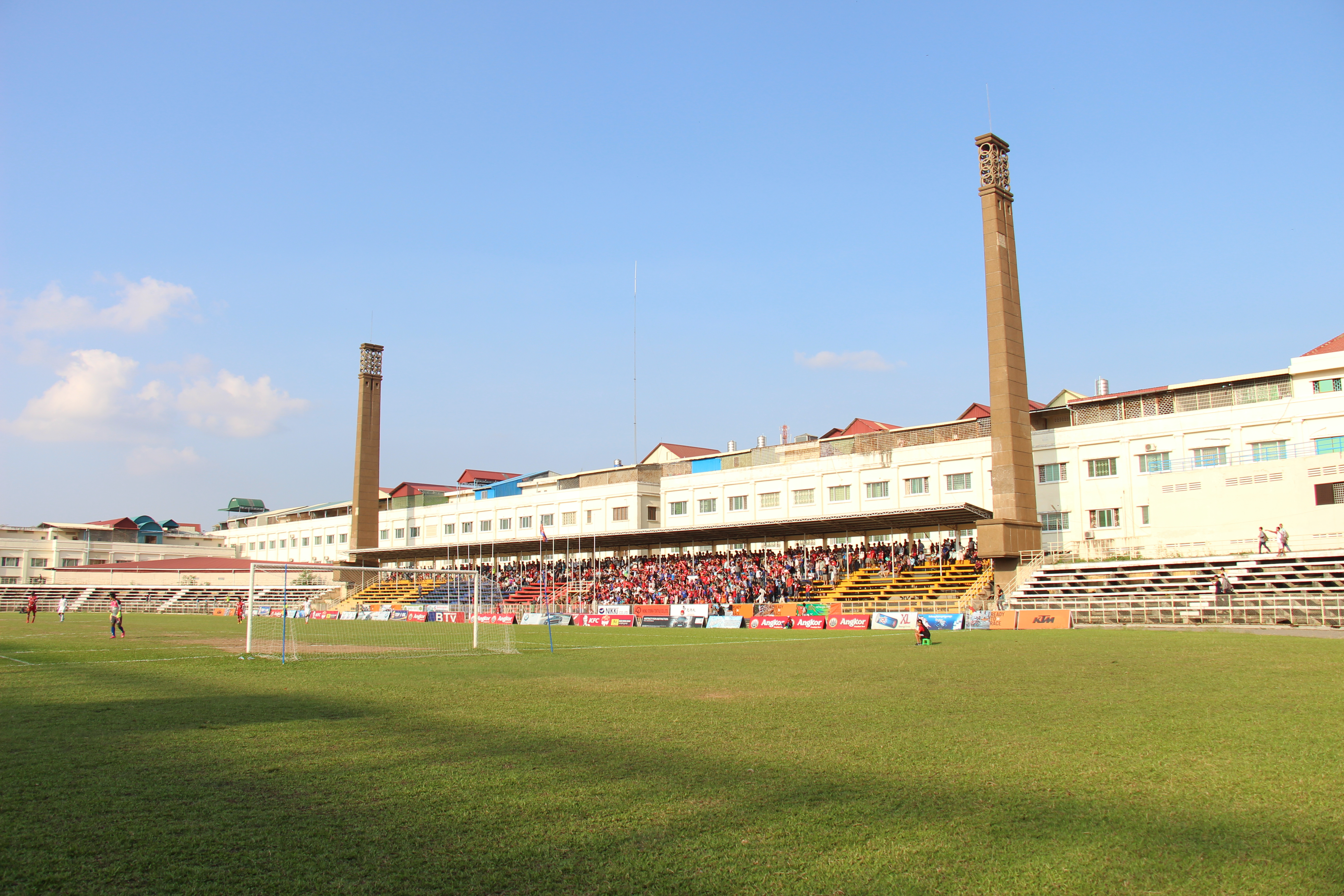
RCAF Old Stadium

== Players ==
=== Current squad ===
Note: Flags indicate national team as defined under FIFA eligibility rules; some limited exceptions apply. Players may hold more than one non-FIFA nationality.

No.	Pos.	Nation	Player
1	GK	CAM	Mat Lany
2	DF	CAM	Oem Vinun
3	DF	CAM	Vorn Phalla
4	DF	CAM	Buth Rotha
5	DF	JPN	Naoki Takasu
6	DF	CAM	Soung Sokleng
7	MF	CAM	Choeun Nacha
8	FW	JPN	Tetsuaki Misawa (captain)
9	FW	POR	Josemar Agostinho
10	MF	CIV	Moussa Bakayoko
11	DF	CAM	Nat Sangha
12	FW	CAM	Chun Sinoeun
14	FW	CAM	Zen Saly
15	DF	CAM	Suk Vatana
16	DF	CAM	Touch Soktey

No.	Pos.	Nation	Player
17	MF	CAM	Yim Kakada
18	MF	CAM	Chhoem Panhvorn
20	MF	CAM	Tep Filib
21	FW	CAM	Dav Nim
22	GK	CAM	Um Sereyroth
23	FW	CAM	Sreng Sokea
24	FW	CAM	Mustapha Ashnarvy
25	MF	CAM	Thorng Da
27	GK	CAM	Pich Dara
30	GK	CAM	Mao Narith
32	DF	CAM	Chhun Mengleav
77	DF	USA	Srey Schylar No
88	MF	SLE	Umaru Samura
99	FW	CAM	Chhai Horhong

=== Reserve team and Youth Academy ===
Compete in Cambodian League 2

As of 16 September 2023

Note: Flags indicate national team as defined under FIFA eligibility rules; some limited exceptions apply. Players may hold more than one non-FIFA nationality.

No.	Pos.	Nation	Player
2	DF	CAM	Chim Chandaro
4	DF	CAM	Buth Ratha
5	DF	CAM	Heng Senghorng
7	FW	CAM	Chanvibol Davit
8	MF	CAM	Chong Sovanpanha
9	FW	CAM	Chun Sinoeun
10	FW	CAM	Mut Sopheang
11	FW	CAM	Sreng Sokea
12	FW	CAM	Ty Nareach
14	MF	CAM	Ly Tochita
15	DF	CAM	Suk Vatana
16	FW	CAM	Cho So Visal
17	FW	CAM	Choeun Nacha
18	MF	CAM	Tong Sambath

No.	Pos.	Nation	Player
19	DF	CAM	Lay Hengly
20	MF	CAM	Tep Filib
21	MF	CAM	Leang Pisey
22	GK	CAM	Mat Lany
23	MF	CAM	Meas Liza
24	MF	CAM	Khorn Narong
25	DF	CAM	Chirk Chengly
28	MF	CAM	Son Sovanpanha
29	FW	CAM	Sa Usos
30	GK	CAM	Sopheap Thaiyuth
31	DF	CAM	Touch Soktey
32	DF	CAM	Vorn Phalla
33	DF	CAM	Lun Mengleang

== Management and staff ==
As of 27 September 2024

Position	Name
Team manager	(Cambodia) Hor Sokheng
Head coach	(Cambodia) Phea Sopheaktra
Assistant coach	(Cambodia) Pom Tola (Cambodia) Pak Siya (Cambodia) Lorn Sotheara
Goalkeeper coach	(Cambodia) Thong Chanraksmey
Fitness coach	(Cambodia) Yeum Navan (Cambodia) Khek Khemarin
Club doctor	(Cambodia) Ny Leakhana (Cambodia) Ny Sotheavy

== Honours ==
Type	Honours	Titles	Season
Domestic	Cambodian Premier League	3	1985, 1986, 1993
Domestic	Hun Sen Cup	3	2010, 2016, 2018
Others	Asia Clubs Pre-season Championship	1	2017
Others	Kunming, China Pre-Season Championship	1	2018
Others	ASEAN Army Championship (4th Place)	1	2004
