= Kirivong Sok Sen Chey F.C. =

Association football club in Cambodia

Kirivong Sok Sen Chey គិរីវង់សុខសែនជ័យ
- Full name: Kirivong Sok Sen Chey Football Club
- Nickname: The Roosters
- Founded: 2007; 19 years ago
- Ground: Kirivong Sok Sen Chey Stadium
- Capacity: 1,000
- Chairman: Sok Puthyvuth
- Head coach: Alistair Heath
- League: Cambodian Premier League
- 2025–26: Cambodian Premier League, 8th of 11
Home colours	Away colours

Kirivong Sok Sen Chey Football Club (Khmer: គិរីវង់សុខសែនជ័យ) is a professional football club based in Takeo Province, Cambodia.

== History ==
After withdrawal from the 2016 Cambodian League season, the team competed in the 2016 Cambodian Second League. It won promotion and rejoined the 2017 Cambodian League, then was relegated again.

After a one-year hiatus, it was announced by the Football Federation of Cambodia that the team was invited to compete in the 2019 Cambodian League.

== Players ==
Note: Flags indicate national team as defined under FIFA eligibility rules; some limited exceptions apply. Players may hold more than one non-FIFA nationality.

No.	Pos.	Nation	Player
1	GK	WAL	Adam Przybek
4	DF	CAM	Em Chhumsideth
5	DF	CAM	Oeun Dy
6	MF	CAM	Sros Rayuth
7	FW	CAM	Huy Sophearak
8	DF	CAM	Hikaru Mizuno
10	MF	CAM	Kouch Dani
11	DF	ENG	Louis Hall
12	DF	CAM	Ath Ountoch
13	DF	CAM	Chou Hav
15	DF	CAM	Koeut Meas
17	MF	CAM	Lim Visal (on loan from Phnom Penh Crown)
18	MF	CAM	Dor Rozzan

No.	Pos.	Nation	Player
19	MF	CAM	Touch Manoch (on loan from Boeung Ket)
23	MF	CAM	Soeng Sombo Rithy
24	DF	CAM	Sao Vaify (Vice-captain)
33	GK	CAM	Lang Bunleap
45	GK	CAM	Sou Sovaneat
46	FW	CAM	Hang Dalik
58	MF	CAM	Kong Lyhour
70	FW	CMR	Louis Willy Ndongo
77	FW	CAM	Sot Monyrothanak (on loan from Phnom Penh Crown)
87	MF	SUI	Sinclair Baddy Dega
97	FW	CRO	Jacob Tarasenko
99	DF	USA	Jonny Campbell (captain)

=== Players with multiple nationalities ===
- (France) (Cambodia) Kouch Dani
- (Vietnam) (Cambodia) Chou Hav
- (Australia) (Croatia) Jacob Tarasenko
- (Guadeloupe) (Switzerland) Sinclair Baddy Dega

== Staff ==
Position	Name
General manager	(Cambodia) Kak Mesa
Head coach	(England) Alistair Heath
Assistant coach	(Cameroon) Jean Botioba (Cambodia) Huon Socannpisak (Cambodia) Soch Roththa (Cambodia) Our Pisak
Goalkeeper coach	(Slovakia) Oliver Seman
Fitness coach	(Cambodia) Khat Ra
Physiotherapist	(Cambodia) Lot Hoeun
