= Preah Khan Reach Svay Rieng FC =

Association football club in Cambodia

Preah Khan Reach Svay Rieng ព្រះខ័នរាជស្វាយរៀង
- Full name: Preah Khan Reach Svay Rieng Football Club
- Nickname: The Blue Swords
- Short name: PKR
- Founded: 1997; 29 years ago as Preah Khan Reach; 2013; 13 years ago as Preah Khan Reach Svay Rieng
- Ground: Svay Rieng Stadium; Morodok Techo National Stadium (selected matches)
- Capacity: 7,500; 60,000
- Chairman: Dy Vichea
- Head coach: Mattew McConkey
- League: Cambodian Premier League
- 2025–26: Cambodian Premier League, 1st of 11 (champions)
- Website: pkrsvayriengfc.com
Home colours	Away colours	Third colours

Preah Khan Reach Svay Rieng Football Club (Khmer: ក្លឹបបាល់ទាត់ព្រះខ័នរាជស្វាយរៀង), also known as PKR Svay Rieng, is a professional football club based in Krong Svay Rieng, Svay Rieng province, Cambodia, that plays in the Cambodian Premier League.

The club has won 5 Cambodian Premier League titles and 6 Hun Sen Cup and 3 Cambodian Super Cup in the club history. Continentally, Svay Rieng has reached 2 finals of the AFC Challenge League on back to back basis but has yet won the final.

== History ==
The club was founded in 1997 by General Sao Sokha, and was originally based in Phnom Penh, under the name Preah Khan Reach. In 2011, the club won their first major honour, the 2011 Hun Sen Cup, after beating Build Bright United by 2–0. Sam El Nasa and Khoun Laboravy scored the goals. The club managed to retain their title in the 2012 Hun Sen Cup after winning against Nagacorp by 2–1. In May 2013, the club was renamed as Preah Khan Reach Svay Rieng, when the decision was made to relocate to Svay Rieng by Dy Vichea. In the first season under the new name, they ended up becoming the 2013 Cambodian League champions. The club automatically qualified for the 2014 AFC President's Cup, being placed against Nepali Manang Marshyangdi Club and Mongolian Erchim. However, Svay Rieng lost both of their fixtures and finished last in the group table.

In 2019, Svay Rieng won their second league title and qualified to the 2020 AFC Cup qualifying play-offs, playing against Laos side Master 7. Svay Rieng ended up winning both of the qualifying matches with 7–1 on aggregate and qualified to the group stage. The club was then placed in Group G alongside Philippines club Ceres–Negros, Indonesian club Bali United and Vietnamese club Than Quảng Ninh. On 25 February 2020, the club recorded their first win in the AFC competitions after defeating Bali United by 2–1. However, due to the rising cases of the COVID-19 pandemic, the tournament was cancelled.

=== Three-peat league champions and back to back AFC Challenge League finals (2023–2026) ===
Svay Rieng then won their third league title during the 2023–24 season, qualified for the 2024–25 AFC Challenge League and also participated in the returning 2024–25 ASEAN Club Championship. The club faced off against Lao side Young Elephants in the ASEAN Club Championship play-off round where they won 8–3 on aggregate, thus qualifying to Group A alongside Malaysian Terengganu, Thai BG Pathum United, Indonesian PSM Makassar, Vietnamese Đông Á Thanh Hóa and Myanmar Shan United. On 21 August 2024, Svay Rieng won 3–2 against Terengganu at the Sultan Mizan Zainal Abidin Stadium. Svay Rieng was knocked out of the competition after failing to qualify to the next round.

In the 2024–25 AFC Challenge League, Svay Rieng were placed alongside Indonesian side Madura United and Mongolian side SP Falcons in the group stage. The club won 2–1 against SP Falcons and lost 2-1 to Madura, but still qualified for the quarter-finals as group runners-up. In the quarter-finals, Svay Rieng faced Myanmar's Shan United, ultimately winning 7–4 on aggregate, and in the semi-finals they defeated Madura United 6–3 on aggregate. In what was Svay Rieng's first continental final, they faced FK Arkadag of Turkmenistan but lost to the Turkmen side 2–1 after extra time. Svay Rieng then went on to retain the league title for three times in row during the 2025–26 season where the club also went on to win a domestic double after winning the 2025–26 Hun Sen Cup after defeating Visakha in the final.

== Kit manufacturers and shirt sponsors ==
Period	Kit manufacturer	Shirt sponsors
2015–2018	(Thailand) FBT	ORKIDĒ; Carabao Energy Drink
2019–2025	(Thailand) FBT	ORKIDĒ
2025–present	(Spain) Kelme	ORKIDĒ; Krud Energy Drink; V-Active Sports; Hanuman Beverages

== Players ==
=== First-team squad ===
As of August 2026

Note: Flags indicate national team as defined under FIFA eligibility rules; some limited exceptions apply. Players may hold more than one non-FIFA nationality.

No.	Pos.	Nation	Player
1	GK	CAM	Sang Hankhun
2	DF	BRA	Mateus Barbosa
3	DF	CAM	Takaki Ose
4	DF	MAR	Faris Hammouti
5	DF	CAM	Soeuy Visal (captain)
6	MF	POR	Rui Pires
7	FW	POR	Tiago Alves
8	MF	BRA	Breno Caetano
9	FW	CAM	Sieng Chanthea
10	FW	CAM	Nhean Sosidan
11	MF	CAM	Min Ratanak
12	DF	CAM	Poy Visa
13	DF	CAM	Sareth Krya
14	FW	CAM	Sovan Dauna
16	MF	CAM	Kim Sokyuth
17	MF	CAM	Meak Cheareaksa
18	GK	CAM	Aim Sovannarath
19	DF	CAM	Seut Baraing

No.	Pos.	Nation	Player
21	FW	BRA	Martins Júnior
22	FW	CAM	Chantha Chanteaka
23	MF	CAM	Chin Nareak
24	FW	CAM	Ky Rina
25	MF	CAM	Chou Sinti
27	GK	CAM	Vireak Dara
28	MF	JPN	Ryo Fujii
30	FW	NGR	Ofufu Ibeh
31	GK	CAM	Lon Vathana
33	DF	CAM	Var David
35	DF	CAM	Sophal Dimong
37	MF	AUT	Johannes Tartarotti
45	FW	CAM	Narong Kakada
46	FW	GHA	Kwame Peprah
61	MF	JPN	Takashi Odawara
96	MF	NED	Silvester van der Water
97	FW	SCO	Connor Shields

=== Out on loan ===
Note: Flags indicate national team as defined under FIFA eligibility rules; some limited exceptions apply. Players may hold more than one non-FIFA nationality.

No.	Pos.	Nation	Player
—	MF	CAM	Lucas Arthur (to (Cambodia) Nagaworld)

=== Players with multiple nationalities ===
- (Netherlands) (Morocco) Faris Hammouti
- (Austria) (Italy) Johannes Tartarotti
- (Japan) (Cambodia) Takaki Ose
- (Nigeria) (Portugal) Ofufu Ibeh

== Management and staff ==
As of July 2026

Management
Position	Name
Chairman	(Cambodia) Dy Vichea
Technical director	(Cambodia) Rith Dyka
General manager	(Scotland) Christopher Grant
Team manager	(Cambodia) Kheng Sopagna

Technical staff
Position	Name
Head coach	(Republic of Ireland) Matthew McConkey
Assistant coach	(Cambodia) Chea Samnang
Assistant coach	(Poland) Grzegorz Zurek
Individual development coach	(India) Vedant Malik
Goalkeeper coach	(Republic of Ireland) Ronan McCarthy
Strength and conditioning coach	(Cambodia) Lay Raksmey
Strength and conditioning coach	(England) Ben Knight
Video analyst	(England) Sidney Kavanagh
Video analyst	(Cambodia) Sok Ratha
Video analyst	(Cambodia) Ang Botta
Video analyst	(Scotland) Dougie Anderson
Physiotherapist	(Croatia) Davor Puljić
Physiotherapist	(Cambodia) Song Kimthy
Physiotherapist	(Australia) Joshua van Kalken
Kitman	(Cambodia) Soun Thoun
Kitman	(Cambodia) Ly Mengtea
Media manager	(Cambodia) Choeum Samdy

== Honours ==
Type	Honours	Titles	Seasons
League	Cambodian Premier League	5	2013, 2019, 2023–24, 2024–25, 2025–26
Cup	Hun Sen Cup	6	2011, 2012, 2015, 2017, 2023–24, 2025–26
Cup	Cambodian Super Cup	3	2024, 2025, 2026

Bold is for those competition that are currently active.

=== Continental ===
- AFC Challenge League
  - Runners-up (2): 2024–25, 2025–26

== Award winners ==
=== Domestic ===
- Player of the Season
  - (Cambodia) Khoun Laboravy (2013)
  - (Cameroon) Privat Mbarga (2019, 2021)
  - (Canada) Marcus Haber (2022, 2023–24)
  - (Ghana) Kwame Peprah (2025–26)
- Top Scorer
  - (Cambodia) Khoun Laboravy (2013)
  - (Nigeria) Dzarma Bata (2014)
  - (Cameroon) Privat Mbarga (2019, 2020)
  - (Canada) Marcus Haber (2022, 2023–24)
  - (Ghana) Kwame Peprah (2025–26)
- Coach of the Season
  - (Cambodia) Sam Vandet (2013)
  - (Republic of Ireland) Conor Nestor (2019)
  - (Spain) Pep Muñoz (2023–24, 2024–25)
  - (Republic of Ireland) Matthew McConkey (2025–26)
- Goalkeeper of the Season
  - (Cambodia) Aim Sovannarath (2013, 2019)
  - (Cambodia) Vireak Dara (2023–24, 2024–25, 2025–26)
- Team of the Season
  - (Cambodia) Sareth Krya (2025–26)
  - (Brazil) Patrick Robson (2025–26)
  - (Ghana) Kwame Peprah (2025–26)

== Notable players ==
=== International capped players ===
AFC/OFC.: (Laos) Bounphachan Bounkong	CAF.: (Ghana) Kwame Peprah; (Morocco) Faris Hammouti; (Rwanda) Atuheire Kipson	UEFA.: (Austria) Johannes Tartarotti; (Portugal) Rui Pires; (Scotland) Harley Willard	CONMEBOL/ CONCACAF.: (Canada) Marcus Haber; (Trinidad and Tobago) Trevin Caesar

== Managerial history ==
Name	Seasons	Achievements
(Cambodia) Prak Sovannara	20 December 2008 – 15 December 2010	
(Cambodia) Sam Vandeth	January 2011 – December 2017	– 2011, 2012, 2015, 2017 Hun Sen Cup – 2013 Cambodian League
(Republic of Ireland) Conor Nestor	January 2018 – 4 May 2023	– 2019 Cambodian League
(Spain) Pep Muñoz	6 May 2023 – 25 May 2025	– 2023–24, 2024–25 Cambodian Premier League – 2023–24 Hun Sen Cup – 2024 Cambodian Super Cup – 2024–25 AFC Challenge League runners-up
(Republic of Ireland) Mattew McConkey	3 June 2025 – present	– 2025–26 Cambodian Premier League – 2025 Cambodian Super Cup – 2025–26 AFC Challenge League runners-up – 2025–26 Hun Sen Cup – 2026 Cambodia Super Cup

== Club captains ==
Captains by years

Years	Captain
2009–2011	(Cambodia) Sam El Nasa
2012–2013	(Cambodia) Tum Saray
2014–2018	(Cambodia) Prak Mony Udom
2019–present	(Cambodia) Soeuy Visal

== Performance in AFC club competitions ==
Season	Competition	Round	Club	Home	Away	Aggregate
2014	AFC President's Cup	Group C	(Nepal) Manang Marshyangdi Club	3–6		3rd
2014	AFC President's Cup	Group C	(Mongolia) Erchim	1–3		3rd
2020	AFC Cup	Qualifying play-off round	(Laos) Master 7	4–1	3–0	7–1
2020	AFC Cup	Group G	(Philippines) Ceres–Negros	Cancelled	0–4	3rd
2020	AFC Cup	Group G	(Indonesia) Bali United	2–1	Cancelled	3rd
2020	AFC Cup	Group G	(Vietnam) Than Quảng Ninh	1–4	Cancelled	3rd
2024–25	AFC Challenge League	Group E	(Mongolia) SP Falcons	2–1		2nd
2024–25	AFC Challenge League	Group E	(Indonesia) Madura United	1–2		2nd
2024–25	AFC Challenge League	Quarter-finals	(Myanmar) Shan United	6–2	1–2	7–4
2024–25	AFC Challenge League	Semi-finals	(Indonesia) Madura United	3–0	3–3	6–3
2024–25	AFC Challenge League	Final	(Turkmenistan) Arkadag	1–2 (a.e.t.)		
2025–26	AFC Challenge League	Group D	(Mongolia) SP Falcons	3–0		1st
2025–26	AFC Challenge League	Group D	(Laos) Ezra	3–0		1st
2025–26	AFC Challenge League	Group D	(Philippines) Manila Digger	2–2		1st
2025–26	AFC Challenge League	Quarter-finals	(Cambodia) Phnom Penh Crown	2–1	4–1	6–2
2025–26	AFC Challenge League	Semi-finals	(Philippines) Manila Digger	1–1	3–0	4–1
2025–26	AFC Challenge League	Final	Al-Kuwait	3–4 (a.e.t.)		
2026–27	AFC Champions League Two	Group G	(Japan) Machida Zelvia		0–2	
2026–27	AFC Champions League Two	Group G	(China) Shanghai Shenhua	0–0		
2026–27	AFC Champions League Two	Group G	(Singapore) Tampines Rovers	2–0	5–1	

== Performance in AFF club competitions ==
Season	Competition	Round	Club	Home	Away	Aggregate
2024–25	ASEAN Club Championship	Play-off round	(Laos) Young Elephants	5–1	3–2	8–3
2024–25	ASEAN Club Championship	Group A	(Malaysia) Terengganu	—N/a	3–2	3rd out of 6
2024–25	ASEAN Club Championship	Group A	(Thailand) BG Pathum United	—N/a	1–2	3rd out of 6
2024–25	ASEAN Club Championship	Group A	(Indonesia) PSM Makassar	0–1	—N/a	3rd out of 6
2024–25	ASEAN Club Championship	Group A	(Vietnam) Đông Á Thanh Hóa	—N/a	0–0	3rd out of 6
2024–25	ASEAN Club Championship	Group A	(Myanmar) Shan United	4–2	—N/a	3rd out of 6
2025–26	ASEAN Club Championship	Group B	(Myanmar) Shan United	—N/a	3–0	3rd out of 6
2025–26	ASEAN Club Championship	Group B	(Vietnam) Nam Định	—N/a	1–2	3rd out of 6
2025–26	ASEAN Club Championship	Group B	(Malaysia) Johor Darul Ta'zim	2–2	—N/a	3rd out of 6
2025–26	ASEAN Club Championship	Group B	(Thailand) Bangkok United	1–1	—N/a	3rd out of 6
2025–26	ASEAN Club Championship	Group B	(Singapore) Lion City Sailors	—N/a	2–0	3rd out of 6
2026–27	ASEAN Club Championship	Group B	(Malaysia) Johor Darul Ta'zim	—N/a	0–6	
2026–27	ASEAN Club Championship	Group B	(Thailand) Port	4–1	—N/a	
2026–27	ASEAN Club Championship	Group B	(Vietnam) Công An Hà Nội	—N/a		
2026–27	ASEAN Club Championship	Group B	(Singapore) Lion City Sailors		—N/a	
2026–27	ASEAN Club Championship	Group B	(Indonesia) Persib Bandung		—N/a	
2026–27	ASEAN Club Championship	Group B	(Myanmar) Shan United	—N/a		

== Invitational tournament record ==
Season	Tournament	Round	Club	Home	Away	Aggregate
2014	Singapore Cup	Preliminary round	(Japan) Albirex Niigata (S)	3–0		
2015	Singapore Cup	Preliminary round	(Japan) Albirex Niigata (S)	2–1		
