= Build Bright United FC =

Cambodian football club

Build Bright United
- Full name: Build Bright United Football Club
- Nickname: Build Bright
- Founded: 2007; 18 years ago
- Dissolved: 2016
- Ground: Olympic Stadium (Phnom Penh); Phnom Penh, Cambodia
- Capacity: 50,000
Home colours

Build Bright United Football Club was a football club based in Phnom Penh, Cambodia. It played in the Cambodian-League, the top division of Cambodian football. The club was dissolved in 2016 due to financial problems.

== See also ==
- Build Bright University
