= 2016 Cambodian League =

Cambodian association football season

Cambodian League
- Season: 2016
- Champions: Boeung Ket Angkor (2nd)
- AFC Cup: Boeung Ket Angkor
- Matches: 90
- Goals: 336 (3.73 per match)
- Top goalscorer: Chan Vathanaka (22 goals)
- Biggest home win: Preah Khan Reach Svay Rieng 7-1 Western Phnom Penh (6 September )
- Biggest away win: CMAC United 0-7 Boeung Ket Angkor (4 March )
- Highest scoring: Preah Khan Reach Svay Rieng 6-2 CMAC United (21 February ), National Police Commissary 1-7 Boeung Ket Angkor (8 May ) pp, CMAC United 3-5 Preah Khan Reach Svay Rieng (19 June ), National Defense Ministry 6-2 Western Phnom Penh (24 July ), Preah Khan Reach Svay Rieng 7-1 Western Phnom Penh (6 September )
- Longest winning run: Boeung Ket Angkor (8 games)
- Longest unbeaten run: Boeung Ket Angkor (13 games)
- Longest losing run: Asia Euro United, CMAC United (7 games each)
- Highest attendance: 4,500 Phnom Penh Crown 0-1 Boeung Ket Angkor (30 April )

2016 Cambodian League or 2016 Metfone Cambodian League is the 32nd season of the Cambodian League. Contested by 10 clubs, it operates on a system of promotion and relegation with Cambodian Second League. Western Phnom Penh decided to merge with Cambodian Tiger, but later both team couldn't reach an agreement. The league starts from 19 February until 14 August. Phnom Penh Crown are the defending champions.

== Teams ==
- Asia Euro United
- Boeung Ket Angkor
- Cambodian Tiger
- CMAC United (withdrew) but later decided to participate again after had sponsorship from Japanese company.
- Nagaworld
- National Defense Ministry
- National Police Commissary
- Phnom Penh Crown
- Preah Khan Reach Svay Rieng
- Western Phnom Penh
- Build Bright United (withdrew)
- Kirivong Sok Sen Chey (withdrew)

== Personnel and sponsoring ==
Team	Sponsor	Kit maker	Team captain	Head coach
Asia Euro United	Asia Euro University	NT Sport	(Cambodia) Kha Theara	(Nigeria) Jack Tonye Charles
Boeung Ket Angkor	Angkor Beer	FBT	(Cambodia) Khoun Laboravy	(Cambodia) Prak Sovannara
Cambodian Tiger	FORWARD Group	NT Sport	(Japan) Masakazu Kihara	(Cambodia) Hok Sochivorn
CMAC United			(Cambodia) Kamrutin Suhaimi	(Cambodia) Keo Narin
Nagaworld	Naga World	FBT	(Japan) Masahiro Fukasawa	(Cambodia) Meas Channa
National Defense Ministry		Zealver	(Cambodia) Phuong Soksana	(Cambodia) Tep Long Rachana
National Police Commissary			(Cambodia) Say Piseth	(Cambodia) Peas Sothy
Phnom Penh Crown	Smart Axiata	FBT	(Cambodia) Boris Kok	(Cambodia) Sam Samnang
Preah Khan Reach Svay Rieng		FBT	(Cambodia) Prak Mony Udom	(Cambodia) Som Vandeth
Western Phnom Penh	ONLINE ISP cambodia	NT Sport	(Cambodia) Kroch Mol	(Cambodia) Ouk Chamrong

== Stadiums and locations ==
Locations of teams in the 2016 Cambodian League

Team	Location	Stadium	Capacity
Asia Euro United	Phnom Penh	Olympic Stadium	50,000
Boeung Ket Angkor	Kampong Cham	Olympic Stadium	50,000
Cambodian Tiger	Phnom Penh	Olympic Stadium	50,000
CMAC United	Kampong Chhnang	Kampong Chhnang Stadium	50,000
Nagaworld	Phnom Penh	Olympic Stadium	50,000
National Defense Ministry	Phnom Penh	RCAF Old Stadium	10,000
National Police Commissary	Phnom Penh	Olympic Stadium	50,000
Phnom Penh Crown	Phnom Penh	RSN Stadium	5,000
Preah Khan Reach Svay Rieng	Svay Rieng	Svay Rieng Stadium	1,500
Western Phnom Penh	Phnom Penh	Western Stadium	1,000

== Foreign players ==
The number of foreign players is restricted to five per team. A team can use four foreign players on the field in each game, including at least one player from the AFC country.

Club	Player 1	Player 2	Player 3	Player 4	Asian Player
Asia Euro United	(Nigeria) Kenneth Nwafor	(Nigeria) Momoh Degule	(Nigeria) David Njoku		(Japan) Marin Takano
Boeung Ket Angkor	(Nigeria) Esoh Paul Omogba	(Japan) Wada Yuya	(Nigeria) Samuel Ajayi	(Nigeria) Dzarma Bata	(Japan) Tatsuta Kazuki
Cambodian Tiger	(Japan) Masakazu Kihara	(Japan) Masato Yoshihara	(Japan) Tomohiro Masaki	(Japan) Tomoyuki Sadakuni	(Japan) Tomoki Muramatsu
CMAC United	(Nigeria) Okereke Timothy	(Nigeria) Adebayo Ademola	(South Africa) Matthew Rhoda	(France) Francois Guihard	(Japan) Kazu Yanagidate
Nagaworld	(Nigeria) Rasheed Omokafe	(Cameroon) Befolo Mbarga	(Ivory Coast) Anderson Zogbe	(Nigeria) George Kelechi	(Japan) Masahiro Fukasawa
National Defense	(Japan) Taku Yanagidate	(North Korea) Choe Myong-ho	(North Korea) Kim Kyong-hun	(North Korea) Ri Hyok-chol	(North Korea) Jang Song-hyok
National Police	(Ghana) Michael Osei Tutu	(Cameroon) Baldwin Ngwa	(South Africa) Shane Petersen		(South Korea) Lee Jae-jin
Phnom Penh Crown	(South Africa) Shane Booysen	(France) Anthony Aymard	(South Korea) Kim Hyun-woo	(Nigeria) George Bisan	(South Korea) Jang In-yong
Preah Khan Reach	(Rwanda) Atuheire Kipson	(Uganda) Mohammed Latif	(South Korea) Lee Jong ho	(Nigeria) Obi Ugochukwu	(Japan) Hikaru Mizuno
Western Phnom Penh	(Nigeria) Matthew Osa	(Nigeria) Peter Anayo	(Japan) Takahito Ota		(Japan) Akira Higashiyama

== League table ==
Pos	Team	Pld	W	D	L	GF	GA	GD	Pts	Qualification
1	Boeung Ket Angkor	18	15	2	1	56	15	+41	47	Qualification to Mekong Club Championship & AFC Cup play-off round
2	National Defense Ministry	18	15	1	2	45	15	+30	46	
3	Nagaworld	18	10	5	3	31	17	+14	35	AFC Cup qualifying round
4	Preah Khan Reach Svay Rieng	18	10	1	7	48	31	+17	31	
5	Phnom Penh Crown	18	8	4	6	32	20	+12	28	AFC Cup play-off round
6	Cambodian Tiger	18	7	4	7	36	35	+1	25	
7	National Police Commissary	18	4	5	9	20	32	−12	17	
8	Western Phnom Penh	18	2	5	11	30	61	−31	11	
9	CMAC United	18	2	2	14	23	60	−37	8	
10	Asia Euro United	18	1	3	14	15	51	−36	6	

=== Result table ===
Home \ Away	AEU	BKA	TIG	CMA	NAG	NDM	NPC	PPC	PKR	WPP
Asia Euro United		0–5	1–3	1–5	0–1	1–4	0–1	0–4	1–3	3–3
Boeung Ket Angkor	3–2		5–1	4–0	0–0	1–2	2–1	3–2	3–1	6–0
Cambodian Tiger	4–1	1–2		2–1	1–1	1–2	2–1	0–0	3–4	6–0
CMAC United	1–1	0–7	1–3		1–3	0–2	2–2	0–4	3–5	4–2
Nagaworld	5–1	1–2	2–2	4–1		0–1	2–1	2–1	2–1	1–1
National Defense Ministry	2–1	2–2	1–0	3–0	0–1		2–0	1–2	2–1	6–2
National Police Commissary	0–0	1–7	1–2	1–0	1–2	1–4		0–0	1–0	2–2
Phnom Penh Crown	0–2	0–1	3–1	4–2	1–1	0–1	3–0		1–0	3–1
Preah Khan Reach Svay Rieng	4–0	0–1	6–1	6–2	2–1	1–5	1–1	3–2		7–1
Western Phnom Penh	3–1	1–2	3–3	6–0	0–2	1–5	1–5	2–2	1–3	

Updated to match(es) played on 21 August 2016. Source: cambodialeague.com
Legend: Blue = home team win; Yellow = draw; Red = away team win.

== Matches ==
Fixtures and Results of the cambodia metfone league 2016 season.

=== Week 1 ===
19 February 2016	Phnom Penh Crown (Cambodia)	3 - 1	Cambodia Tiger	RSN Stadium, Phnom Penh
18:00 UTC+06:30	(South Africa) Shane Booysen 17', 59', 83'		(Japan) Masakazu Kihara 72'

20 February 2016	Police Commissary (Cambodia)	1 - 4	(Cambodia) National Defense	Olympic Stadium, Phnom Penh
15:30 UTC+06:30	(Ghana) Michael Osei Tutu 70'		(Cambodia) Phuong Soksana 12', 42' (Cambodia) ke vannak 59' (North Korea) Choe Myong-ho 64'

20 February 2016	Naga World (Cambodia)	1 - 1	(Cambodia) Western Phnom Penh	Olympic Stadium, Phnom Penh
18:00 UTC+06:30	(Cameroon) privat 17'		(Cambodia) sem bunny 8'

21 February 2016	Boeung Ket (Cambodia)	3 - 2	(Cambodia) Asia Europe University	Olympic Stadium, Phnom Penh
18:00 UTC+06:30	(Cambodia) Chan Vathanaka 65', 90+3' (Nigeria) Samuel Ajayi 63'		(Nigeria) moneke obi 85' (Cambodia) chhang hai 90+3'

21 February 2016	Svay Rieng (Cambodia)	6 - 2	(Cambodia) United CMAC	Svay Rieng Stadium, Svay Rieng
18:00 UTC+06:30	(Rwanda) Atuheire Kipson 14', 67' (Cambodia) Sok Samnang 43', 59' (Uganda) latif 53' (Cambodia) Soeuy Visal 27'		(Cambodia) okereke 21' (France) laurent 53'

=== Week 2 ===
26 February 2016	Police Commissary (Cambodia)	0 - 0	(Cambodia) Phnom Penh Crown	Olympic Stadium, Phnom Penh
18:00 UTC+06:30

27 February 2016	Naga World (Cambodia)	0 - 1	(Cambodia) National Defense	Olympic Stadium, Phnom Penh
15:30 UTC+06:30			(North Korea) Choe Myong-ho 64'

27 February 2016	Boeung Ket (Cambodia)	6 - 0	(Cambodia) Western Phnom Penh	Olympic Stadium, Phnom Penh
18:00 UTC+06:30	(Nigeria) Samuel Ajayi 11', 83' (Cambodia) Sok Sovan 22' (Cambodia) Khoun Laboravy 23' (Japan) Wada Yuya 33' (Cambodia) Chan Vathanaka 62'

28 February 2016	Asia Europe University (Cambodia)	1 - 5	(Cambodia) United CMAC	Olympic Stadium, Phnom Penh
18:00 UTC+06:30	(Nigeria) moneke 35'		(Nigeria) okereke timothy 10', 28', 48' (South Africa) matthew keneth 53' (Cambodia) hong makara 64'

28 February 2016	Svay Rieng (Cambodia)	6 - 1	Cambodia Tiger	Svay Rieng Stadium, Svay Rieng
18:00 UTC+06:30	(South Korea) Lee Jong ho 25', 30', 53' (Rwanda) Atuheire Kipson 22', 83' (Cambodia) Sok Samnang 71'		(Japan) Tomoki Muramatsu 80'

=== Week 3 ===
4 March 2016	United CMAC (Cambodia)	0 - 7	(Cambodia) Boeung Ket	Olympic Stadium, Phnom Penh
18:00 UTC+06:30			(Cambodia) Chan Vathanaka 26', 46', 53' (Nigeria) Paul Omogba 18', 74' (Japan) Tatsuta Kazuki 60' (Cambodia) Hong Pheng 90+3'

5 March 2016	Asia Europe University (Cambodia)	1 - 3	Cambodia Tiger	Olympic Stadium, Phnom Penh
15:30 UTC+06:30	(Cambodia) Chan Dara 3' (pen.)		(Japan) Tomoki Muramatsu (pen(45)) (Japan) Masakazu Kihara (pen(74)), 79'

5 March 2016	Naga World (Cambodia)	2 - 1	(Cambodia) Phnom Penh Crown	Olympic Stadium, Phnom Penh
18:00 UTC+06:30	(Cambodia) Kouch Sokumpheak 1' (Cameroon) privat 65'		(Cambodia) sean pissa 80'

6 March 2016	Western Phnom Penh (Cambodia)	1 - 5	(Cambodia) National Defense	Western Stadium, Phnom Penh
15:30 UTC+06:30	(Nigeria) matthew osa 66'		(North Korea) Choe Myong-ho 18', 55', 71', 72' (Cambodia) Reung Bunheing 44'

6 March 2016	Svay Rieng (Cambodia)	1 - 1	(Cambodia) Police Commissary	Svay Rieng Stadium, Svay Rieng
6:00 UTC+06:30	(Cambodia) sareth krya 32'		(Ghana) michael osei tutu 34'

=== Week 4 ===
1 April 2016	Svay Rieng (Cambodia)	2 - 1	(Cambodia) Nagaworld	Svay Rieng Stadium, Svay Rieng
6:00 UTC+06:30	(Rwanda) Atuheire Kipson 20', 88'		(Cambodia) Nen Sothearoth 57' (o.g.)

2 April 2016	United CMAC (Cambodia)	1 - 3	Cambodia Tiger	Olympic Stadium, Phnom Penh
15:30 UTC+06:30	(Cambodia) un chi 48'		(Japan) Tomoki Muramatsu 55' (pen(69)) (Cambodia) Taing Sopheak 65'

2 April 2016	Boeung Ket (Cambodia)	1 - 2	(Cambodia) National Defense	Olympic Stadium, Phnom Penh
18:00 UTC+06:30	(Nigeria) Samuel Ajayi 81'		(North Korea) kyong hun 51' (North Korea) Choe Myong-ho 80'

3 April 2016	Western Phnom Penh (Cambodia)	2 - 2	(Cambodia) Phnom Penh Crown	Western Stadium, Phnom Penh
15:30 UTC+06:30	(Cambodia) sem bunny 37' (Nigeria) matthew osa 77'		(Nigeria) George Kelechi 60' (Cambodia) Keo Sokngon 89'

3 April 2016	Police Commissary (Cambodia)	0 - 0	(Cambodia) Asia Europe University	Olympic Stadium, Phnom Penh
18:00 UTC+06:30

=== Week 5 ===
8 April 2016	Asia Europe University (Cambodia)	0-1	(Cambodia) Naga World	Olympic Stadium, Phnom Penh
18:00 UTC+06:30			(Cambodia) Tum Saray 84'

9 April 2016	National Defense (Cambodia)	1-2	(Cambodia) Phnom Penh Crown	RCAF Old Stadium, Phnom Penh
15:30 UTC+06:30	(North Korea) Choe Myong-ho 79'		(Cambodia) Leng Makara 34' (Nigeria) George Kelechi 42'

10 April 2016	Western Phnom Penh (Cambodia)	1-3	(Cambodia) Svay Rieng	Western Stadium, Phnom Penh
15:30 UTC+06:30	(Nigeria) Matthew Osa (pen62)		(Cambodia) Sok Samnang 22', 82' (Cambodia) Sam Oeun Pidor 23'

10 April 2016	United CMAC (Cambodia)	2-2	(Cambodia) Police Commissary	Olympic Stadium, Phnom Penh
15:30 UTC+06:30	(Nigeria) Okereke Timothy 31' (Cambodia) Hong Makara 85'		(Ghana) Michael Osei Tutu 66' (Cambodia) Noun Borey 90+4'

10 April 2016	Cambodia Tiger	1-2	(Cambodia) Boeung Ket	Olympic Stadium, Phnom Penh
18:00 UTC+06:30	(Japan) Masato Yoshihara 59'		(Cambodia) Khoun Laboravy 74' (Cambodia) Chan Vathanaka 82'

=== Week 6 ===
29 April 2016	Svay Rieng (Cambodia)	1-5	(Cambodia) National Defense	Svay Rieng Stadium, Svay Rieng
18:00 UTC+06:30	(Cambodia) Sam Oeun Pidor 15'		(North Korea) Choe Myong-ho 26' (Cambodia) Phuong Soksana 46' (Cambodia) Nub Tola 55' (o.g.) (North Korea) kyong hun 69', 90'

30 April 2016	United CMAC (Cambodia)	1-3	(Cambodia) Naga World	Olympic Stadium, Phnom Penh
18:00 UTC+06:30	(Nigeria) okereke (Pen84)		(Cameroon) privat 13' (South Korea) Park Yong-joon 40' (Cambodia) Sos Suhana 60'

30 April 2016	Phnom Penh Crown (Cambodia)	0-1	(Cambodia) Boeung Ket	RSN Stadium, Phnom Penh
18:00 UTC+06:30			(Cambodia) Sok Sovan 72'; (red card) 76'

1 May 2016	Asia Europe University (Cambodia)	3-3	(Cambodia) Western Phnom Penh	Olympic Stadium, Phnom Penh
15:30 UTC+06:30	(Cambodia) sengdara 13', 72' (Cambodia) porot 53'		(Cambodia) rany 1' (Nigeria) osa 41', 48'

1 May 2016	Police Commissary (Cambodia)	1-2	Cambodia Tiger	Olympic Stadium, Phnom Penh
18:00 UTC+06:30	(Cambodia) Nuth Sinoun (Pen40)		(Japan) Masato Yoshihara 1' (Cambodia) rothserey 90+1'

=== Week 7 ===
6 May 2016	Phnom Penh Crown (Cambodia)	1-0	(Cambodia) Svay Rieng	RSN Stadium, Phnom Penh
18:00 UTC+06:30	(Nigeria) George Kelechi 85'

7 May 2016	National Defense (Cambodia)	2-1	(Cambodia) Asia Europe University	RCAF Old Stadium, Phnom Penh
15:30 UTC+06:30	(North Korea) Kim Kyong-hon 18' (North Korea) Choe Myong-ho 63'		(Cambodia) Soeung Sopanha (pen75)

7 May 2016	United CMAC (Cambodia)	4-2	(Cambodia) Western Phnom Penh	Olympic Stadium, Phnom Penh
18:00 UTC+06:30	(South Africa) matthew keneth 38', 60', 79' (Cambodia) Prum Puthsethy 47' (o.g.)		(Cambodia) Sem Bunny 49' (Nigeria) Matthew Osa 68'

8 May 2016	Police Commissary (Cambodia)	1-7	(Cambodia) Boeung Ket	Olympic Stadium, Phnom Penh
15:30 UTC+06:30	(Cambodia) Tith Dina (pen8)		(Cambodia) Khoun Laboravy (pen18), 33', 34', 53' (Nigeria) Dzama Bata 42' (Cambodia) Chan Vathanaka 80', 88'

8 May 2016	Cambodia Tiger	1-1	(Cambodia) Naga World	Olympic Stadium, Phnom Penh
18:00 UTC+06:30	(Cambodia) Suong Virak 89'		(South Korea) Park Yong-joon (pen65)

=== Week 8 ===
21 May 2016	Cambodia Tiger	6-0	(Cambodia) Western Phnom Penh	Olympic Stadium, Phnom Penh
15:30 UTC+06:30	(Japan) Masato Yoshihara 14', 72' (Japan) Tomoki Muramatsu (pen40), 56', 90' (Cambodia) Suong Virak 46'

21 May 2016	Boeung Ket (Cambodia)	3-1	(Cambodia) Svay Rieng	Olympic Stadium, Phnom Penh
18:00 UTC+06:30	(Cambodia) Chan Vathanaka 85', 89', 90+3'		(Rwanda) Atuheire Kipson 51'

22 May 2016	National Defense (Cambodia)	3-0	(Cambodia) United CMAC	RCAF Old Stadium, Phnom Penh
15:30 UTC+06:30	(North Korea) Choe Myong-ho (pen29), 85' (Cambodia) Phuong Soksana 58'

22 May 2016	Police Commissary (Cambodia)	1-2	(Cambodia) Naga World	Olympic Stadium, Phnom Penh
18:00 UTC+06:30	(Cambodia) Nuth Sinoun 85'		(Cambodia) Sos Suhana 34' (Cambodia) Tum Saray 49'

22 May 2016	Phnom Penh Crown (Cambodia)	0-2	(Cambodia) Asia Europe University	RSN Stadium, Phnom Penh
18:00 UTC+06:30			(Cameroon) baldwin (pen.21), 48'

=== Week 9 ===
11 June 2016	Police Commissary (Cambodia)	2-2	(Cambodia) Western Phnom Penh	Olympic Stadium, Phnom Penh
18:00 UTC+06:30	(South Korea) lee jae-jien 35' (Cambodia) Tith Dina 81'		(Cambodia) nay A sary 20', 67'

12 June 2016	Naga World (Cambodia)	1-2	(Cambodia) Boeung Ket	Olympic Stadium, Phnom Penh
15:30 UTC+06:30	(Ivory Coast) Anderson 74'		(Cambodia) Khoun Laboravy 52' (Cambodia) Chan Vathanaka 58'

12 June 2016	Phnom Penh Crown (Cambodia)	4-2	(Cambodia) United CMAC	RSN Stadium, Phnom Penh
18:00 UTC+06:30	(Cambodia) Leng Makara 1', 62' (Cambodia) Keo Sokngon 35' (Cambodia) Boris Kok (pen87)		(Nigeria) okereke 28', 68'

12 June 2016	Svay Rieng (Cambodia)	4-0	(Cambodia) Asia Europe University	Svay Rieng Stadium, Svay Rieng
18:00 UTC+06:30	(Rwanda) Atuheire Kipson 50', 67' (Cambodia) Hoy Phallin 55' (South Korea) Lee Jong ho 74'

12 June 2016	Cambodia Tiger	1-2	(Cambodia) National Defense	Olympic Stadium, Phnom Penh
18:00 UTC+06:30	(Japan) Tomoki Muramatsu 6'		(North Korea) Choe Myong-ho 39' (pen49)

=== Week 10 ===
17 June 2016	Cambodia Tiger	0-0	(Cambodia) Phnom Penh Crown	Olympic Stadium, Phnom Penh
18:00 UTC+06:30

18 June 2016	National Defense (Cambodia)	2-0	(Cambodia) Police Commissary	RCAF Old Stadium, Phnom Penh
15:30 UTC+06:30	(North Korea) Ri Hyok-chol 37', 45'

18 June 2016	Western Phnom Penh (Cambodia)	0-2	(Cambodia) Naga World	Western Stadium, Phnom Penh
18:00 UTC+06:30			(Nigeria) Rasheed Omokafe 16', 40'

19 June 2016	Asia Europe University (Cambodia)	0-5	(Cambodia) Boeung Ket	Olympic Stadium, Phnom Penh
18:00 UTC+06:30			(Nigeria) Omoba 50', 84' (Cambodia) Chan Vathanaka 64', 73' (Cambodia) Rous Samoeun 82'

19 June 2016	United CMAC (Cambodia)	3-5	(Cambodia) Svay Rieng	Olympic Stadium
15:30 UTC+06:30 (Cambodia)	(Cambodia) Soeuy Visal 3' (o.g.) (Cambodia) hong meakara 58' (Cambodia) Va Buthor 78'		(Cambodia) Prak Mony Udom (pen24), 31' (Cambodia) sles sen 49' (o.g.) (Cambodia) Nen Sothearoth 65' (Cambodia) Sok Samnang 73'

=== Week 11 ===
24 June 2016	Phnom Penh Crown (Cambodia)	3-0	(Cambodia) Police Commissary	RSN Stadium, Phnom Penh
18:00 UTC+06:30	(Cambodia) Thierry Bin 49' (France) Anthony Aymard 74' (Cambodia) Keo Sokngon 80'

25 June 2016	National Defense (Cambodia)	0-1	(Cambodia) Naga World	RCAF Old Stadium, Phnom Penh
15:30 UTC+06:30			(Nigeria) Anderson 90+2'

25 June 2016	Western Phnom Penh (Cambodia)	1-2	(Cambodia) Boeung Ket	Western Stadium, Phnom Penh
18:00 UTC+06:30	(Cambodia) Run Rany 7'		(Cambodia) Khoun Laboravy 64' (pen66)

26 June 2016	United CMAC (Cambodia)	1-1	(Cambodia) Asia Europe University	Olympic Stadium, Phnom Penh
18:00 UTC+06:30	(Cambodia) Makara 62'		(Japan) Marin 3'

26 June 2016	Cambodia Tiger	3-4	(Cambodia) Svay Rieng	Olympic Stadium, Phnom Penh
18:00 UTC+06:30	(Japan) Masakazu Kihara 18' (Japan) Tomoki Muramatsu 45+1' (pen86)		(Cambodia) Sam Oeun Pidor 9' (Cambodia) Prak Mony Udom 24' (pen70) (Cambodia) Sok Samnang 54'

=== Week 12 ===
8 July 2016	Cambodia Tiger	4-1	(Cambodia) Asia Europe University	Western Stadium, Phnom Penh
15:30 UTC+06:30	(Japan) Masato Yoshihara 20' (Japan) Tomoki Muramatsu 30', 74' (Cambodia) Taing Sopheak 70'	Report	(Japan) Tomoyuki Sadakuni 79' (o.g.)

8 July 2016	Phnom Penh Crown (Cambodia)	1-1	(Cambodia) Naga World	RSN Stadium, Phnom Penh
18:00 UTC+06:30	(South Korea) Kim Hyun-woo 30'	Report	(Cambodia) Sun Sovannarith (pen90)

9 July 2016	Police Commissary (Cambodia)	1-0	(Cambodia) Svay Rieng	Western Stadium, Phnom Penh
15:30 UTC+06:30	(Ghana) Michael Osei Tutu 17'	Report

10 July 2016	Boeung Ket (Cambodia)	4-0	(Cambodia) United CMAC	Bati Stadium, Phnom Penh
15:30 UTC+06:30	(Nigeria) Dzama bata 19' (Cambodia) Chan Vathanaka 71', 78', 86'	Report

24 July 2016	Western Phnom Penh (Cambodia)	2-6	(Cambodia) National Defense	RCAF Old Stadium, Phnom Penh
15:30 UTC+06:30	(Nigeria) Matthew Osa 60', 64'	Report	(North Korea) Ri Hyok-chol 16', 20' (Cambodia) Ke Vannak 44', 53' (Cambodia) Reung Bunheing 57' (North Korea) Choe Myong-ho 90+4'

=== Week 13 ===
15 July 2016	Asia Europe University (Cambodia)	0-1	(Cambodia) Police Commissary	RSN Stadium, Phnom Penh
15:30 UTC+06:30		Report	(Nigeria) Kenneth Nwafor 24' (o.g.)

16 July 2016	Cambodia Tiger	2-1	(Cambodia) United CMAC	Western Stadium, Phnom Penh
15:30 UTC+06:30	(Japan) Tomoki Muramatsu 29', 79'	Report	(Cambodia) Va Bottroi 45'

16 July 2016	National Defense (Cambodia)	2-2	(Cambodia) Boeung Ket	RSN Stadium, Phnom Penh
18:00 UTC+06:30	(Cambodia) Chhin Chhoeun 34' (North Korea) Choe Myong-ho 51'	Report	(Nigeria) Dzama Bata 30' (Cambodia) Sok Sovan 51'

17 July 2016	Nagaworld (Cambodia)	2-1	(Cambodia) Svay Rieng	Olympic Stadium, Phnom Penh
15:30 UTC+06:30	(Cambodia) Sun Sovannarith 51', 90+1'	Report	(Cambodia) Nen Sothearoth 80'

17 August 2016	Phnom Penh Crown (Cambodia)	3 - 1	(Cambodia) Western Phnom Penh	RSN Stadium, Phnom Penh
18:00 UTC+06:30	(Cambodia) Keo Sokpheng 15' (South Korea) Kim Hyun-woo 61', 68'	Report	(Cambodia) Run Rany 48'

=== Week 14 ===
31 July 2016	Police Commissary (Cambodia)	1-0	(Cambodia) United CMAC	Olympic Stadium, Phnom Penh
15:30 UTC+06:30	(Cambodia) Tith Dina 85'	Report

31 July 2016	Boeung Ket (Cambodia)	5-1	Cambodia Tiger	Olympic Stadium, Phnom Penh
18:00 UTC+06:30	(Japan) Tatsuta Kazuki 9' (Nigeria) Dzarma Bata 20' (Nigeria) Samuel Ajayi 79', 82' (Cambodia) Chan Vathanaka 90+4'	Report	(Japan) Masato Yoshihara 67'

1 August 2016	Naga World (Cambodia)	5-1	(Cambodia) Asia Europe University	Olympic Stadium, Phnom Penh
18:00 UTC+06:30	(Cambodia) Nhim Sovannara 16' (Nigeria) Geogh Kalechi Standly 37', 90' (Nigeria) Rasheed Omokafe 65' (Cambodia) Sary Matnorotin 81'	Report	(Nigeria) David Njoku 51' (pen.)

1 August 2016	Phnom Penh Crown (Cambodia)	0-1	(Cambodia) National Defense	RSN Stadium, Phnom Penh
18:00 UTC+06:30		Report	(North Korea) Kim Kyong-hon 62'

6 September 2016	Svay Rieng (Cambodia)	7 - 1	(Cambodia) Western Phnom Penh	Svay Rieng Stadium, Svay Rieng
18:00 UTC+06:30	(Rwanda) Atuheire Kipson 7', 70' (Cambodia) Prak Mony Udom 23' (Nigeria) Moneka Obi Ugochukwu 32', 42', 78' (Uganda) Mohammed Mugisha Latif 45'	Report	(Japan) Akira Higashiyama 57'

=== Week 15 ===
5 August 2016	Asia Europe University (Cambodia)	1 - 3	(Cambodia) Svay Rieng	Olympic Stadium, Phnom Penh
18:00 UTC+06:30	(Cambodia) Soeung Sopanha 90'	Report	(Cambodia) Sam Oeun Pidor 7' (Rwanda) Atuheire Kipson 46' (Cambodia) Nub Tola 78'

6 August 2016	Western Phnom Penh (Cambodia)	1 - 5	(Cambodia) Police Commissary	Western Stadium, Phnom Penh
15:30 UTC+06:30	(Cambodia) Run Rany 6'	Report	(Ghana) Michael Osei Tutu 9', 61', 75' (Cambodia) Tith Dina 73', 86'

6 August 2016	United CMAC (Cambodia)	0 - 4	(Cambodia) Phnom Penh Crown	Olympic Stadium, Phnom Penh
18:00 UTC+06:30		Report	(Nigeria) George Bisan 16', 90' (France) Anthony Aymard 35' (South Korea) Kim Hyun-woo 90+3'

7 August 2016	National Defense Ministry (Cambodia)	1 - 0	Cambodia Tiger	RCAF Old Stadium, Phnom Penh
15:30 UTC+06:30	(North Korea) Ri Hyok-chol 47'	Report

7 August 2016	Boeung Ket (Cambodia)	0 - 0	(Cambodia) Naga World	Olympic Stadium, Phnom Penh
18:00 UTC+06:30		Report

=== Week 16 ===
13 August 2016	National Defense (Cambodia)	2 - 1	(Cambodia) Svay Rieng	RCAF Old Stadium, Phnom Penh
15:30 UTC+06:30	(Cambodia) Ke Vannak 12' (Cambodia) Sor Piseth 82'	Report	(Nigeria) Moneka Obi Ugochukwu 28'

13 August 2016	Naga World (Cambodia)	4 - 1	(Cambodia) United CMAC	Olympic Stadium, Phnom Penh
15:30 UTC+06:30	(Cambodia) Sary Matnorotin 6' (Cambodia) Khim Borey 54' (Nigeria) Rasheed Omokafe 79' (Nigeria) Geogh Kalechi Standly 80'	Report	(Nigeria) Okereke Timothy 91'

13 August 2016	Cambodia Tiger	2 - 1	(Cambodia) Police Commissary	Olympic Stadium, Phnom Penh
18:00 UTC+06:30	(Japan) Tomohiro Masaki 50' (Cambodia) Mao Bunchantha 58'	Report	(Cambodia) Ol Ravy 80'

14 August 2016	Western Phnom Penh (Cambodia)	3 - 1	(Cambodia) Asia Europe University	Western Stadium, Phnom Penh
15:30 UTC+06:30	(Cambodia) Run Rany 13', 34' (Cambodia) Long Phearath 81'	Report	(Cambodia) Chim Sambo 90+2'

14 August 2016	Boeung Ket (Cambodia)	3 - 2	(Cambodia) Phnom Penh Crown	Olympic Stadium, Phnom Penh
18:00 UTC+06:30	(Cambodia) Chan Vathanaka 28', 45', 53'	Report	(South Korea) Jang In-yong 5' (Cambodia) Keo Sokpheng 82'

=== Week 17 ===
17 August 2016	Naga World (Cambodia)	2 - 1	(Cambodia) Police Commissary	Olympic Stadium, Phnom Penh
18:00 UTC+06:30	(Cambodia) Sun Sovannarith 39' (Nigeria) Geogh Kalechi Standly 82'	Report	(Ghana) Michael Osei Tutu 50'

19 August 2016	Svay Rieng (Cambodia)	0 - 1	(Cambodia) Boeung Ket	Svay Rieng Stadium, Svay Rieng
18:00 UTC+06:30		Report	(Nigeria) Samuel Ajayi 55'

20 August 2016	Western Phnom Penh (Cambodia)	3 - 3	Cambodia Tiger	Western Stadium, Phnom Penh
15:30 UTC+06:30	(Japan) Akira Higashiyama 21', 25' (pen.) (Cambodia) Run Rany 28'	Report	(Japan) Masato Yoshihara 7', 38' (Japan) Tomohiro Masaki 81'

20 August 2016	Asia Euro United (Cambodia)	0 - 4	(Cambodia) Phnom Penh Crown	Olympic Stadium, Phnom Penh
18:00 UTC+06:30		Report	(Cambodia) Thierry Bin 4' (France) Anthony Aymard 22' (Cambodia) Ouk Sothy 60' (Cambodia) Keo Sokpheng 62'

21 August 2016	CMAC United (Cambodia)	0 - 2	(Cambodia) National Defense Ministry	Olympic Stadium, Phnom Penh
18:00 UTC+06:30		Report	(North Korea) Choe Myong-ho 51' (pen.) (Cambodia) Ke Vannak 82'

=== Week 18 ===
24 August 2016	Svay Rieng (Cambodia)	3 - 2	(Cambodia) Phnom Penh Crown	Svay Rieng Stadium, Svay Rieng
18:00 UTC+06:30	(Cambodia) Hoy Phallin 10' (Cambodia) Prak Mony Udom 29', 72'	Report	(Cambodia) Keo Sokpheng 67' (Cambodia) Boris Kok 90+4'

9 September 2016	Asia Europe University (Cambodia)	1 - 4	(Cambodia) National Defense	Olympic Stadium, Phnom Penh
18:00 UTC+06:30	(Cambodia) Chim Sambo 31'	Report	(North Korea) Ri Hyok-chol 45', 64' (North Korea) Choe Myong-ho 70', 84'

10 September 2016	Western Phnom Penh (Cambodia)	6 - 0	(Cambodia) United CMAC	Western Stadium, Phnom Penh
15:30 UTC+06:30	(Japan) Takahito Ota 15', 29' (Japan) Akira Higashiyama 27' (Cambodia) Run Rany 32' (Nigeria) Matthew Osa 45' ? 70' (o.g.)	Report

10 September 2016	Naga World (Cambodia)	2 - 2	Cambodia Tiger	Olympic Stadium, Phnom Penh
15:30 UTC+06:30	(Cameroon) Befolo Mbarga 26' (Nigeria) Rasheed Omokafe 30'	Report	(Japan) Tomoki Muramatsu 15', 22'

10 September 2016	Boeung Ket (Cambodia)	2 - 1	(Cambodia) Police Commissary	Olympic Stadium, Phnom Penh
18:00 UTC+06:30	(Nigeria) Dzama Bata 53' (Cambodia) Sok Sovan 71'	Report	(South Africa) Shane Petersen 86'

== Top scorers ==
Rank	Player	Club	Goals
1	(Cambodia) Chan Vathanaka	Boeung Ket Angkor	22
2	(North Korea) Choe Myong-ho	National Defense Ministry	19
3	(Japan) Tomoki Muramatsu	Cambodian Tiger	15
4	(Rwanda) Atuheire Kipson	Preah Khan Reach Svay Rieng	12
5	(Cambodia) Khoun Laboravy	Boeung Ket Angkor	9
5	(Nigeria) Okereke Timothy	CMAC United	9
5	(Nigeria) Matthew Osa	Western Phnom Penh	9
8	(Ghana) Michael Osei Tutu	National Police Commissary	8
8	(Japan) Masato Yoshihara	Cambodian Tiger	8
8	(Cambodia) Run Rany	Western Phnom Penh	8
11	(Cambodia) Sok Samnang	Preah Khan Reach Svay Rieng	7
11	(Nigeria) George Kelechi	Phnom Penh Crown/Nagaworld	7
11	(Nigeria) Samuel Ajayi	Boeung Ket Angkor	7
11	(Cambodia) Prak Mony Udom	Preah Khan Reach Svay Rieng	7
11	(North Korea) Ri Hyok-chol	National Defense Ministry	7
16	(North Korea) Kim Kyong-hun	National Defense Ministry	6
16	(Nigeria) Obi Ugochukwu	Asia Euro United/P.K.R. Svay Rieng	6
18	(Cambodia) Tith Dina	National Police Commissary	5
18	(Cambodia) Ke Vannak	National Defense Ministry	5
18	(Nigeria) Rasheed Omokafe	Nagaworld	5
18	(Nigeria) Dzarma Bata	Boeung Ket Angkor	5

=== Hat-tricks ===
Player	For	Against	Result	Date
(South Africa) Shane Booysen	Phnom Penh Crown	Cambodian Tiger	3–1	19 February
(Nigeria) Okereke Timothy	CMAC United	Asia Euro United	5–1	28 February
(South Korea) Lee Jong ho	Preah Khan Reach Svay Rieng	Cambodian Tiger	6–1	28 February
(Cambodia) Chan Vathanaka	Boeung Ket Angkor	CMAC United	7–0	4 March
(North Korea) Choe Myong-ho^{4}	National Defense Ministry	Western Phnom Penh	5-1	6 March
(South Africa) Matthew Rhoda	CMAC United	Western Phnom Penh	4–2	7 May
(Cambodia) Khoun Laboravy^{4}	Boeung Ket Angkor	National Police Commissary	7-1	8 May
(Japan) Tomoki Muramatsu	Cambodian Tiger	Western Phnom Penh	6-0	21 May
(Cambodia) Chan Vathanaka	Boeung Ket Angkor	Preah Khan Reach Svay Rieng	3-1	21 May
(Cambodia) Chan Vathanaka	Boeung Ket Angkor	CMAC United	4-0	10 July
(Ghana) Michael Osei Tutu	National Police Commissary	Western Phnom Penh	5-1	6 August
(Cambodia) Chan Vathanaka	Boeung Ket Angkor	Phnom Penh Crown	3-2	14 August
(Nigeria) Moneka Obi Ugochukwu	Preah Khan Reach Svay Rieng	Western Phnom Penh	7-1	6 September

- ^{4} players scored 4 goals

== Clean sheets ==
Rank	Player	Club	Clean sheets
1	(Cambodia) Keo Soksela	Phnom Penh Crown	6
2	(Cambodia) Prak Monyphearun	National Police Commissary	5
2	(Cambodia) Um Sereyroth	National Defense Ministry	5
4	(Cambodia) Kim Makara	Boeung Ket Angkor	4
4	(Cambodia) Sou Yaty	Boeung Ket Angkor	4
6	(Cambodia) Yok Ary	Nagaworld	3
7	(Cambodia) Pich Rovinyothin	Asia Euro United	2
7	(Cambodia) Hem Simay	Cambodian Tiger	2
9	(Cambodia) Aim Sovannarath	Preah Khan Reach Svay Rieng	1
9	(Cambodia) Samrith Seiha	Cambodian Tiger	1
9	(Cambodia) Phorn Ratana	Nagaworld	1
9	(Cambodia) Um Vichet	National Defense Ministry	1
9	(Cambodia) Neang Phanith	Western Phnom Penh	1

== Awards ==
Awards	Nation/Name	Club
The Golden Boot	(Cambodia) Chan Vathanaka	Boeung Ket Angkor
The Player of the Year	(Cambodia) Chan Vathanaka	Boeung Ket Angkor
Goalkeeper of the Year	(Cambodia) Um Sereyroth	National Defense Ministry
The Coach of the Year	(Cambodia) Tep Long Rachana	National Defense Ministry

Awards	Club
Fair Play	National Defense Ministry

== See also ==
- 2016 Cambodian Second League
- 2016 Hun Sen Cup
