= 2017 Cambodian League =

Cambodian League
- Season: 2017
- Champions: Boeung Ket FC; 3rd Cambodian League title
- Top goalscorer: Atuheire Kipson (28 goals)
- Biggest home win: Phnom Penh Crown 11–0 CMAC United (18 June)
- Biggest away win: CMAC United 0–7 Preah Khan Reach Svay Rieng (8 April)
- Highest scoring: Phnom Penh Crown 11–0 CMAC United (18 June)
- Longest winning run: Boeung Ket (8 matches)
- Longest unbeaten run: Nagaworld (13 matches)
- Longest winless run: Kirivong Sok Sen Chey (12 matches)
- Longest losing run: CMAC United (10 matches)

2017 Cambodian League or 2017 Metfone Cambodian League is the 33rd season of the Cambodian League. Contested by 12 clubs, it operates on a system of promotion and relegation with Cambodian Second League. The league starts from 18 February until 19 November. Boeung Ket Angkor are the defending champions.

== Teams ==
- Asia Euro United
- Boeung Ket
- Matsumoto Yamaga FC
- CMAC United
- Electricite du Cambodge (Promoted)
- Kirivong Sok Sen Chey (Promoted)
- Nagaworld
- National Defense Ministry
- National Police Commissary
- Phnom Penh Crown
- Preah Khan Reach Svay Rieng
- Shimizu S-Pulse

== Personnel and sponsoring ==
Team	Sponsor	Kit maker	Team captain	Head coach
Asia Euro United	Asia Euro University	NT Sport	(Cambodia) Teab Vathanak	(Cambodia) Sok Veasna
Boeung Ket	Angkor Beer	FBT	(Cambodia) Khoun Laboravy	(Australia) John Mcglynn
Cambodian Tiger	FORWARD Group	NT Sport	(Japan) Masahiro Fukasawa	(Japan) Kenichi Yatsuhashi
CMAC United		Adidas	(Cambodia) Kamaruddin Suhaimy	(Cambodia) Keo Narin
Electricite du Cambodge			(Cambodia) Choun Chum	(Cambodia) Prak Vuthy
Kirivong Sok Sen Chey			(Cambodia) Lim Samdy	(Cambodia) Phan Chan Phath
Nagaworld	Naga World	FBT	(Cambodia) Kouch Sokumpheak	(Cambodia) Meas Channa
National Defense Ministry	Ganzberg Beer		(Cambodia) Reung Bunheing	(Cambodia) Tep Long Rachana
National Police Commissary		Joma	(Cambodia) Say Piseth	(Cambodia) Nuth Sony
Phnom Penh Crown	Smart Axiata	FBT	(South Africa) Shane Booysen	(Ukraine) Oleg Starynskyi
Preah Khan Reach Svay Rieng		FBT	(Cambodia) Prak Mony Udom	(Cambodia) Som Vandeth
Western Phnom Penh	ONLINE ISP cambodia	NT Sport	(Japan) Taku Yanagidate	(Cambodia) Sum Vanna

== Stadiums and locations ==
Locations of teams in the 2016 Cambodian League

Team	Location	Stadium	Capacity
Asia Euro United	Kandal	RCAF Old Stadium	10,000
Boeung Ket	Kampong Cham	Olympic Stadium	50,000
Cambodian Tiger	Siem Reap	Svay Thom Stadium	7,000
CMAC United	Kampong Chhnang	Western Stadium	1,000
Electricite du Cambodge	Phnom Penh	Svay Rieng Stadium	1,500
Kirivong Sok Sen Chey	Takeo	Kirivong Stadium	500
Nagaworld	Kampong Speu	Olympic Stadium	50,000
National Defense Ministry	Phnom Penh	RCAF Old Stadium	10,000
National Police Commissary	Phnom Penh	RCAF Old Stadium	10,000
Phnom Penh Crown	Phnom Penh	RSN Stadium	5,000
Preah Khan Reach Svay Rieng	Svay Rieng	Svay Rieng Stadium	1,500
Western Phnom Penh	Phnom Penh	Western Stadium	1,000

== Foreign players ==
The number of foreign players is restricted to five per team. A team can use four foreign players on the field in each game, including at least one player from the AFC country.

Club	Player 1	Player 2	Player 3	Player 4	Asian Player
Asia Euro United	(Nigeria) Momoh Degule	(Japan) Kenjiro Ogino	(Nigeria) George Bisan	(Nigeria) Samuel Ajayi	(Japan) Tomohiro Masaki
Boeung Ket	(Nigeria) Esoh Omogba	(Japan) Hikaru Mizuno	(Brazil) Maycon Calijuri		(Japan) Tomoki Muramatsu
Cambodian Tiger	(Nigeria) Okereke Timothy	(Nigeria) Alade Kabiru Abdul	(Japan) Yugo Kawabata	(Nigeria) Dzarma Bata	(Japan) Masahiro Fukasawa
CMAC United	(Ghana) Michael Osei Tutu	(Australia) Shuruma Lawrence	(Nigeria) Kingsley Amamchuk		(Japan) Takahito Ota
Electricite du Cambodge					
Kirivong Sok Sen Chey	(Vietnam) Nguyen Thanh Loi				(Vietnam) Phan Truong Chinh
Nagaworld	(Ivory Coast) Anderson Zogbe	(Brazil) Diego Gama	(Nigeria) George Kelechi	(Rwanda) Atuheire Kipson	(Japan) Kento Fujihara
National Defense	(North Korea) Choe Myong-ho	(North Korea) Kim Kyong-hun	(North Korea) Ri Hyok-chol	(Brazil) Leandro Djalma	(North Korea) Jang Song-hyok
National Police	(South Korea) Jeong Hee-jong	(South Africa) Shane Petersen	(Cameroon) Baldwin Ngwa	(Japan) Kazu Yanagidate	(South Korea) No Sang-min
Phnom Penh Crown	(South Africa) Shane Booysen	(France) Anthony Aymard	(Brazil) Guto	(South Korea) Gisung Yeon	(Japan) Yuta Suzuki
Preah Khan Reach	(Nigeria) Obi Ugochukwu	(Nigeria) Chigozie Nwaokorie	(Nigeria) Chidera Ononiwu	(Nigeria) Nwankwo Chika Junior	(South Korea) Kim Nam-gun
Western Phnom Penh	(Nigeria) Matthew Osa	(Uganda) Mohammed Latif	(Nigeria) Oladipupo Abiodun	(Japan) Shimpei Wada	(Japan) Taku Yanagidate

== League table ==
Pos	Team	Pld	W	D	L	GF	GA	GD	Pts	Qualification or relegation
1	Boeung Ket (C)	22	15	3	4	56	29	+27	48	Qualification to Mekong Club Championship & Champions play-off
2	Preah Khan Reach Svay Rieng (A)	22	14	4	4	64	27	+37	46	Qualification to Champions play-off
3	Nagaworld (A)	22	13	6	3	51	19	+32	45	Qualification to Champions play-off
4	National Defense Ministry (A)	22	13	3	6	51	25	+26	42	Qualification to Champions play-off
5	Phnom Penh Crown	22	12	6	4	63	30	+33	42	
6	National Police Commissary	22	9	5	8	43	37	+6	32	
7	Cambodian Tiger	22	8	8	6	36	35	+1	32	
8	Western Phnom Penh	22	6	4	12	32	57	−25	22	
9	Electricite du Cambodge	22	6	2	14	30	61	−31	20	
10	Asia Euro United	22	5	3	14	34	55	−21	18	
11	Kirivong Sok Sen Chey (R)	22	3	3	16	26	52	−26	12	Relegation to the 2018 Cambodian Second League
12	CMAC United (R)	22	2	5	15	24	83	−59	11	Relegation to the 2018 Cambodian Second League

Updated to match(es) played on 9 December 2017. Source: FIFA RSSSF
Rules for classification: 1) points; 2) goal difference; 3) number of goals scored.
(A) Advance to a further round; (C) Champions; (R) Relegated

=== Result table ===
Home \ Away	AEU	BKFC	TIG	CMA	EDC	KSS	NAG	NDM	NPC	PPC	PKR	WPP
Asia Euro United		3–4	0–1	4–2	0–1	3–0	1–4	1–4	0–0	0–3	0–4	3–4
Boeung Ket	2–1		3–1	5–0	4–0	4–0	1–1	0–3	3–2	1–2	2–2	3–3
Cambodian Tiger	4–0	1–3		1–1	1–0	4–0	2–1	0–0	1–3	1–1	2–2	3–2
CMAC United	2–3	1–2	0–3		3–1	3–3	1–5	0–6	1–4	2–2	0–7	0–0
Electricite du Cambodge	2–2	1–4	2–3	3–5		2–0	1–4	0–5	0–0	3–6	0–3	2–1
Kirivong Sok Sen Chey	2–2	0–3	6–1	3–0	2–1		1–3	0–2	1–2	1–1	0–2	1–2
Nagaworld	4–0	1–2	0–0	3–0	3–0	3–1		1–1	2–2	0–1	2–1	4–0
National Defense Ministry	2–1	1–3	2–1	6–0	1–2	2–1	0–3		1–2	3–2	0–0	2–3
National Police Commissary	1–2	2–1	5–2	1–1	1–2	2–1	1–2	1–2		1–4	2–4	3–2
Phnom Penh Crown	4–2	4–0	2–2	11–0	5–4	6–1	1–1	0–1	2–2		0–1	1–3
Preah Khan Reach Svay Rieng	4–3	0–2	1–1	8–1	6–0	2–1	1–3	3–2	3–2	1–2		4–2
Western Phnom Penh	1–3	0–4	1–1	2–1	2–3	2–1	1–1	1–5	0–4	0–3	0–5	

Updated to match(es) played on 03 December 2017. Source: int.soccerway.com
Legend: Blue = home team win; Yellow = draw; Red = away team win.

== Champions play-off ==
=== Quarter final ===
20 December 2017
19:00 UTC+7

Nagaworld FC	0–0 (a.e.t.)	National Defense Ministry
	Report
Penalties
Dani Kouch (Cambodia) (penalty missed); Atuheire Kipson (Rwanda) (penalty scored); Kento Fujihara (Japan) (penalty scored); Kouch Sokumpheak (Cambodia) (penalty scored); Suong Virak (Cambodia) (penalty missed)	3–4	(penalty scored) (North Korea) Ri Hyok-chol; (penalty scored) (North Korea) Kim Kyong-hun; (penalty scored) (North Korea) Choe Myong-ho; (penalty scored) (Cambodia) Sok Heang

Olympic Stadium, Phnom Penh
Referee: Khuon Virak

=== Semi final ===
23 December 2017
19:00 UTC+7

Preah Khan Reach	1–3	National Defense Ministry
Mony Udom 69'	Report	Kim Kyong-hun 39', 48'; Choe Myong-ho 90+'

Svay Rieng Stadium, Svay Rieng
Referee: Choup Visal

=== Final ===
30 December 2017
19:00 UTC+7

Boeung Ket	1–1 (a.e.t.)	National Defense Ministry
Sok Sovan 14'	Report	Kim Kyong-hun 68'
Penalties
Maycon Calijuri (Brazil) (penalty scored); Khoun Laboravy (Cambodia) (penalty missed); Sath Rosib (Cambodia) (penalty scored); Khiev Vibol (Cambodia) (penalty scored); Sok Sovan (Cambodia) (penalty missed); Rous Samoeun (Cambodia) (penalty scored); Hikaru Mizuno (Japan) (penalty scored); Hong Pheng (Cambodia) (penalty scored); Esoh Omogba (Nigeria) (penalty missed); Mat Yamin (Cambodia) (penalty scored); Sou Yaty (Cambodia) (penalty scored); Maycon Calijuri (Brazil) (penalty scored); Khoun Laboravy (Cambodia) (penalty scored)	10–9	(penalty missed) (North Korea) Ri Hyok-chol; (penalty scored) (North Korea) Choe Myong-ho; (penalty missed) (North Korea) Jang Song-hyok; (penalty scored) (Cambodia) Sok Heang; (penalty scored) (Cambodia) Reung Bunheing; (penalty scored) (Cambodia) Roeurm Channroeurn; (penalty scored) (Cambodia) Phuong Soksana; (penalty scored) (Cambodia) Op Kamol; (penalty missed) (North Korea) Kim Kyong-hun; (penalty scored) (Cambodia) Thourng Da; (penalty scored) (Cambodia) Um Sereyroth; (penalty scored) (North Korea) Ri Hyok-chol; (penalty missed) (North Korea) Choe Myong-ho

Olympic Stadium, Phnom Penh
Referee: Khuon Virak

== Season Statistics ==
=== Top scorers ===
Rank	Player	Club	Goals
1	(South Africa) Shane Booysen	Phnom Penh Crown	7
2	(Rwanda) Atuheire Kipson	Nagaworld	5
3	(North Korea) Choe Myong-ho	National Defense Ministry	4
4	(Nigeria) George Bisan	Asia Euro United	3
4	(Cambodia) Chrerng Polroth	National Defense Ministry	3
4	(Ghana) Michael Osei Tutu	CMAC United	3
4	(Cambodia) Khoun Laboravy	Boeung Ket Angkor	3
8	(Cambodia) Boris Kok	Phnom Penh Crown	2
8	(Brazil) Guto	Phnom Penh Crown	2
8	(Brazil) Maycon Calijuri	Boeung Ket Angkor	2
8	(Japan) Tomoki Muramatsu	Boeung Ket Angkor	2
8	(Cambodia) Soeuy Visal	Preah Khan Reach Svay Rieng	2
8	(Nigeria) Chidera Ononiwu	Preah Khan Reach Svay Rieng	2
8	(Nigeria) Chigozie Nwaokorie	Preah Khan Reach Svay Rieng	2
8	(Cambodia) Long Phearath	Western Phnom Penh	2
8	(Nigeria) Matthew Osa	Western Phnom Penh	2
8	(Cambodia) Sun Vandeth	National Police Commissary	2

=== Hat-tricks ===
Player	For	Against	Result	Date
(Rwanda) Atuheire Kipson^{4}	Nagaworld	Electricite du Cambodge	4–1	18 February
(Nigeria) George Bisan	Asia Euro United	CMAC United	4–2	26 February
(South Africa) Shane Booysen	Phnom Penh Crown	Kirivong Sok Sen Chey	6–1	11 March

- ^{4} players scored 4 goals

=== Clean sheets ===
Rank	Player	Club	Clean sheets
1	(Cambodia) Om Oudom	Preah Khan Reach	8
2	(Cambodia) Sou Yaty	Boeung Ket	7
3	(Cambodia) Hem Simay	Cambodian Tiger	6
4	(Cambodia) Um Sereyroth	National Defense	5
5	(Cambodia) Yok Ary	Nagaworld	4
6	(Cambodia) Prak Monyphearun	Police Commissary	3
6	(Cambodia) Kung Chanvuthy	Phnom Penh Crown	3
6	(Cambodia) Kong Rafat	EDC	3
6	(Cambodia) Um Vichet	National Defense	3

== Awards ==
Awards	Nation/Name	Club
Top Scorer	(Rwanda) Atuheire Kipson	Nagaworld
Player of the season	(Cambodia) Chrerng Polroth	National Defense
Goalkeeper of the season	(Cambodia) Sou Yaty	Boeung Ket
Coach of the season	(Cambodia) Hao Socheat	Boeung Ket

Awards	Club
Fair Play	CMAC United

== See also ==
- 2017 Cambodian Second League
- 2017 Hun Sen Cup
