= 2015 Cambodian League =

Cambodian League
- Season: 2015
- Champions: Phnom Penh Crown (6th)
- Relegated: None
- Matches: 140
- Goals: 571 (4.08 per match)
- Top goalscorer: Chan Vathanaka (37 goals)
- Biggest home win: Phnom Penh Crown 10-0 Western Phnom Penh
- Biggest away win: Kirivong Sok Sen Chey 2-12 Boeung Ket Angkor
- Highest scoring: Kirivong Sok Sen Chey 2-12 Boeung Ket Angkor, Western Phnom Penh 5-9 Boeung Ket Angkor
- Longest winning run: Boeung Ket Angkor (9 games)
- Longest unbeaten run: Phnom Penh Crown (15 games)
- Longest losing run: Kirivong Sok Sen Chey (10 games)

2015 Cambodian League is the 31st season of the Cambodian League. Contested by 12 clubs, it operates on a system of promotion and relegation with Cambodia Division 1 League. With 12 teams playing 22 games each totaling 132 games in the season. With the newcomer Abilrex Niigata from Japan. However, Albirex has announced that they won't participate in 2015 Cambodian League due to financial crisis and replaced by CMAC United.

Boeung Ket Angkor who finished top of the regular season also qualified for the Mekong Club Championship.

The end of the season was mired in match-fixing claims by Phnom Penh Crown who claimed that several players of the club had under performed. They announced these claims with only the two-legged playoff final remaining.

== Teams ==
- Asia Europe United
- Boeung Ket Angkor
- Build Bright United
- Cambodian Tiger
- CMAC United
- Kirivong Sok Sen Chey
- Nagaworld
- National Defense Ministry
- National Police Commissary
- Phnom Penh Crown
- Svay Rieng
- Western Phnom Penh

== Personnel and sponsoring ==
Team	Sponsor	Kit maker	Team captain	Head coach
Asia Europe United		Pegan	(Cambodia) San Narith	(Cambodia) Nem Sophorn
Boeung Ket Angkor	Angkor Beer	FBT	(Cambodia) Khoun Laboravy	(Cambodia) Prak Sovannara
Build Bright United			(Cambodia) Roem Bunheang	(Cambodia) Nem Sophorn
Cambodian Tiger	FORWARD Group	NT Sport	(Japan) Yasuyuki Yoshida	(Japan) Masakazu Kihara
CMAC United			(Cambodia) Seng Kosen	(Cambodia) Meas Samoeun
Kirivong Sok Sen Chey			(Cambodia) Ream Serng	(Cambodia) Phan Chan Path
Nagaworld	Naga World	FBT	(Japan) Masahiro Fukasawa	(Cambodia) Meas Channa
National Defense Ministry	BMW	Grand Sport	(Cambodia) Khek Khemrin	(Cambodia) Tep Long Rachana
National Police Commissary	Sabay News Online	Joma	(Cambodia) Say Piseth	(Cambodia) Ung Kangyanith
Phnom Penh Crown	CROWN Hotel Resort	FBT	(Cambodia) Boris Kok	(Switzerland) Sam Schweingruber
Svay Rieng	Top 1 Oil	FBT	(Cambodia) Prak Mony Udom	(Cambodia) Som Vandeth
Western Phnom Penh			(Cambodia) Kroch Mol	(Cambodia) Pen Phath

== Foreign players ==
The number of foreign players is restricted to five per team. A team can use three foreign players on the field in each game and one as substitution..

Club	Player 1	Player 2	Player 3	Player 4	Player 5
Asia Europe United	(Nigeria) George Kelechi	(Nigeria) Kenneth Nwafor	(Japan) Reo Nakamura	(Egypt) Mohamed Hamza	(Nigeria) Silva Sunday
Boeung Ket Angkor	(Nigeria) Yemi Joseph	(Japan) Wada Yuya	(Nigeria) Esoh Omogba	(Nigeria) Samuel Ajayi	
Build Bright United	(Nigeria) Joseph Olatubosun	(Nigeria) Rasheed Omokafe	(Nigeria) Degule Momoh	(Ivory Coast) Anderson Zogbe	(Nigeria) Nelson Oladiji
Cambodian Tiger	(Cameroon) Befolo Mbarga	(Japan) Yasuyuki Yoshida	(Japan) Masato Yoshihara	(Japan) Masakazu Kihara	(Japan) Tomohiro Masaki
CMAC United	(Japan) Takahito Ota	(France) Mathieu Vergez	(Nigeria) Ana Yochukwu	(United States) Tony Janzen	(Nigeria) Okereke Timothy
Kirivong	(Vietnam) Phan Truong Chinh	(Sierra Leone) Suma Mustapha	(Nigeria) Adebayo Ademola	(Nigeria) Akeep Ayoyinka	
Nagaworld	(Japan) Ban Kazuaki	(Japan) Masahiro Fukasawa	(Guinea) Barry Lelouma	(Cameroon) Baldwin Ngwa	
National Defense	(Japan) Taku Yanagidate	(Japan) Tatsuta Kazuki	(South Korea) Park Jung	(South Korea) Kim Do Hoon	(South Korea) Jeong Ho Kim
National Police	(Japan) Ippei Shimizu	(Japan) Yusuke Ishii	(Nigeria) Oseika Samuel	(Nigeria) Adekunjo Busayo	
Phnom Penh Crown	(South Korea) Baek Yong-Sun	(Sierra Leone) Santigie Koroma	(Nigeria) George Bisan	(South Africa) Shane Booysen	(Nigeria) Odion Obadin
Svay Rieng	(Rwanda) Kipson Atuheire	(Nigeria) Dzarma Bata	(Japan) Tani Reijin	(Nigeria) Razak Nofiu	(Nigeria) James Michael
Western Phnom Penh	(Nigeria) Chukwu Thankgod	(Australia) Josh Maguire	(Ghana) Tijani Mohammed	(Nigeria) Matthew Osas	(Japan) Tomoyuki Sadakuni

== Stadiums and locations ==
Team	Location	Stadium	Capacity
Asia Europe United	Phnom Penh	Olympic Stadium	50,000
Boeung Ket Angkor	Kampong Cham	RCAF Old Stadium	10,000
Build Bright United	Phnom Penh	Olympic Stadium	50,000
Cambodian Tiger	Phnom Penh	Western Stadium	1,000
CMAC United	Phnom Penh	Olympic Stadium	50,000
Kirivong Sok Sen Chey	Takéo	Olympic Stadium	50,000
Nagaworld	Phnom Penh	Olympic Stadium	50,000
National Defense Ministry	Phnom Penh	RCAF Old Stadium	10,000
National Police Commissary	Phnom Penh	Olympic Stadium	50,000
Phnom Penh Crown	Phnom Penh	RSN Stadium	5,000
Svay Rieng	Svay Rieng	Svay Rieng Stadium	1,500
Western Phnom Penh	Phnom Penh	Western Stadium	1,000

== League table ==
Pos	Team	Pld	W	D	L	GF	GA	GD	Pts	Qualification
1	Boeung Ket Angkor	22	18	3	1	80	25	+55	57	Qualification for the Mekong Club Championship
2	Phnom Penh Crown	22	16	3	3	76	23	+53	51	Qualification Play-Off
3	Cambodian Tiger	22	12	4	6	44	33	+11	40	Qualification Play-Off
4	Nagaworld	22	12	2	8	46	25	+21	38	Qualification Play-Off
5	National Defense Ministry	22	12	2	8	42	28	+14	38	
6	Svay Rieng	22	10	5	7	51	44	+7	35	
7	National Police Commissary	22	10	5	7	31	26	+5	35	
8	Build Bright United	22	7	6	9	39	46	−7	27	
9	CMAC United	22	4	5	13	29	61	−32	17	
10	Asia Europe United	22	4	2	16	36	75	−39	14	
11	Western Phnom Penh	22	4	1	17	37	82	−45	13	
12	Kirivong Sok Sen Chey	22	3	2	17	29	71	−42	11	

Updated to match(es) played on 22 October 2015. Source: FIFA.com
Rules for classification: 1) points; 2) goal difference; 3) number of goals scored.

== Playoffs ==
=== Semi-finals ===
==== First leg ====
2015-10-25
3:30

Boeung Ket Angkor	1-3	Nagaworld
Esoh Paul Omogba 51'		Barry Lelouma 13'; Prak Chanratana 36'; Khim Borey 41'

RCAF Old Stadium, Phnom Penh

2015-10-28
6:00

Phnom Penh Crown	4-1	Cambodian Tiger
In Sodavid 34'; Thierry Bin 54' (pen.); Odion Obadin 87'; Va Sokthorn 90+4'		Befolo Mbarga 50'

RSN Stadium, Phnom Penh

==== Second leg ====
2015-10-28
3:30

Cambodian Tiger	1-2	Phnom Penh Crown
Befolo Mbarga 87'		Odion Obadin 13'; Shane Booysen 24'

Western Stadium, Phnom Penh

2015-11-07
6:00

Nagaworld	1-2	Boeung Ket Angkor
Kouch Sokumpheak 86'		Khoun Laboravy 45+4'; Chan Vathanaka 76' (pen.)

Olympic Stadium, Phnom Penh

=== 3rd place ===
2015-11-22
3:30

Boeung Ket Angkor	4-3	Cambodian Tiger
Khoun Laboravy 39'; Sok Sovan 53'; Wada Yuya 70'; Chan Vathanaka 88'		Befolo Mbarga 13', 90'; Suong Virak 30'

Olympic Stadium, Phnom Penh

2015-12-11
6:00

Cambodian Tiger	1-2	Boeung Ket Angkor
Suong Virak 84'		Rous Samoeun 42', 90+3'

Olympic Stadium, Phnom Penh

Boeung Ket Angkor won 6–4 on aggregate.

=== Final ===
2015-11-22
6:00

Nagaworld	0-2	Phnom Penh Crown
		George Bisan 55'; Shane Booysen 90+5'

Olympic Stadium, Phnom Penh

2015-12-12
6:00

Phnom Penh Crown	1-3 (a.e.t.)	Nagaworld
Thierry Bin 73' (pen.)		Sun Sovannarith 54'; Kouch Sokumpheak 77', 90+3'
Penalties
Thierry Bin (penalty scored); Va Sokthorn (penalty missed); Boris Kok (penalty scored); Odion Obadin (penalty missed); Baek Yong-Sun (penalty scored)	3–2	(penalty missed) Masahiro Fukasawa; (penalty scored) Ban Kazuaki; (penalty scored) Kouch Sokumpheak; (penalty missed) Khim Borey; (penalty missed) Barry Lelouma

Olympic Stadium, Phnom Penh
Referee: Tuy Viccheka

Metfone Cambodian League 2015

6th title

== Top scorers ==
Rank	Player	Club	Goals
1	(Cambodia) Chan Vathanaka	Boeung Ket Angkor	37
2	(Nigeria) George Bisan	Phnom Penh Crown	24
2	(South Africa) Shane Booysen	Phnom Penh Crown	24
4	(Nigeria) Dzarma Bata	Svay Rieng	23
4	(Nigeria) George Kelechi	Asia Europe United	23
6	(Cambodia) Khoun Laboravy	Boeung Ket Angkor	19
6	(Cameroon) Befolo Mbarga	Cambodian Tiger	19
8	(Nigeria) Matthew Osa	Western Phnom Penh	15
8	(Guinea) Barry Lelouma	Nagaworld	15
8	(United States) Tony Janzen	CMAC United	15
11	(Cambodia) Keo Sokpheng	Phnom Penh Crown	12
11	(Nigeria) Rasheed Omokafe	Build Bright United	12
11	(Rwanda) Kipson Atuhaire	Svay Rieng	12
14	(Cambodia) Khim Borey	Nagaworld	10
14	(Nigeria) Okereke Timothy	CMAC United	10
16	(Japan) Masakazu Kihara	Cambodian Tiger	9
16	(Cambodia) Tith Dina	National Police Commissary	9

== Clean sheets ==
Rank	Player	Club	Clean sheets
1	(Cambodia) Yok Ary	Phnom Penh Crown	7
1	(Cambodia) Samrith Seiha	Nagaworld	7
3	(Cambodia) Sou Yaty	Boeung Ket Angkor	6
4	(Cambodia) Um Sereyroth	National Defense Ministry	5
4	(Cambodia) Prak Monyphearun	National Police Commissary	5
6	(Cambodia) Peng Bunchay	Western Phnom Penh/Svay Rieng	4
7	(Japan) Yasuyuki Yoshida	Cambodian Tiger	3
8	(Cambodia) Sos Proshim	Build Bright United	2
8	(Cambodia) Koem Makara	Boeung Ket Angkor	2
10	(Cambodia) San Usarphea	Phnom Penh Crown	1
10	(Cambodia) Ngoy Boranoch	Build Bright United	1
10	(Cambodia) Phorn Ratana	Nagaworld	1
10	(Cambodia) Aim Sovannarath	Svay Rieng	1
10	(Cambodia) Hem Simay	Cambodian Tiger	1
10	(Cambodia) Ouv Kasan	National Defense Ministry	1
10	(Cambodia) Keo Soksela	Phnom Penh Crown	1

== Awards ==
Awards	Nation/Name	Club
The Golden Boot	(Cambodia) Chan Vathanaka	Boeung Ket Angkor
The Player of the Year	(Cambodia) Chan Vathanaka	Boeung Ket Angkor
Goalkeeper of the Year	(Cambodia) Keo Soksela	Phnom Penh Crown
The Coach of the Year	(Cambodia) Prak Sovannara	Boeung Ket Angkor

Awards	Club
Fair Play	Boeung Ket Angkor
