= 2017 Hun Sen Cup =

Tournament details
- Country: Cambodia
- Dates: 18 Jan − 27 Dec 2017
- Teams: 31

Final positions
- Champions: Preah Khan Reach
- Runners-up: Nagaworld

Tournament statistics
- Top goal scorer: Khoun Laboravy (16 goals)

Awards
- Best player: Prak Mony Udom

The Hun Sen Cup was the main football knockout tournament in Cambodia. The 2017 Hun Sen Cup was the 11th season of the Hun Sen Cup, the premier knockout tournament for association football clubs in Cambodia involving Cambodian League and provincial teams organized by the Football Federation of Cambodia.

National Defense Ministry were the defending champions, having beaten Preah Khan Reach Svay Rieng 6–5 on penalty shoot-out after 1-1 extra time in the previous season's final.

== First round ==
The 14 teams from provinces of six zones divided into six groups playing in the first round. Each group was played on a home-and-away round-robin basis. Takeo in Group A and Kampot in Group E directed to Second round due to only one team in their groups. Group winners, runners-up, and the best two third-placed teams advanced to the second round.

=== Group A ===
Pos	Team	Pld	W	D	L	GF	GA	GD	Pts
1	Takeo	0	0	0	0	0	0	0	0

=== Group B ===
Pos	Team	Pld	W	D	L	GF	GA	GD	Pts
1	Prey Veng	4	4	0	0	27	6	+21	12
2	Tbong Khmum	4	1	0	3	?	?	—	3
3	Kandal	4	1	0	3	?	?	—	3

=== Group C ===
Pos	Team	Pld	W	D	L	GF	GA	GD	Pts
1	Siem Reap	6	4	1	1	15	8	+7	13
2	Oddar Meanchey	6	4	1	1	11	4	+7	13
3	Kampong Thom	6	1	2	3	4	11	−7	5
4	Preah Vihear	6	0	2	4	3	10	−7	2

=== Group D ===
Pos	Team	Pld	W	D	L	GF	GA	GD	Pts
1	Kampong Chhnang II	4	1	2	1	4	3	+1	5
2	Pailin	4	1	2	1	2	2	0	5
3	Battambang	4	1	2	1	4	5	−1	5

=== Group E ===
Pos	Team	Pld	W	D	L	GF	GA	GD	Pts
1	Kampot	0	0	0	0	0	0	0	0

=== Group F ===
Pos	Team	Pld	W	D	L	GF	GA	GD	Pts
1	Mondul Kiri	2	1	1	0	3	2	+1	4
2	Stung Treng	2	0	1	1	2	3	−1	1

== Second round ==
=== First leg ===
5 April 2017	Takeo	0−3	Stung Treng	Takeo Stadium

5 April 2017	Prey Veng	5−2	Battambang	Prey Veng Stadium

5 April 2017	Siem Reap	2−0	Pailin	Siem Reap Stadium

5 April 2017	Kampong Chhnang II	2−3	Oddar Meanchey	Kampong Chhnang Stadium

5 April 2017	Kampot	5−1	Tbong Khmum	Kampot Stadium

5 April 2017	Mondul Kiri	1−3	Kampong Thom	Kampong Thom Stadium

=== Second leg ===
26 April 2017	Stung Treng	4−0 (7−0 agg.)	Takeo	Stung Treng Stadium

26 April 2017	Battambang	3−3 (5−8 agg.)	Prey Veng	Battambang Stadium

26 April 2017	Pailin	0−1 (0−3 agg.)	Siem Reap	Pailin Stadium

26 April 2017	Oddar Meanchey	4−1 (7−3 agg.)	Kampong Chhnang II	Oddar Meanchey Stadium

26 April 2017	Tbong Khmum	1−4 (2−9 agg.)	Kampot	Tbong Khmum Stadium

26 April 2017	Kampong Thom	3−2 (6−3 agg.)	Mondulkiri	Kampong Thom Stadium

== Third round ==
A total of 18 teams played in this round. The six winners from the second round, the eight teams from Cambodian Second League (except the championship team Kirivong Sok Sen Chey entered the fourth round) and the four teams from Cambodian League played in the third round. Stung Treng and Oddar Meanchey advanced to the fourth round due to Kampong Speu and Sihanoukville withdrew from the Cup.

=== First leg ===
3 May 2017	Svay Rieng	5−3	Prey Veng	Svay Rieng Stadium

3 May 2017	Electricite du Cambodge	8−0	Siem Reap	Svay Rieng Stadium

4 May 2017	National Police Commissary	2−0	Western Phnom Penh	RCAF Old Stadium

10 May 2017	Bati Youth	3−0	Kampong Thom	Bati National Football Center

10 May 2017	National Defense Youth	0−1	Kampot	RCAF Old Stadium

10 May 2017	Soltilo Angkor	7−1	Kampong Chhnang	Siem Reap Stadium

10 May 2017	CMAC United	0−3	Asia Euro United	RCAF Old Stadium

=== Second leg ===
17 May 2017	Prey Veng	4−4 (7−9 agg.)	Svay Rieng	Prey Veng Stadium

17 May 2017	Siem Reap	0−3 (0−11 agg.)	Electricite du Cambodge	Siem Reap Stadium

17 May 2017	Western Phnom Penh	2−1 (2−3 agg.)	National Police Commissary	Western Stadium

24 May 2017	Kampong Thom	0−2 (0−5 agg.)	Bati Youth	Kampong Thom Stadium

24 May 2017	Kampot	4−2 (5−2 agg.)	Bati Youth	Kampot Stadium

24 May 2017	Kampong Chhnang	1−4 (2−11 agg.)	Soltilo Angkor	Kampong Chhnang Stadium

24 May 2017	Asia Euro United	2−0 (5−0 agg.)	CMAC United	RCAF Old Stadium

== Fourth round ==
A total numbers of 16 teams played in this round. The nine teams (included Stung Treng and Oddar Meanchey) won from the third round, the championship of Cambodian Second League Kirivong Sok Sen Chey and the top six teams of Cambodian League entered the fourth round.

=== First leg ===
31 May 2017	Asia Euro United	0−2	Kirivong Sok Sen Chey	RCAF Old Stadium
18:00

31 May 2017	Phnom Penh Crown	6−0	Bati Youth	RSN Stadium
18:00

31 May 2017	Police Commissary	4−1	Soltilo Angkor	RCAF Old Stadium
15:00

31 May 2017	Preah Khan Reach	8−0	Kampot	Svay Rieng Stadium
18:00

21 Jun 2017	Cambodian Tiger	0−3	Electricite du Cambodge	Siem Reap Stadium
15:00

21 Jun 2017	National Defense	6−0	Stung Treng	RCAF Old Stadium
18:00

24 Jun 2017	Nagaworld	14−0	Svay Rieng	Olympic National Stadium
15:00

24 Jun 2017	Boeung Ket Angkor	14−1	Oddar Meanchey	RCAF Old Stadium
18:00

=== Second leg ===
13 Sep 2017	Svay Rieng	1−3 (1−17 agg.)	Nagaworld	Svay Rieng Stadium
15:00

13 Sep 2017	Electricite du Cambodge	2−4 (5−4 agg.)	Cambodian Tiger	Svay Rieng Stadium
18:00

13 Sep 2017	Stung Treng	0−3 (0−9 agg.)	National Defense
		Report

13 Sep 2017	Oddar Meanchey	2−8 (3−22 agg.)	Boeung Ket Angkor	Oddar Meanchey Stadium
15:00

18 Oct 2017	Kirivong Sok Sen Chey	0−0 (2−0 agg.)	Asia Euro United	Takeo Stadium
15:00

18 Oct 2017	Bati Youth	0−3 (0−9 agg.)	Phnom Penh Crown
15:00		Report

18 Oct 2017	Soltilo Angkor	0−4 (1−8 agg.)	Police Commissary	Siem Reap Stadium
15:00

18 Oct 2017	Kampot	2−6 (2−14 agg.)	Preah Khan Reach	Kampot Stadium
15:00

== Quarter-finals ==
=== First leg ===
25 Oct 2017	National Defense	1−1	Preah Khan Reach	Army Stadium
18:00

25 Oct 2017	Electricite du Cambodge	1−0	Police Commissary	Svay Rieng Stadium
18:00

25 Oct 2017	Kirivong Sok Sen Chey	2−2	Boeung Ket Angkor	Takeo Stadium
15:00

1 Nov 2017	Nagaworld	2−1	Phnom Penh Crown	Olympic National Stadium
18:00

=== Second leg ===
22 Nov 2017	Preah Khan Reach	3−0 (4−1 agg.)	National Defense	Svay Rieng Stadium
18:00

22 Nov 2017	Police Commissary	1−2 (1−3 agg.)	Electricite du Cambodge	Army Stadium
15:30

22 Nov 2017	Boeung Ket Angkor	2−0 (4−2 agg.)	Kirivong Sok Sen Chey	Olympic National Stadium
18:00

22 Nov 2017	Phnom Penh Crown	0−1 (1−3 agg.)	Nagaworld	RSN Stadium
18:00

== Semi-finals ==
=== First leg ===
29 Nov 2017	Preah Khan Reach	2−2	Electricite du Cambodge	Svay Rieng Stadium
18:00

29 Nov 2017	Nagaworld	1−0	Boeung Ket Angkor	Olympic National Stadium
18:00

=== Second leg ===
17 Dec 2017	Electricite du Cambodge	2−4 (a.e.t.) (4−6 agg.)	Preah Khan Reach	Svay Rieng Stadium
18:00

17 Dec 2017	Boeung Ket Angkor	2−3 (2−4 agg.)	Nagaworld	Olympic National Stadium
18:00

== Third place play-off ==
27 Dec 2017
15:00

Boeung Ket Angkor	1–1	Electricite du Cambodge
Khiev Vibol 16'	Report	Mat Noron 90+6' (pen.)
Penalties
Khiev Vibol (penalty scored); Sath Rosib (penalty scored); Sok Pheng (penalty missed); Soeung Sopanha (penalty scored); Rous Samoeun (penalty scored)	4–5	(penalty scored) Chin Chum; (penalty scored) Phany E Ratha; (penalty scored) Sok Chanraksmey; (penalty scored) Chan Dara; (penalty scored) Mat Noron

Olympic National Stadium

== Final ==
27 Dec 2017
18:00

Nagaworld	0–3	Preah Khan Reach
	Report	Sok Samnang 21', 31'; Hoy Phallin 65'

Olympic National Stadium
Referee: Chy Samdy

== Awards ==
- Top goal scorer : Khoun Laboravy of Boeung Ket (16 goals)
- Player of the season : Prak Mony Udom of Preah Khan Reach
- Goalkeeper of the Season : Om Oudom of Preah Khan Reach
- Coach of the season : Sam Vandeth of Preah Khan Reach
- Fair Play: Boeung Ket

== See also ==
- 2017 Cambodian League
- 2017 Cambodian Second League
