= 2016 Hun Sen Cup =

Tournament details
- Country: Cambodia
- Dates: 17 Feb – 2 Jul 2016
- Teams: 27

Final positions
- Champions: National Defense Ministry
- Runners-up: Preah Khan Reach

Tournament statistics
- Top goal scorer: Suong Virak (25 goals)

The Hun Sen Cup was the main football knockout tournament in Cambodia. The 2016 Hun Sen Cup was the 10th season of the Hun Sen Cup, the premier knockout tournament for association football clubs in Cambodia involving Cambodian League and provincial teams organized by the Football Federation of Cambodia.

Preah Khan Reach Svay Rieng were the defending champions, having beaten Nagaworld 2–1 in the previous season's final.

== Qualifying round ==
The 17 teams from provinces of six zones divided into six groups playing in Qualifying round. Each group was played on a home-and-away round-robin basis.

=== Group A ===
Pos	Team	Pld	W	D	L	GF	GA	GD	Pts
1	Kampong Speu	2	1	0	1	4	2	+2	3
2	Kandal Province FC	2	1	0	1	2	4	−2	3

==== First leg ====
2 Mar 2016

Kampong Speu	0 –2	Kandal

Kampong Speu

==== Second leg ====
23 Mar 2016,15:30

Kandal	0 –4	Kampong Speu

Kandal

=== Group B ===
Pos	Team	Pld	W	D	L	GF	GA	GD	Pts
1	Svay Rieng Province FC	6	5	0	1	32	11	+21	15
2	Prey Veng Province FC	6	5	0	1	22	16	+6	15
3	Boeung Ket Youth	6	2	0	4	9	11	−2	6
4	Thbong Khmum Province	6	0	0	6	5	30	−25	0

==== First leg ====
17 Feb 2016,15:30

Boeung Ket Youth	2 –0	Thbong Khmum

Boeung Ket
17 Feb 2016,15:30

Svay Rieng	9 –3	Prey Veng

Svay Rieng

24 Feb 2016,15:30

Thbong Khmum	2 –3	Svay Rieng

Suong
24 Feb 2016,15:30

Prey Veng	4 –3	Beoung Ket Youth

Prey Veng

02 Mar 2016,15:30

Boeung Ket Youth	1 –2	Svay Rieng

Boeung Ket
02 Mar 2016,15:30

Prey Veng	5 –1	Thbong Khmum

Prey Veng

==== Second leg ====
09 Mar 2016,15:30

Thbong Khmum	0 –1	Boeung Ket Youth

Suong
09 Mar 2016,15:30

Prey Veng	3 –1	Svay Rieng

Prey Veng

16 Mar 2016,15:30

Svay Rieng	14 –1	Thbong Khmum

Svay Rieng
16 Mar 2016

Boeung Ket Youth	1 –2	Prey Veng

Boeung Ket

23 Mar 2016,15:30

Svay Rieng	3 –1	Boeung Ket Youth

Svay Rieng
23 Mar 2016,15:30

Thbong Khmum	1 –5	Prey Veng

Suong

=== Group C ===
Pos	Team	Pld	W	D	L	GF	GA	GD	Pts
1	Siem Reap Angkor	6	5	1	0	24	6	+18	16
2	Kampong Thom	6	2	2	2	12	11	+1	8
3	Preah Vihear Province	6	2	0	4	8	20	−12	6
4	Oddar Meanchey	6	1	1	4	8	15	−7	4

==== First leg ====
17 Feb 2016,15:30

Siem Reap	8 –1	Preah Vihear

Siem Reap
17 Feb 2016,15:30

Oddar Meanchey	2 –3	Kampong Thom

Oddar Meanchey

24 Feb 2016,15:30

Preah Vihear	0 –3	Oddar Meanchey

Preah Vihear
24 Feb 2016,15:30

Kampong Thom	0 –1	Siem Reap

Kampong Thom

02 Mar 2016,15:30

Siem Reap	4 –0	Oddar Meanchey

Siem Reap
02 Mar 2016,15:30

Kampong Thom	5 –1	Preah Vihear

Kampong Thom

==== Second leg ====
09 Mar 2016,15:30

Kampong Thom	2 –2	Oddar Meanchey

Kampong Thom
09 Mar 2016,15:30

Preah Vihear	2 –4	Siem Reap

Preah Vihear

16 Mar 2016,15:30

Oddar Meanchey	0 –1	Preah Vihear

Oddar Meanchey
16 Mar 2016,15:30

Siem Reap	2 –2	Kampong Thom

Siem Reap

23 Mar 2016,15:30

Oddar Meanchey	1 –5	Siem Reap

Oddar Meanchey
23 Mar 2016,15:30

Preah Vihear	3 –0	Kampong Thom

Preah Vihear

=== Group D ===
Pos	Team	Pld	W	D	L	GF	GA	GD	Pts
1	Kampong Chhnang	4	3	1	0	8	5	+3	10
2	Pailin Province FC	4	1	1	2	5	6	−1	4
3	Battambang Province FC	4	1	0	3	6	8	−2	3

==== First leg ====
17 Feb 2016,15:30

Kampong Chhnang	3 –2	Battambang

Kampong Chhnang
24 Feb 2016,15:30

Pailin	1 –2	Kampong Chhnang

Pailin
02 Mar 2016,15:30

Battambang	2 –3	Pailin

Battambang

==== Second leg ====
09 Mar 2016,15:30

Battambang	1 –2	Kampong Chhnang

Battambang
16 Mar 2016,15:30

Kampong Chhnang	1 –1	Pailin

Kampong Chhnang
23 Mar 2016,15:30

Pailin	0 –1	Battambang

Pailin

=== Group E ===
Pos	Team	Pld	W	D	L	GF	GA	GD	Pts
1	Sihanoukville	2	1	0	1	5	4	+1	3
2	Kampot Province FC	2	1	0	1	4	5	−1	3

==== First leg ====
17 Feb 2016,15:30

Sihanoukville	5 –1	Kampot

Sihanoukville

==== Second leg ====
24 Feb 2016,15:30

Kampot	3 –0	Sihanoukville

Kampot

=== Group F ===
Pos	Team	Pld	W	D	L	GF	GA	GD	Pts
1	Stung Treng Province FC	2	1	1	0	7	6	+1	4
2	Kratie Province FC	2	0	1	1	6	7	−1	1

==== First leg ====
17 Feb 2016,15:30

Stung Treng	1 –1	Kratie

Stung Treng

==== Second leg ====
24 Feb 2016,15:30

Kratie	2 –2 (3-4)	Stung Treng

Kratie

== Group stage ==
The remaining 14 teams from Qualifying round with the 10 teams of Cambodian League 2015 from rank 1 to 10 (Build Bright United withdrew and replaced by Western Phnom Penh) entered the Group stage. Each group was played on a single round-robin basis at the pre-selected hosts. The teams finishing in the top two positions in each of the four groups (highlighted in tables) in group stage progressed to the quarter-finals.

=== Group A ===
Pos	Team	Pld	W	D	L	GF	GA	GD	Pts
1	Preah Khan Reach	5	4	1	0	47	4	+43	13
2	Cambodian Tiger	5	3	2	0	36	6	+30	11
3	Kampong Chhnang	5	3	1	1	8	16	−8	10
4	Sihanoukville	5	2	0	3	8	19	−11	6
5	Boeung Ket Youth	5	1	0	4	6	15	−9	3
6	Kandal Province FC	5	0	0	5	4	49	−45	0

30 Mar 2016,15:30

Kampong Chhnang	2 –2	Cambodian Tiger

Kampong Chhnang Stadium
30 Mar 2016,15:30

Sihanoukville	1 –0	Boeung Ket Youth

Life University Stadium (Sihanoukville)
23 Apr 2016,18:00

Preah Khan Reach	18 –0	Kandal

Svay Rieng Stadium

20 Apr 2016,15:30

Cambodian Tiger	18 –0	Kandal

Western Stadium
20 Apr 2016,15:30

Kampong Chhnang	1 –0	Boeung Ket Youth

Kampong Chhnang Stadium
20 Apr 2016,18:00

Preah Khan Reach	11 –0	Sihanoukville

Svay Rieng Stadium

04 May 2016,15:30

Boeung Ket Youth	1 –3	Preah Khan Reach

Kampong Cham Stadium
04 May 2016,15:30

Kandal	1 –3	Kampong Chhnang

Kandal Province Football Field
04 May 2016,15:30

Cambodian Tiger	5 –0	Sihanoukville

Olympic Stadium

18 May 2016,15:30

Boeung Ket Youth	1 –8	Cambodian Tiger

Kampong Cham Stadium
18 May 2016,15:30

Sihanoukville	6 –1	Kandal

Life University Stadium (Sihanoukville)
18 May 2016,18:30

Preah Khan Reach	12 –0	Kampong Chhnang

Svay Rieng Stadium

08 Jun 2016,15:30

Kandal	2 –4	Boeung Ket Youth

Kandal Province Football Field
08 Jun 2016,15:30

Cambodian Tiger	3 –3	Preah Khan Reach

Western Stadium
08 Jun 2016,15:30

Kampong Chhnang	2 –1	Sihanoukville

Kampong Chhnang Stadium

=== Group B ===
Pos	Team	Pld	W	D	L	GF	GA	GD	Pts
1	National Defense Ministry	5	5	0	0	46	2	+44	15
2	Boeung Ket Angkor	5	4	0	1	31	7	+24	12
3	Asia Euro United	5	3	0	2	16	7	+9	9
4	Stung Treng Province FC	5	1	1	3	11	32	−21	4
5	Prey Veng FC	5	1	1	3	4	26	−22	4
6	Kampong Thom	5	0	0	5	6	40	−34	0

30 Mar 2016,15:30

Stung Treng	5 – 2	Kampong Thom

Stung Treng Stadium
30 Mar 2016,15:30

National Defense	8 – 0	Prey Veng

Army Stadium
30 Mar 2016,18:00

Asia Euro United	1 – 2	Boeung Ket Angkor

Olympic Stadium

20 Apr 2016,15:30

Boeung Ket Angkor	12 – 0	Prey Veng

Olympic Stadium
20 Apr 2016,15:30

National Defense	21 – 0	Stung Treng

Army Stadium
20 Apr 2016,18:00

Asia Euro United	8 – 1	Kampong Thom

Olympic Stadium

04 May 2016,15:30

Kampong Thom	1 – 12	National Defense

Kampong Thom Stadium
04 May 2016,15:30

Prey Veng	0 – 3	Asia Euro United

Prey Veng Football Field
04 May 2016,18:00

Boeung Ket Angkor	5 – 4	Stung Treng

Olympic Stadium

18 May 2016,15:30

Stung Treng	1 – 1	Prey Veng

Stung Treng Stadium
18 May 2016,15:30

Kampong Thom	0 – 12	Boeung Ket Angkor

Kampong Thom Stadium
18 May 2016,18:00

National Defense	3 – 1	Asia Euro United

Army Stadium

08 Jun 2016,15:30

Prey Veng	3 – 2	Kampong Thom

Prey Veng Football Field
08 Jun 2016,15:30

Asia Euro United	3 – 1	Stung Treng

Olympic Stadium
08 Jun 2016,18:00

Boeung Ket Angkor	0 – 2	National Defense

Olympic Stadium

=== Group C ===
Pos	Team	Pld	W	D	L	GF	GA	GD	Pts
1	Phnom Penh Crown	5	4	1	0	41	1	+40	13
2	CMAC United	5	4	1	0	17	5	+12	13
3	Western Phnom Penh	5	3	0	2	28	9	+19	9
4	Pailin Province FC	5	1	1	3	5	30	−25	4
5	Kampong Speu	5	1	1	3	6	37	−31	4
6	Kompot Province FC	5	0	0	5	4	19	−15	0

06 Apr 2016,15:30

Western Phnom Penh	0 – 5	Phnom Penh Crown

Western Stadium
06 Apr 2016,15:30

CMAC United	6 – 1	Pailin

Olympic Stadium
06 Apr 2016,15:30

Kampong Speu	2 – 1	Kampot

Kampong Speu Stadium

27 Apr 2016,15:30

Western Phnom Penh	9 – 1	Kampot

Western Stadium
27 Apr 2016,15:30

CMAC United	8 – 3	Pailin

Army Stadium
27 Apr 2016,18:00

Phnom Penh Crwon	16 – 0	Pailin

RSN Stadium

11 May 2016,18:00

Pailin	1 – 6	Western Phnom Penh

Western Stadium
11 May 2016,18:00

Phnom Penh Crwon	15 – 0	Kampong Speu

RSN Stadium
11 May 2016,18:00

Kampot	0 – 1	CMAC United

Kampot Stadium

25 May 2016,15:30

Kampong Speu	1 – 1	Pailin

Kampong Speu Stadium
25 May 2016,15:30

Kampot	1 – 5	Phnom Penh Crwon

Kampot Stadium
25 May 2016,15:30

CMAC United	2 – 1	Western Phnom Penh

Olympic Stadium

15 Jun 2016,15:30

Western Phnom Penh	12 – 0	Kampong Speu

Western Stadium
15 Jun 2016,15:30

Pailin	2 – 1	Kampot

Pailin Stadium
15 Jun 2016,18:00

Phnom Penh Crwon	0 – 0	CMAC United

RSN Stadium

=== Group D ===
Pos	Team	Pld	W	D	L	GF	GA	GD	Pts
1	Nagaworld	5	5	0	0	32	2	+30	15
2	Siem Reap Angkor FC	5	3	1	1	18	6	+12	10
3	Police Commissary	5	2	2	1	25	7	+18	8
4	Svay Rieng Province FC	5	2	1	2	12	13	−1	7
5	Kratie Province FC	5	1	0	4	5	35	−30	3
6	Preah Vihear Province FC	5	0	0	5	0	29	−29	0

06 Apr 2016,15:30

Kratie	0 – 3	Siem Reap

Provincial Stadium (Kratie)
06 Apr 2016,15:30

Preah Vihear	0 – 9	Police Commissary

Preah Vihear Soccer Field
06 Apr 2016,18:00

Nagaworld	6 – 0	Svay Rieng

Olympic Stadium

27 Apr 2016,15:30

Siem Reap	11 – 0	Preah Vihear

Siem Reap Stadium
27 Apr 2016,15:30

Nagaworld	16 – 1	Kratie

Olympic Stadium
27 Apr 2016,18:00

Police Commissary	3 – 3	Svay Rieng

Olympic Stadium

11 May 2016,15:30

Siem Reap	0 – 4	Nagaworld

Siem Reap Stadium
11 May 2016,15:30

Svay Rieng	3 – 0	Preah Vihear

Svay Rieng Stadium
11 May 2016,18:00

Police Commissary	11 – 0	Kratie

Olympic Stadium

25 May 2016,15:30

Svay Rieng	5 – 1	Kratie

Svay Rieng Stadium
25 May 2016,15:30

Preah Vihea	0 – 3	Nagaworld

Preah Vihear Soccer Field
25 May 2016,18:00

Police Commissary	1 – 1	Siem Reap

Olympic Stadium

15 Jun 2016,15:30

Siem Reap	3 – 1	Svay Rieng

Siem Reap Stadium
15 Jun 2016,15:30

Kratie	3 – 0	Preah Vihear

Provincial Stadium (Kratie)
15 Jun 2016,18:00

Nagaworld	3 – 1	Police Commissary

Olympic Stadium

== Knockout stage ==
=== Quarter-finals ===
22 June 2016
15:30

Preah Khan Reach Svay Rieng	2 –1	Boeung Ket Angkor
Mony Udom 42'; Kriya 85'		Teab Vathanak 47'

Army Stadium, Phnom Penh
22 June 2016
15:30

National Defense Ministry	4 – 0	Cambodian Tiger
Polroth 4' ? 35' (o.g.); Bunheing 44'; Phearith 55'

RSN Stadium, Phnom Penh
22 June 2016
15:30

Phnom Penh Crown	4– 0	Siem Reap Angkor
Sodavid 10'; Sokpheng 45+1'; Sokngon 45+3'; Ponvuthy 68'

Olympic National Stadium, Phnom Penh
22 June 2016
18:00

Nagaworld	1– 2	CMAC United
Sovannarith 65' (pen.)		Phearak 6'; Makara 90+3'

Olympic National Stadium, Phnom Penh

=== Semi-finals ===
29 June 2016
15:30

Preah Khan Reach Svay Rieng	0–0 (a.e.t.)	Phnom Penh Crown
	Report
Penalties
Nen Sothearoth (penalty scored); Hoy Phallin (penalty missed); Sam Oeun Pidor (penalty scored); Sareth Kriya (penalty scored)	3–2	(penalty missed) Boris Kok; (penalty missed) Orn Chanpolin; (penalty scored) Chhom Pisa; (penalty scored) In Sodavid; (penalty missed) Thierry Bin

Olympic National Stadium, Phnom Penh
29 June 2016
18:30

National Defense Ministry	3– 0	CMAC United
Chhin Chhoeun 46', 79'; Ke Vannak 68'	Report

Olympic National Stadium, Phnom Penh

=== Third place play-off ===
2 July 2016
15:30

Phnom Penh Crown	1 – 0	CMAC United
In Sodavid 87'	Report

Olympic National Stadium, Phnom Penh

=== Final ===
2 July 2016
19:00

National Defense Ministry	1 – 1 (a.e.t.)	Preah Khan Reach Svay Rieng
Reung Bunheing 80'	Report	Sareth Kriya 88'
Penalties
Chrerng Polroth (penalty scored); Sok Heang (penalty scored); Op Kamol (penalty missed); Chhin Choeun (penalty scored); Khek Khemrin (penalty scored); Um Sereyroth (penalty missed); Sor Piseth (penalty scored); Reung Bunheing (penalty scored)	6-5	(penalty scored) Oum Outdom (First shot); (penalty scored) Soeuy Visal; (penalty missed) Hoy Phallin; (penalty scored) Sam Oeun Pidor; (penalty scored) Nen Sothearoth; (penalty missed) Prak Sovanpiseth; (penalty scored) Sareth Kriya; (penalty missed) Chea Samnang

Olympic National Stadium, Phnom Penh

== Awards ==
- Top goal scorer (The Golden Boot): Suong Virak of Cambodian Tiger (25 goals)
- Goalkeeper of the Season (The Golden Glove): Um Sereyroth of National Defense Ministry
- Fair Play: Phnom Penh Crown

== See also ==
- 2016 Cambodian League
- Cambodian League
- Hun Sen Cup
