= Masakazu Kihara =

Japanese footballer

Personal information
- Full name: Masakazu Kihara
- Date of birth: April 19, 1987 (age 39)
- Place of birth: Yamaguchi, Japan
- Height: 1.65 m (5 ft 5 in)
- Position: Midfielder

Youth career
- Hanagi FC
- Kuwanoyama Junior High School
- 2003–2005: Sanfrecce Hiroshima

College career
Years	Team	Apps	(Gls)
2006–2009	Hannan University		

Senior career*
Years	Team	Apps	(Gls)
2010–2011	Omiya Ardija	1	(0)
2012–2013	Avispa Fukuoka	24	(3)
2014–2016	Cambodian Tiger	43	(18)

Managerial career
- 2015–2016: Cambodian Tiger
- * Club domestic league appearances and goals

Masakazu Kihara (木原 正和, Kihara Masakazu; born April 19, 1987) is a Japanese football player.

== Club statistics ==
Club performance			League		Cup		League Cup		Total	
Season	Club	League	Apps	Goals	Apps	Goals	Apps	Goals	Apps	Goals
Japan			League		Emperor's Cup		J.League Cup		Total	
2010	Omiya Ardija	J1 League	1	0	1	0	0	0	2	0
2011	Omiya Ardija	J1 League	0	0	0	0	0	0	0	0
2012	Avispa Fukuoka	J2 League	23	3	2	0	-	-	25	3
2013	Avispa Fukuoka	J2 League	1	0	0	0			1	0
2014	Cambodian Tiger	Metfone C-League	15	5	-	-	-	-	15	5
2015	Cambodian Tiger	Metfone C-League	14	9	-	-	-	-	14	9
2016	Cambodian Tiger	Metfone C-League	14	4	-	-	-	-	14	4
Total			68	21	3	0	0	0	71	21
