= Peng Bunchay =

Cambodian footballer

Personal information
- Full name: Peng Bunchay
- Date of birth: 22 April 1992 (age 34)
- Place of birth: Cambodia
- Height: 1.74 m (5 ft 8 1/2 in)
- Position: Goalkeeper

Senior career*
Years	Team	Apps	(Gls)
2006–2011	Phnom Penh Crown		
2011–2015	Boeung Ket Angkor		
2015	Western Phnom Penh	11	(0)
2015–2016	Preah Khan Reach Svay Rieng	8	(0)
2016	National Defense Ministry	0	(0)
2016	Western Phnom Penh	13	(0)

International career
2015	Cambodia U-23	0	(0)
2011	Cambodia	1	(0)
- * Club domestic league appearances and goals

Peng Bunchay (born 22 April 1992 in Cambodia) is a footballer for Western Phnom Penh in the Cambodian League.

== Honours ==
=== Club ===
Phnom Penh Crown

- Cambodian League: 2008, 2010, 2011
- Hun Sen Cup: 2008, 2009
- 2011 AFC President's Cup: Runner up

Boeung Ket Rubber Field

- Cambodian League: 2012

=== Individual ===
- Cambodian League Best Goalkeeper: 2011, 2012
