= Chan Vathanaka =

Cambodian footballer (born 1994)

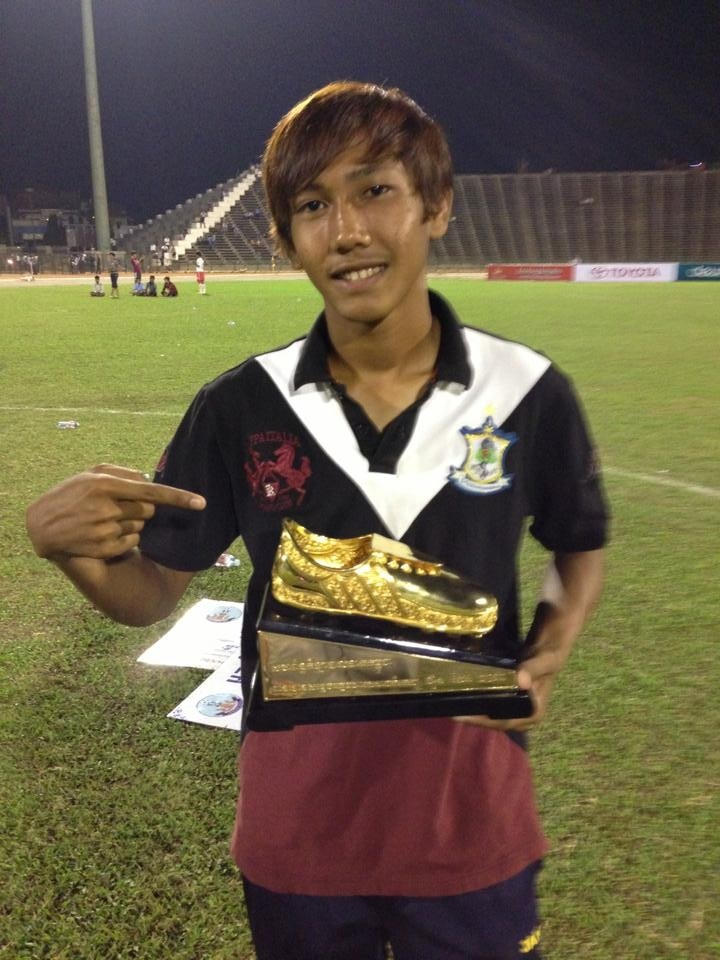
- Vanthanaka in 2014

Personal information
- Date of birth: 23 January 1994 (age 32)
- Place of birth: Kampot, Cambodia
- Height: 1.73 m (5 ft 8 in)
- Positions: Winger; forward

Team information
- Current team: Boeung Ket
- Number: 11

Youth career
- 2010–2011: Svay Rieng

Senior career*
Years	Team	Apps	(Gls)
2011–2012	Svay Rieng	17	(10)
2012–2017	Boeung Ket	90	(101)
2017	→ Fujieda MYFC (loan)	0	(0)
2018	Pahang FA	10	(1)
2018	Boeung Ket	9	(5)
2019	PKNS	15	(2)
2019–	Boeung Ket	59	(27)

International career
2011	Cambodia U19	3	(0)
2012–2015	Cambodia U23	25	(11)
2013–	Cambodia	52	(19)
Khmer name
Khmer	ចាន់ វឌ្ឍនាកា
Romanization	Chăn Vodthônéaka
IPA	[can ʋɔət.tʰĕə.naː.kaː]
- * Club domestic league appearances and goals

Chan Vathanaka (Khmer: ចាន់ វឌ្ឍនាកា [can ʋɔət.tʰĕə.naː.kaː]; born 23 January 1994) is a Cambodian professional footballer who plays as a winger or a forward for Boeung Ket Angkor and for the Cambodia national team.

== Club career ==
=== Preah Khan Reach Svay Rieng ===
Vathanaka played for the senior team of Preah Khan Reach during the 2011–12 season.

=== Boeung Ket Angkor ===
Vathanaka signed a contract with Boeung Ket in 2012.

On 1 August 2015, Vathanaka scored all six goals in a 6–0 win over Asia Europe United. Impressively, this was not even his best accomplishment; in a 12–2 over Kirivong Sok Sen Chey on 11 July 2015 Vathanaka scored eight goals, the highest tally for a Cambodian-born player in the league, as well as giving him 16 goals in the first 8 games of the 2015 season.

In the semifinals of the 2015 Mekong Club Championship Vathanaka scored all three goals in a 3–2 win over Becamex Bình Dương, putting Boeung Ket Angkor in the final. Although Boeung Ket Angkor lost in the final to Buriram United, Vathanaka finished the tournament as the highest goalscorer, with five goals, and was also named best player.

Vathanaka finished the 2015 league season with 35 goals, a total of 55 goals in all competitions including national and club, the most of any Southeast Asian player.

In his first start of the 2016 season Vathanaka scored a hat-trick in under five minutes as Boeung Ket Angkor beat CMAC FC 6–0.

In a match against Svay Rieng on 21 May 2016 Vathanaka scored goals in the 85th, 89th, and 90+3rd minute as his team came from behind to win 3–1. The first goal, an audacious left-foot volley from a cross, was touted of one of the goals of the 2016 season.

Vathanaka finished the 2016 Cambodian League as the top scorer for the second consecutive year with 22 goals, as his team Boeung Ket Angkor dramatically won the title on the last match day by a single point.

=== Fujiyeda MYFC ===
During the 2016 season, Vathanaka was loaned out to J3 League side Fujieda MYFC. Donning his iconic number 11 shirt, Vathanaka didn't start a single game during his loan spell there, making only a single last minute substitution.

=== Pahang FA ===
In December 2017, Vathanaka signed for Pahang FA for the upcoming season after a disappointing spell in Japan. He has since been released from Pahang FA to be replaced by Issey Nakajima in an article by FOX Sports Asia.

=== PKNS FC ===
After Vathanaka was released from Pahang FA, Vathanaka came back to Cambodia to rejoin his former club Boeung Ket Angkor.

On 18 January 2019, PKNS FC signed Vathanaka on a free contract according to an Article. He was given the number 29 jersey instead of number 11 in which his famous CV11 became CV29. This was by far his most successful season playing oversea where he made over 13 appearances in the Liga Super. He only made 10 appearances at Pahang FA in that same league.

== International career ==
He made his senior international debut on 22 March 2013 in a 2014 AFC Challenge Cup qualification match against Turkmenistan.

Vathanaka played an important part in Cambodia's campaign in the 2018 World Cup qualification. In the first qualifying game he came off the bench to score two goals, the second a thunderous free-kick, in a 3–0 home win over Macau. On 28 July 2016 Vathanaka scored another free kick against Singapore in a friendly match.

He was part of the Cambodia national team for the 2016 AFF Cup and scored two goals against Malaysia in the group stage. He went on to represent the Koupreys in two more AFF Cups.

== Career statistics ==
=== Club ===
Club performance			League		Cup		Continental		Total	
Club	Season	League	Apps	Goals	Apps	Goals	Apps	Goals	Apps	Goals
Boeung Ket	2013	Cambodian League	17	11	4	11	3	4	24	26
Boeung Ket	2014	Cambodian League	19	11					19	11
Boeung Ket	2015	Cambodian League	22	37			4	5	26	42
Boeung Ket	2016	Cambodian League	18	22					18	22
Boeung Ket	2019	Cambodian League	12	4					12	4
Boeung Ket	2020	Cambodian League	7	1					7	1
Boeung Ket	2021	Cambodian League	17	13					17	13
Boeung Ket	2023-24	Cambodian League	16	8					16	8
Boeung Ket	2024-25	Cambodian League	6	1					6	1
Boeung Ket	2025-26	Cambodian League	1	0					1	0
Boeung Ket	Total		135	108	4	11	7	9	146	128
Fujieda MYFC	2017	J3 League	1	0	1	0			2	0
Pahang	2018	Super League	10	1	2	0			12	1
Selangor	2019	Super League	15	2	1	1			16	3
Total career			161	111	8	12	7	9	176	132

=== International ===
As of 2 December 2023

National team	Year	Apps	Goals
Cambodia
Cambodia	2013	2	0
Cambodia	2014	6	2
Cambodia	2015	6	2
Cambodia	2016	14	6
Cambodia	2017	9	3
Cambodia	2018	8	3
Cambodia	2021	4	3
Cambodia	2023	3	0
Cambodia	Total	52	19

== International goals ==
=== Senior ===
Scores and results list Cambodia's goal tally first.

Chan Vathanaka – goals for Cambodia
#	Date	Venue	Opponent	Score	Result	Competition
1.	8 October 2014	Taipei Municipal Stadium, Taipei, Chinese Taipei	Chinese Taipei	1–0	2–0	Friendly
2.	8 October 2014	Taipei Municipal Stadium, Taipei, Chinese Taipei	Chinese Taipei	2–0	2–0	Friendly
3.	12 March 2015	Phnom Penh Olympic Stadium, Phnom Penh, Cambodia	Macau	1–0	3–0	2018 FIFA World Cup qualification
4.	12 March 2015	Phnom Penh Olympic Stadium, Phnom Penh, Cambodia	Macau	2–0	3–0	2018 FIFA World Cup qualification
5.	28 July 2016	Phnom Penh Olympic Stadium, Phnom Penh, Cambodia	Singapore	1–0	2–1	Friendly
6.	1 September 2016	Mong Kok Stadium, Mong Kok, Hong Kong	Hong Kong	2–3	2–4	Friendly
7.	21 October 2016	Phnom Penh Olympic Stadium, Phnom Penh, Cambodia	Timor-Leste	2–0	3–2	2016 AFF Championship qualification
8.	21 October 2016	Phnom Penh Olympic Stadium, Phnom Penh, Cambodia	Timor-Leste	3–2	3–2	2016 AFF Championship qualification
9.	20 November 2016	Thuwunna Stadium, Yangon, Myanmar	Malaysia	1–0	2–3	2016 AFF Championship
10.	20 November 2016	Thuwunna Stadium, Yangon, Myanmar	Malaysia	2–1	2–3	2016 AFF Championship
11.	22 March 2017	Phnom Penh Olympic Stadium, Phnom Penh, Cambodia	India	2–3	2–3	Friendly
12.	5 September 2017	Phnom Penh Olympic Stadium, Phnom Penh, Cambodia	Vietnam	1–1	1–2	2019 AFC Asian Cup qualification
13.	5 October 2017	Patriot Candrabhaga Stadium, Bekasi, Indonesia	Indonesia	1–2	1–3	Friendly
14.	12 October 2018	Phnom Penh Olympic Stadium, Phnom Penh, Cambodia	Timor-Leste	1–1	2–2	Friendly
15.	12 November 2018	Mandalarthiri Stadium, Mandalay, Myanmar	Myanmar	1–0	1–4	2018 AFF Championship
16.	20 November 2018	Phnom Penh Olympic Stadium, Phnom Penh, Cambodia	Laos	1–0	3–1	2018 AFF Championship
17.	9 October 2021	Khalifa Sports City Stadium, Isa Town, Bahrain	Guam	1–0	1–0	2023 AFC Asian Cup qualification
18.	15 December 2021	Bishan Stadium, Bishan, Singapore	Laos	1–0	3–0	2020 AFF Championship
19.	15 December 2021	Bishan Stadium, Bishan, Singapore	Laos	2–0	3–0	2020 AFF Championship

=== Under-23 ===
Chan Vathanaka – goals for Cambodia U23
#	Date	Venue	Opponent	Score	Result	Competition
1.	22 March 2015	Jurong West, Singapore	Singapore	1–1	2–2	Friendly
2.	22 March 2015	Jurong West, Singapore	Singapore	2–1	2–2	Friendly
3.	31 March 2015	Bangkok, Thailand	Philippines	1–0	3–1	2016 AFC U-23 Championship qualification
4.	31 March 2015	Bangkok, Thailand	Philippines	2–0	3–1	2016 AFC U-23 Championship qualification
5.	3 June 2015	Kallang, Singapore	Philippines	3–1	3–1	2015 Southeast Asian Games
6.	8 June 2015	Kallang, Singapore	Singapore	1–2	3–1	2015 Southeast Asian Games
7.	10 June 2015	Kallang, Singapore	Myanmar	3–1	3–3	2015 Southeast Asian Games

== Honours ==
=== Club ===
Boeung Ket

- Cambodian League: 2016, 2017
- Hun Sen Cup: 2019
- 2015 Mekong Club Championship: Runner up

=== Individual ===
- 2012 Cambodian League 'Best Young Player of the Year'
- 2013 Hun Sen Cup 'Golden Boot'
- 2014 Cambodian League 'Player of the Season'
- 2015 Cambodian League 'Player of the Season'
- 2015 Cambodian League 'Golden Boot'
- 2015 Mekong Club Championship: 'Most Valuable Player'
- 2016 Cambodian League 'Player of the Season'
- 2016 Cambodian League 'Golden Boot'
- 2017 FFC 'Best Player of The Year'

== Personal life ==
Since October 2015 Vathanaka has celebrated goals by kissing a tattoo on his right arm. The tattoo is a memorial to his parents and family. Vathanaka also has a passion for karaoke and music; when he was injured in September 2015 he spent seven hours singing and recording songs with Cambodian singer Meas Soksophea.

In January 2016 Vathanaka became a goodwill ambassador for the cellphone company SEATEL.
