= 2017 Cambodian Second League =

Cambodian Second League
- Season: 2017
- Champions: Visakha FC
- Promoted: Visakha, Soltilo Angkor
- Top goalscorer: Nuth Sinoun (18 goals)

The Cambodian Second League is organized by the Football Federation of Cambodia. There are seven teams in the competition, each team played on a home-and-away round-robin basis. The top four teams progressed to the play-off round, and the two teams in the finals promoted to 2018 Cambodian League. Two teams (Bati Academy and Ministry of National Defense Academy) among seven teams cannot go through to the 2018 Cambodian League, due to Bati Academy is the team founded by FFC and Ministry of National Defense FC Academy are the reserve team of Ministry of National Defense FC, who played in the top Cambodian League.

== League table ==
Pos.	Team	GP	W	D	L	GF	GA	GD	Pts
1	Visakha	12	11	0	1	60	8	52	33
2	Bati Academy	12	8	1	3	45	23	22	25
3	Ministry of National Defense Academy	12	7	1	4	24	16	8	22
4	Soltilo Angkor	12	5	2	5	22	18	4	17
5	Svay Rieng	12	2	3	7	24	34	-10	9
6	Kampong Cham	12	2	3	7	18	32	-14	9
7	Kampong Chhnang	12	0	2	10	5	57	-52	2

== Knockout stage ==
=== Quarter-finals ===
24 Sept 2017

National Defense Youth	5 –0	Soltilo Angkor

=== Semi-finals ===
1 Oct 2017

Bati Academy	5 –3	Ministry of National Defense Academy

=== Final ===
15 Oct 2017
18:00

Visakha	2–0	Bati Academy

Olympic National Stadium

== Awards ==
- The player of the season: Sieng Chanthea of Bati Academy
- Top goal scorer: Nuth Sinoun of Visakha FC (18 goals)
- The goalkeeper of the season: Chea Vansak of Visakha FC
- The coach of the season: Hok Sochivorn of Visakha FC

== See also ==
- 2017 Cambodian League
- 2017 Hun Sen Cup
