= Atuheire Kipson =

Rwandan footballer

Personal information
- Full name: Atuheire Kipson
- Date of birth: 8 August 1991 (age 35)
- Place of birth: Kampala, Uganda
- Height: 1.73 m (5 ft 8 in)
- Position: Striker

Senior career*
Years	Team	Apps	(Gls)
2008–2009	AS Kigali		
2009–2010	SC Villa Kampala		
2010–2012	APR Kigali		
2012–2013	URA Kampala		
2013–2014	Police Kibungo		
2014–2015	Musanze		
2015–2016	Svay Rieng		(24)
2017	Nagaworld	23	(27)
2018	UKM	11	(5)
2019–2020	Nagaworld	23	(22)
2020	Gokulam Kerala	5	(0)
2020–2022	Wakiso Giants	9	(5)
2022	Soltilo Angkor	8	(7)
2023–2024	Koh Kong	0	(0)
2024–2025	Life		

International career
2010	Rwanda	5	(0)
- * Club domestic league appearances and goals as of 7 April 2025

Atuheire Kipson (born 8 August 1991) is a former professional footballer who last played as a forward for Life in the Cambodian Premier League. Born in Uganda, he represented the Rwanda national team.

== Club career ==
=== Days in Rwanda and Uganda ===
Born in Kabale, Western region of Uganda, Kipson moved to Rwanda and began his professional football career at A.S. Kigali in 2008. Between 2009 and 2010, he signed with and played for Ugandan giants SC Villa Kampala in the Uganda Premier League. With SC Villa, he won the Uganda Cup in 2009. It was his first major professional win and then he moved to Armée Patriotique Rwandaise Football Club in Rwanda again. With APR, he won the Rwanda Premier League twice in 2010 and 2011.

In 2012, he moved to Uganda Revenue Authority SC and emerged as the runners-up of the Uganda Premier League. Kipson has also played for clubs like Rwanda Police FC and Musanze F.C. before leaving Africa.

=== Cambodia ===
He went to Cambodia in 2015 and joined Preah Khan Reach Svay Rieng FC, with which he lifted the Hun Sen Cup in 2015. He was also in the squad of the Svay Rieng in 2016 Hun Sen Cup runners-up squad. In 2015 and 2016 season with Svay Rieng, he scored 24 goals.

Kipson also achieved success and fame during his stint in another Cambodian club Nagaworld FC. He appeared in 23 Cambodian Premier League matches and scored 28 goals in 2017. Later he moved to Malaysian side UKM F.C. but came back to Nagaworld FC in 2019. Kipson with Nagaworld, finished as the runners-up of 2017 Hun Sen Cup and 2019 C-League.

On 20 November 2017, Kipson scored his first hat-trick for Nagaworld FC against Asia Europe United in the C-League. With Nagaworld in 2019–2020 season, he scored 22 goals in 23 league games. In 2019 AFC Cup, Kipson appeared for Nagaworld FC in 6 matches of Group-F. In that competition, he scored 2 goals in a match against Yangon United FC. He achieved fame for his continuous goalscoring ability for both the Cambodian clubs Nagaworld FC and Svay Rieng FC between 2015 and 2020.

=== India ===
On 10 February 2020, Kipson signed with Indian I-League side Gokulam Kerala FC. He debuted for the Malabarians on 12 February against Chennai City. He appeared in only 5 league matches for them and later released by the club. He alongside other foreigners of Gokulam Kerala was stuck in India due to the nationwide lockdown amidst the Coronavirus pandemic for couple of days before his flight to Uganda.

=== Back to Uganda ===
Kipson after his success in Cambodia and unsuccessful days in India due to the pandemic (2020 I-League was cancelled), returned to Uganda for signing with Wakiso Giants FC. Debutant Kipson scored for Wakiso Giants as they edged Mbarara City FC to get off their first win of the season. Former SC Villa striker scored the winner in the second half before Mbarara City went on to miss a penalty.

== International career ==
Kipson has represented Rwanda national football team on 5 occasions in 2010. He debuted for his country on 9 October against Benin in a 3–0 win match at the 2012 African Cup of Nations. He then appeared in a friendly match against Malawi.

He had also represented Rwanda in the 2010 CECAFA Cup in Tanzania, where he played three matches until Rwanda lost to Tanzania in the Quarter-finals.

== Honours ==
SC Villa Kampala

- Uganda Cup: 2009

Armée Patriotique Rwandaise

- Rwanda Premier League: 2010, 2011

Preah Khan Reach Svay Rieng

- Hun Sen Cup: 2015, 2016

NagaWorld

- Cambodian Premier League: 2019
- Hun Sen Cup: 2017

Life

- Cambodian League 2: 2023-24
