= Choe Myong-ho =

North Korean footballer (born 1988)

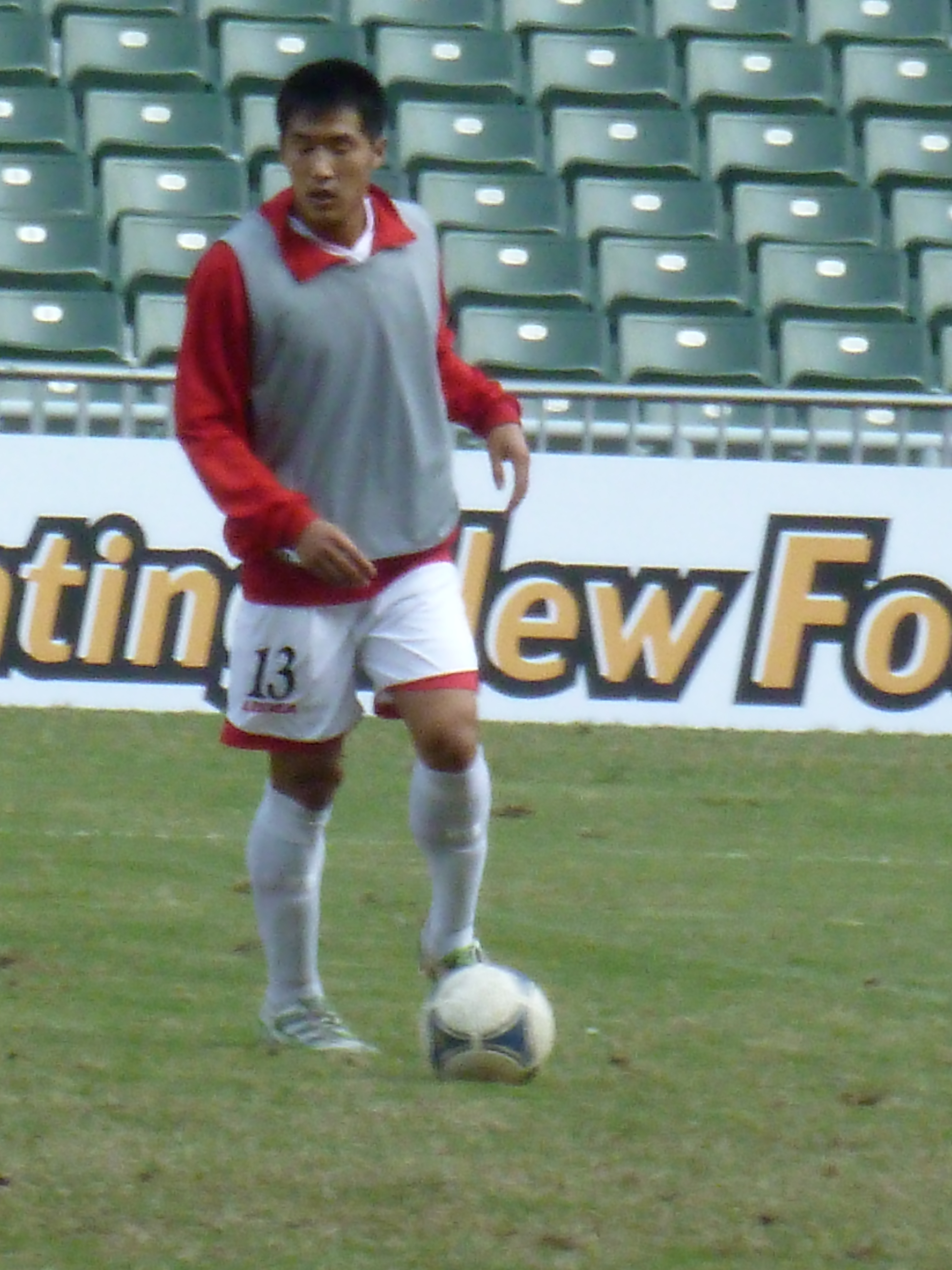

Personal information
- Date of birth: 3 July 1988 (age 38)
- Place of birth: Pyongyang, North Korea
- Height: 1.72 m (5 ft 7 1/2 in)
- Position: Striker

Youth career
- 2003–2004: Kyonggongopsong

Senior career*
Years	Team	Apps	(Gls)
2005–2006	Kyonggongopsong	20	(3)
2006–2008	Krylia Sovetov Samara	1	(0)
2009–2016	Pyongyang	27	(12)
2016–2017	National Defense Ministry	40	(44)
2018	Visakha	12	(9)
Total		100	(68)

International career
2004–2006	North Korea U-17	10	(5)
2008–2012	North Korea	12	(2)
- * Club domestic league appearances and goals

- Choe Myong-ho
- Hangul: 최명호
- RR: Choe Myeongho
- MR: Ch'oe Myŏngho

Choe Myong-ho (Korean: 최명호, born 3 July 1988) is a North Korean former footballer.

== Club career ==
Born in Pyongyang, Choe was one of the first native North Koreans to join a club abroad, Krylia Sovetov Samara of the Russian Premier League and the first to play in Russia.

He was selected as the 2005 AFC Youth Player of the Year.

Before moving to Russia, Choe Myong-ho had played for the Ministry of Light Industry team (Kyonggongop) in the DPR Korea League of his native country.

Due to his remarkable skills and talent the player has been called the "North Korean Ronaldo".

Despite moving to the Russian club in 2006, Choe only made his full debut for the first team on 27 June 2007, in the Russian Cup, as Krylia Sovetov lost to KAMAZ Naberezhnye Chelny, by a single goal.

Choe wasn't registered by Krylia to play in the 2009 season.

== International career ==
He was a member of his country's U-17 national team and took part in the 2005 FIFA U-17 World Championship (scoring three times in four games), as well as the 2006 AFC U-17 Championship.

== Career statistics ==
=== International ===
Appearances and goals by national team and year
National team	Year	Apps	Goals
North Korea	2008	3	0
North Korea	2010	3	2
North Korea	2011	2	0
North Korea	2012	4	0
Total		12	2

Scores and results list North Korea'a goal tally first, score column indicates score after each Choe goal.

List of international goals scored by Choe Myong-ho
No.	Date	Venue	Opponent	Score	Result	Competition
1	9 February 2010	Sugathadasa Stadium, Colombo, Sri Lanka	Kyrgyzstan	3–0	4–0	2010 AFC Challenge Cup
2	24 February 2010	Sugathadasa Stadium, Colombo, Sri Lanka	Myanmar	1–0	5–0	2010 AFC Challenge Cup

== Honours ==
=== Individual ===
- 2018 Cambodian League 'Player of the Season'
