= Phuong Soksana =

Cambodian footballer

Phuong Soksana ភួង សុខសាណា
Personal information
- Full name: Phuong Soksana
- Date of birth: March 2, 1992 (age 34)
- Place of birth: Phnom Penh, Cambodia
- Height: 1.78 m (5 ft 10 in)
- Position: Striker

Youth career
- 2005–2008: National Defense Ministry

Senior career*
Years	Team	Apps	(Gls)
2008–2023	National Defense Ministry		

International career
2012	Cambodia U-22	6	(3)
2011–2015	Cambodia U-23	9	(0)
2010–2016	Cambodia	11	(1)
- * Club domestic league appearances and goals

Phuong Soksana (born March 2, 1992, in Cambodia) is a former footballer for National Defense Ministry in the Cambodian League.

He has represented Cambodia at senior international level.

== International goals ==
#	Date	Venue	Opponent	Score	Result	Competition
1.	May 29, 2016	Phnom Penh National Olympic Stadium, Phnom Penh	Timor-Leste	1–0	2–0	Friendly

== Honours ==
=== Club ===
National Defense Ministry

- Hun Sen Cup: 2010, 2016
