= Sok Samnang =

Cambodian footballer

Sok Samnang សុខ សំណាង
Personal information
- Full name: Sok Samnang
- Date of birth: August 24, 1995 (age 31)
- Place of birth: Phnom Penh, Cambodia
- Position: Forward

Senior career*
Years	Team	Apps	(Gls)
2010–2024	Preah Khan Reach Svay Rieng		

International career
2017	Cambodia U-22	6	(1)
2016–2017	Cambodia	4	(0)
- * Club domestic league appearances and goals

Sok Samnang (born August 24, 1995, in Cambodia) is a former footballer who last played for Preah Khan Reach Svay Rieng.

== International career ==
He has represented Cambodia at senior international level. He scored his first goal for u-23 national team against Philippines on 23 July 2017 during AFC U-23 Championship qualification tournament.

== International goals ==
=== Cambodia U23 ===
No.	Date	Venue	Opponent	Score	Result	Competition
1.	23 July 2017	Phnom Penh Olympic Stadium, Phnom Penh, Cambodia	Philippines	1–0	1–0	2018 AFC U-23 Championship qualification

== Honours ==
=== Club ===
Svay Rieng

- Cambodian League: 2013
- Hun Sen Cup: 2011, 2012, 2015,2017
