= Tomoki Muramatsu =

Japanese footballer

Personal information
- Full name: Tomoki Muramatsu
- Date of birth: July 10, 1990 (age 36)
- Place of birth: Saitama, Japan
- Height: 1.68 m (5 ft 6 in)
- Position: Forward

Youth career
- 2009–2012: Hamamatsu University

Senior career*
Years	Team	Apps	(Gls)
2013–2015	Kataller Toyama	22	(1)
2014	→Honda (loan)	7	(1)
2016	Cambodian Tiger	14	(15)
2016–2017	Boeung Ket Angkor	11	(3)
2017	Mash'al Mubarek	2	(0)
- * Club domestic league appearances and goals as of 8 December 2017

Tomoki Muramatsu (村松 知輝, Muramatsu Tomoki; born July 10, 1990) is a Japanese football player. He is currently playing for FK Mash'al Mubarek in the Uzbek League.
