= Chan Dara =

Cambodian footballer

Personal information
- Full name: Chan Dara
- Date of birth: 1 March 1986 (age 40)
- Place of birth: People's Republic of Kampuchea (now Cambodia)
- Height: 1.76 m (5 ft 9 1/2 in)
- Position: Defender

Senior career*
Years	Team	Apps	(Gls)
2006–2009	Khemara Keila		
2009–2012	Phnom Penh Crown		
2012–2016	Nagaworld		
2016–2017	Asia Euro United		
2017–2018	Electricite du Cambodge		

International career
2007	Cambodia	5	(0)
- * Club domestic league appearances and goals

Chan Dara (Khmer: ចាន់ ដារ៉ា [can ɗaːraː]; born 1 March 1986) is a former Cambodian footballer.

== Honours ==
=== Club ===
Khemara Keila

- Cambodian League: 2006
- Hun Sen Cup: 2007

Phnom Penh Crown

- Cambodian League: 2010, 2011

Nagaworld

- Hun Sen Cup: 2013
