= Anthony Aymard =

French footballer (born 1988)

Personal information
- Full name: Anthony Aymard
- Date of birth: 11 May 1988 (age 38)
- Place of birth: Le Puy-en-Velay, France
- Height: 1.81 m (5 ft 11 1/2 in)
- Position: Defender

Senior career*
Years	Team	Apps	(Gls)
2011	Etoile	26	(0)
2012–2015	Tanjong Pagar United	45	(2)
2015–2017	Phnom Penh Crown	25	(3)
- * Club domestic league appearances and goals as of 21 November 2011

Anthony Aymard (born 11 May 1988) is a French footballer who plays as a defender.

== Career ==
Aymard was signed onto the 2011 S.League squad for Etoile FC, and made his debut in the starting 11 on the opening matchday against Geylang United in which Etoile FC ran out 2-0 winners. On 1 July 2012 he signed for the club of Tanjong Pagar United FC. On 18 November 2012 he scored his first goal in S-League against Home United on a direct free kick from 50 meters. On 19 January 2016, he signed a two-year contract with six times Cambodian champions, Phnom Penh Crown.
