= Sor Piseth =

Cambodian footballer

Personal information
- Full name: Sor Piseth
- Date of birth: August 8, 1992 (age 34)
- Place of birth: Cambodia
- Position: Defender

Senior career*
| Years | Team | Apps | (Gls) |
- Build Bright United
| 2015–2024 | Tiffy Army | | |

International career^{‡}
| 2017–2018 | Cambodia | 6 | (0) |
- * Club domestic league appearances and goals ‡ National team caps and goals as of 26 April 2024

Sor Piseth (born 8 August 1992) is a Cambodian footballer who plays as a defender. He was selected for the Cambodia national football team in 2010s.
