= Reung Bunheing =

Cambodian footballer

Personal information
- Full name: Reung Bunheing
- Date of birth: September 25, 1992 (age 34)
- Place of birth: Phnom Penh, Cambodia
- Height: 1.78 m (5 ft 10 in)
- Position: Forward

Senior career*
Years	Team	Apps	(Gls)
–2015	Build Bright United		
2015–2019	National Defense Ministry		
2020–2024	Visakha	35	(13)
2023–2024	Visakha B	6	(0)

International career^{‡}
2012–2023	Cambodia	19	(5)
- * Club domestic league appearances and goals as of 21 October 2018 ‡ National team caps and goals as of 18 October 2023

Reung Bunheing (born September 25, 1992) is a retired Cambodian professional footballer who last played as a forward for Cambodian Premier League club Visakha and the Cambodia national team.

== International career ==
=== International goals ===
Scores and results list Cambodia's goal tally first.

#	Date	Venue	Opponent	Score	Result	Competition
1.	12 October 2018	Phnom Penh National Olympic Stadium, Phnom Penh, Cambodia	Timor-Leste	2–2	2–2	Friendly
2.	11 June 2019	Hamad bin Khalifa Stadium, Doha, Qatar	Pakistan	2–1	2–1	2022 FIFA World Cup Qualification
3.	20 December 2022	Morodok Techo National Stadium, Phnom Penh, Cambodia	Philippines	1–0	3–2	2022 AFF Championship
4.	20 December 2022	Morodok Techo National Stadium, Phnom Penh, Cambodia	Philippines	3–2	3–2	2022 AFF Championship
5.	11 September 2023	Phnom Penh National Olympic Stadium, Phnom Penh, Cambodia	Macau	4–0	4–0	Friendly

== Honours ==
=== Club ===
National Defense Ministry

- Hun Sen Cup: 2016, 2018
