= Sok Sovan =

Cambodian footballer (born 1992)

Sok Sovan សុខ សុវណ្ណ
Personal information
- Full name: Sok Sovan
- Date of birth: April 5, 1992 (age 34)
- Place of birth: Phnom Penh, Cambodia
- Height: 1.75 m (5 ft 9 in)
- Position: Defender

Senior career*
Years	Team	Apps	(Gls)
2007–2013	Phnom Penh Crown		
2013–2018	Boeung Ket		
2018–2019	Visakha		
2019	→ Phnom Penh Crown (loan)	13	(0)
2020	Phnom Penh Crown	0	(0)

International career^{‡}
2012–2015	Cambodia U-23	5	(0)
2013–2017	Cambodia	31	(0)
- * Club domestic league appearances and goals ‡ National team caps and goals as of 20 August 2015

Sok Sovan (Khmer: សុខ សុវណ្ណ born 5 April 1992) is a former Cambodian footballer who last played as a defender for Phnom Penh Crown and the Cambodia national football team. He made his debut in 2013 in a friendly against Guam.

== Honours ==
=== Club ===
Phnom Penh Crown

- Cambodian League: 2010, 2011
- Hun Sen Cup: 208, 2009
- 2011 AFC President's Cup: Runner up

Boeung Ket Angkor

- Cambodian League: 2016;2017
- 2015 Mekong Club Championship: Runner up
