= Say Piseth =

Cambodian footballer

Say Piseth សាយ ពិសិដ្ឋ
Personal information
- Date of birth: 4 August 1990 (age 36)
- Place of birth: Kandal, Cambodia
- Position: Defender

Youth career
- 2005–2007: Phnom Penh Empire

Senior career*
Years	Team	Apps	(Gls)
2008–2010	Chhlam Samuth		
2010	→ Wat Phnom (loan)		
2010	→ National Police Commissary (loan)		
2010–2023	National Police Commissary		

International career
2013	Cambodia U-23		
2011–2016	Cambodia	20	(0)

Managerial career
- 2023–: National Police Commissary (Assistant coach)
- * Club domestic league appearances and goals

Say Piseth (born 4 August 1990) is a former Cambodian footballer who last played for home town club National Police Commissary in Cambodian League 2.

He represented Cambodia at senior international level.
