= Western Stadium =

Stadium in Phnom Penh, Cambodia

- AIA Stadium
- Interactive map of Western Stadium
- Full name: Western Stadium
- Location: Phnom Penh, Cambodia
- Coordinates: 11.581278°N 104.883824°E
- Capacity: 1000
- Surface: Artificial Grass

Construction
- Opened: 2015
- Closed: 2022
- Demolished: 2022

Western Stadium (Khmer: កីឡដ្ឋានវេស្ទើន, UNGEGN: Keilâdthan Vésteun) was the home stadium of Cambodian League club Western University FC. It has capacity of 1000. This stadium was broke ground in 2014 and opened in 2015. It located in the Tuol Kouk District of Phnom Penh, Cambodia. The stadium was demolished in early October 2022.

== See also ==
- 2016 Cambodian League
