= Prak Mony Udom =

Cambodian footballer (born 1994)

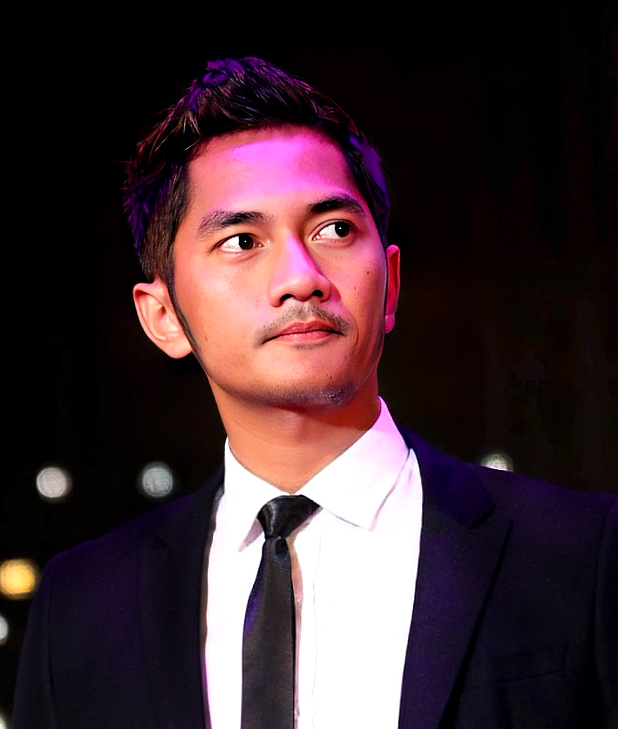
- Prak Mony Udom, at the First Cambodia Football Award in 2018 at Koh Pich

Personal information
- Date of birth: 20 March 1994 (age 32)
- Place of birth: Phnom Penh, Cambodia
- Height: 1.73 m (5 ft 8 in)
- Positions: Forward; winger

Youth career
- 2004–2009: Preah Khan Reach

Senior career*
Years	Team	Apps	(Gls)
2010–2017	Preah Khan Reach		
2018	Negeri Sembilan	5	(0)
2018–2026	Preah Khan Reach		

International career
2009–2011	Cambodia U19	7	(3)
2015	Cambodia U22	5	(2)
2011–2015	Cambodia U23	17	(3)
2011–	Cambodia	58	(11)
- * Club domestic league appearances and goals

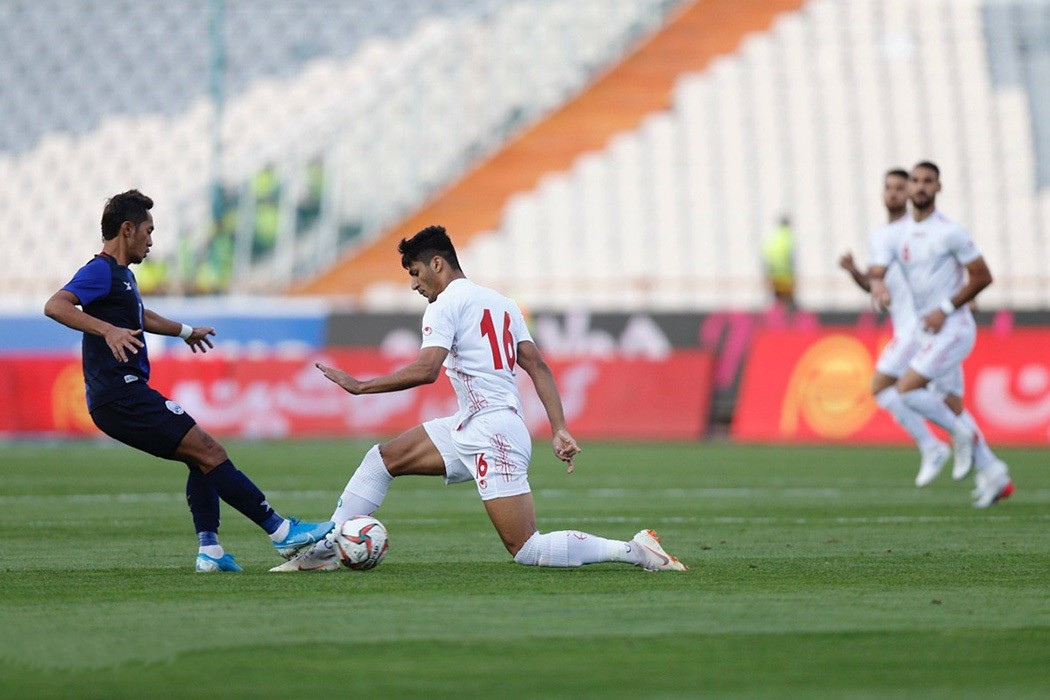
Prak Mony Udom in Iran vs Cambodia

Prak Mony Udom (Khmer: ប្រាក់ មុន្នីឧត្តម, born 20 March 1994) is a Cambodian professional footballer who plays as a forward or winger. He is a member of the Cambodia national football team.

== International goals ==
As of match played 20 November 2018. Cambodia score listed first, score column indicates score after each Prak Mony goal.

International goals by date, venue, cap, opponent, score, result and competition
No.	Date	Venue	Cap	Opponent	Score	Result	Competition
1	9 October 2012	Thuwunna Stadium, Yangon, Myanmar	8	Brunei	1–0	2–3	2012 AFF Championship qualification
2	3 November 2015	Olympic Stadium, Phnom Penh, Cambodia	25	Brunei	1–1	6–1	Friendly
3	3 November 2015	Olympic Stadium, Phnom Penh, Cambodia	25	Brunei	3–1	6–1	Friendly
4	7 June 2016	Olympic Stadium, Phnom Penh, Cambodia	29	Chinese Taipei	2–0	2–0	2019 AFC Asian Cup qualification
5	15 October 2016	Olympic Stadium, Phnom Penh, Cambodia	34	Laos	1–0	2–1	2016 AFF Championship qualification
6	18 October 2016	Olympic Stadium, Phnom Penh, Cambodia	35	Brunei	1–0	3–0	2016 AFF Championship qualification
7	18 October 2016	Olympic Stadium, Phnom Penh, Cambodia	35	Brunei	3–0	3–0	2016 AFF Championship qualification
8	13 June 2017	Olympic Stadium, Phnom Penh, Cambodia	44	Afghanistan	1–0	1–0	2019 AFC Asian Cup qualification
9	9 November 2017	Olympic Stadium, Phnom Penh, Cambodia	46	Myanmar	1–1	1–2	Friendly
10	9 November 2017	Olympic Stadium, Phnom Penh, Cambodia	52	Laos	2–0	3–1	2018 AFF Championship
11	9 December 2021	Bishan Stadium, Bishan, Singapore	59	Indonesia	2–4	2–4	2020 AFF Championship

== Honours ==
Svay Rieng

- Cambodian League: 2013
- Hun Sen Cup: 2011, 2012, 2015, 2017

Individual

- Hun Sen Cup Golden Boot: 2015
- FFC Best Player of The Year: 2017
