= RCAF Old Stadium =

Sports venue in Phnom Penh, Cambodia

Coordinates: 11°35′11″N 104°54′54″E

- Old Stadium
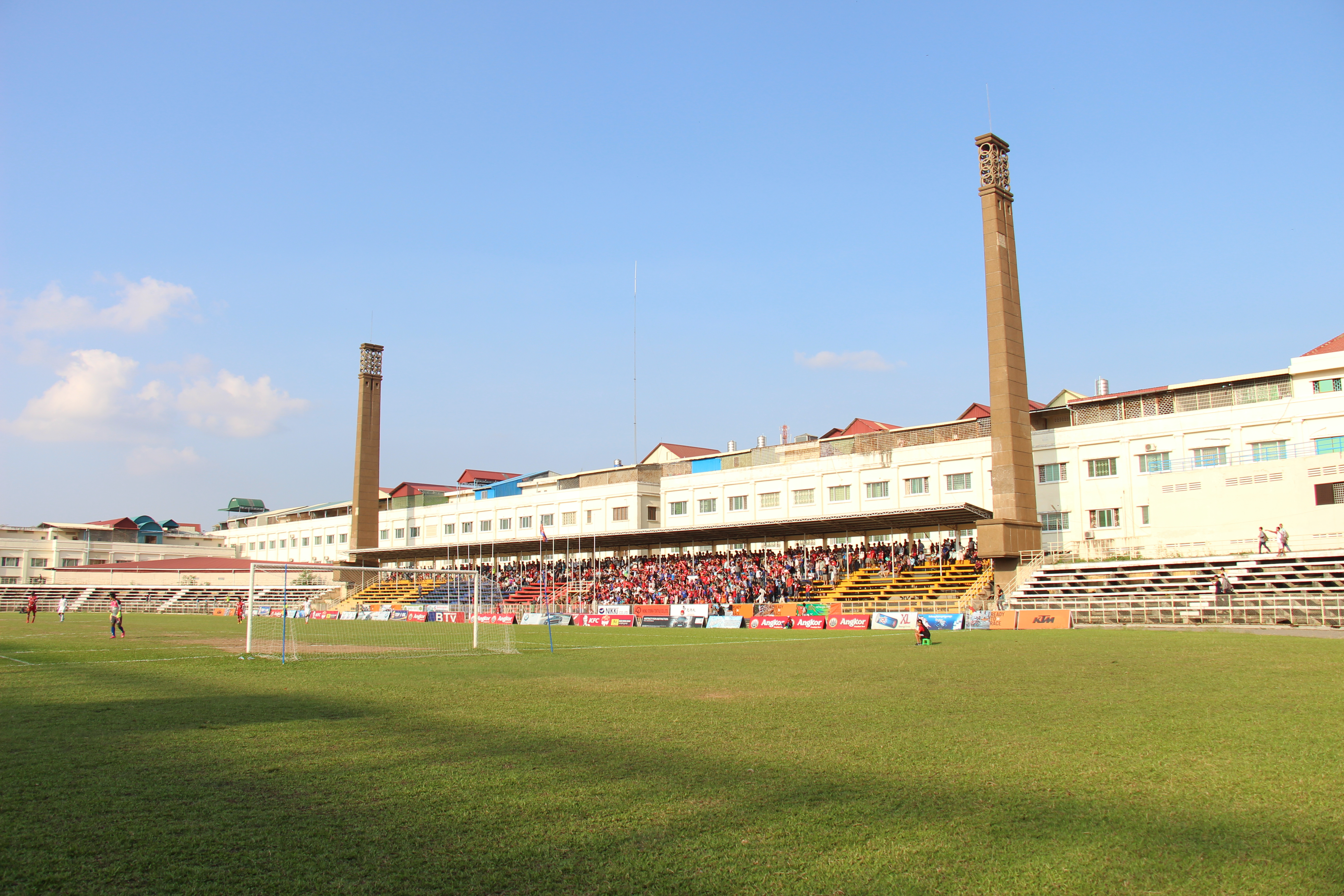
- Interactive map of RCAF Old Stadium
- Full name: RCAF Old Stadium
- Location: Phnom Penh, Cambodia
- Owner: Royal Cambodian Armed Forces Sport Center
- Capacity: 8,000
- Surface: Grass

Construction
- Built: 1920s
- Opened: 1920s
- Renovated: 2024

Tenant
- Royal Cambodian Armed Forces (1983–present)

RCAF Stadium (Royal Cambodia Armed Forces Stadium), also known as the Old Stadium or Lambert Stadium, is a stadium in Phnom Penh, Cambodia. It has a capacity of 8,000 spectators. It is the home stadium of Royal Cambodian Armed Forces FC of the Cambodian League. The stadium also hosts matches of the Cambodia national football team.
