= Svay Rieng Stadium =

Cambodian stadium

Coordinates: 11.082328°N 105.802856°E

Svay Rieng Stadium កីឡដ្ឋាន ខេត្តស្វាយរៀង
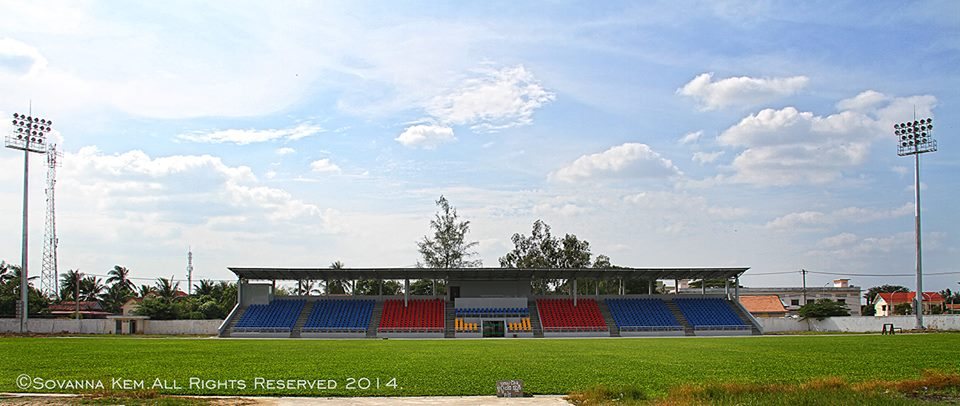
- Interactive map of Svay Rieng Stadium កីឡដ្ឋាន ខេត្តស្វាយរៀង
- Location: Svay Rieng Province, Cambodia
- Owner: Svay Rieng Football Club
- Capacity: 7,500
- Surface: Grass

Construction
- Opened: 2015
- Renovated: 2025

Tenants
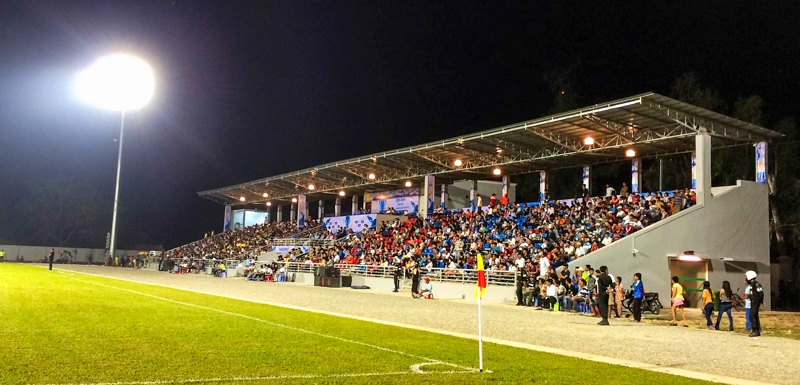
- Preah Khan Reach Svay Rieng (2015–present)

Svay Rieng Stadium កីឡដ្ឋាន ខេត្តស្វាយរៀង is a football stadium in Svay Rieng Province, Cambodia. It has a capacity of 6,000 spectators. It is the home of Preah Khan Reach Svay Rieng of the Cambodian Premier League.

== International matches ==
Date	Team #1	Score	Team #2	Match
28 February 2015	Cambodia	3–0	Singapore U22	Friendly
