= Western Phnom Penh FC =

Cambodian football club

- Full name: Western Phnom Penh Football Club
- Founded: 2010
- Ground: Western Stadium
- Capacity: 1,000
- Chairman: Te Lorent
- Manager: Bouy MengHong
- Coach: Fisol Lasak
- League: Cambodian League
- 2018: 12th (Relegated)
- Website: http://www.westernsportforall.com/public/
Home colours	Away colours

Western Phnom Penh Football Club, formerly known as Western Uni. before January 2015 and Sparta Phnom Penh, and Western Phnom Penh FC during 2015, is a football (soccer) club based in Cambodia. The team competes in the Cambodian League, which is the top division of Cambodian football.

== Current squad ==
Note: Flags indicate national team as defined under FIFA eligibility rules; some limited exceptions apply. Players may hold more than one non-FIFA nationality.

No.	Pos.	Nation	Player
1	GK	CAM	Ly Someth
3	DF	IDN	Tenius Trukna
4	DF	NGR	Igwe Chukwu Thankgod
8	MF	CAM	Nuth Pitou
9	FW	CAM	Chantha Thonthean
13	GK	CAM	Nhem Slayman
15	DF	CAM	Ker Mizan
16	MF	CAM	Tep Chanvirak
17	MF	CAM	Mao Rithy

No.	Pos.	Nation	Player
22	DF	CAM	Hem Sreng
24	MF	CAM	Soeung Sopanha
28	MF	CAM	Men Monira
29	MF	IDN	Faisal Rizal Samberbori
30	DF	CAM	Kroch Mol
32	DF	CAM	Tin Kano
45	MF	CAM	Chan Phearu
63	MF	CAM	Um Tola
95	FW	IDN	Yuspen Uopdana
99	MF	CAM	Chan Sophea
