= 2026 ASEAN Championship Group A =

ASEAN Championship group

Group A of the 2026 ASEAN Championship took place from 24 July to 7 August 2026. The group consisted of defending champions Vietnam, Singapore, Indonesia, Cambodia, and Timor-Leste.

The top two teams, Vietnam and Singapore, secured their place in the semi-finals. Vietnam topped the group with three victories and a draw. Singapore would advance as runners-up, with two wins and two draws. Indonesia finished third, Cambodia finished fourth, having won one match, while Timor-Leste finished fifth without registering a single point.

== Teams ==
| Draw position | Team | Pot | Appearance | Previous best performance | FIFA Ranking | |
| Draw position | Team | Pot | Appearance | Previous best performance | December 2025 | July 2026 |
|---|---|---|---|---|---|---|
| A1 | Vietnam | 1 | 16th | Winners (2008, 2018, 2024) | 107 | 99 |
| A2 | Singapore | 2 | 15th | Winners (1998, 2004, 2007, 2012) | 148 | 148 |
| A3 | Indonesia | 3 | 16th | Runners-up (2000, 2002, 2004, 2010, 2016, 2020) | 122 | 118 |
| A4 | Cambodia | 4 | 11th | Group stage (All appearances) | 179 | 175 |
| A5 | Timor-Leste (Note: As the identity of the qualification winner was not known at the time of the final draw, positions in the last two tournament rankings were not taken into account, and the placeholder in the draw was automatically seeded into Pot 5.) | 5 | 5th | Group stage (All appearances) | 198 | 201 |

== Standings ==
| Pos | Team | Pld | W | D | L | GF | GA | GD | Pts | Qualification |
|---|---|---|---|---|---|---|---|---|---|---|
| 1 | Vietnam | 4 | 3 | 1 | 0 | 13 | 1 | +12 | 10 | Advance to knockout stage |
| 2 | Singapore | 4 | 2 | 2 | 0 | 5 | 2 | +3 | 8 | Advance to knockout stage |
| 3 | Indonesia | 4 | 2 | 1 | 1 | 9 | 5 | +4 | 7 | |
| 4 | Cambodia | 4 | 1 | 0 | 3 | 6 | 10 | −4 | 3 | |
| 5 | Timor-Leste | 4 | 0 | 0 | 4 | 0 | 15 | −15 | 0 | |

Source: ASEAN United
Rules for classification: Group stage tiebreakers

In the semi-finals:

- The winner of Group A, Vietnam, advanced to play the runner-up of Group B, Malaysia.
- The runner-up of Group A, Singapore, advanced to play the winner of Group B, Thailand.

== Matches ==
All times listed are local.

=== Cambodia vs Singapore ===
24 July 2026
19:00 UTC+7

| Cambodia | 1–2 | Singapore |
|---|---|---|
| Sovann 55' | Report | Shawal 22'; Ilhan 90+11' |

Morodok Techo National Stadium, Phnom Penh
Attendance: 27,790
Referee: Koji Takasaki (Japan)

| Cambodia | Singapore |

| GK | 22 | Hul Kimhuy (c) |
| RB | 18 | Ouk Sovann |
| CB | 5 | Hikaru Mizuno |
| CB | 3 | Sophal Dimong | | (substituted off) 46' |
| LB | 19 | Phat Sokha | | (substituted off) 71' |
| RM | 10 | Mat Noron | | (substituted off) 46' |
| CM | 4 | Alisher Mirzaev |
| CM | 6 | Yudai Ogawa | (yellow card) 19' |
| LM | 7 | Iago Bento | | (substituted off) 46' |
| CF | 20 | Abdel Kader Coulibaly | | (substituted off) 67' |
| CF | 8 | Bong Samuel |
Substitutions:
| FW | 16 | Yem Devit | | (substituted on) 46' |
| FW | 9 | Sieng Chanthea | | (substituted on) 46' |
| FW | 17 | Sa Ty | | (substituted on) 46' |
| FW | 11 | Mon Rado | | (substituted on) 67' |
| DF | 26 | Chea Sokmeng | | (substituted on) 71' |
Manager:
(Japan) Koji Gyotoku

| GK | 1 | Izwan Mahbud |
| RB | 15 | Lionel Tan | | (substituted off) 75' |
| CB | 14 | Hariss Harun (c) |
| CB | 17 | Irfan Fandi |
| LB | 3 | Ryhan Stewart | | (substituted off) 62' |
| RM | 11 | Glenn Kweh | | (substituted off) 58' |
| CM | 8 | Shah Shahiran | (yellow card) 34' |
| CM | 6 | Kyoga Nakamura |
| LM | 13 | Harhys Stewart |
| AM | 16 | Hami Syahin | | (substituted off) 46' |
| CF | 20 | Shawal Anuar | | (substituted off) 57' |
Substitutions:
| MF | 7 | Song Ui-young | | (substituted on) 46' |
| FW | 19 | Ilhan Fandi | | (substituted on) 57' |
| FW | 10 | Farhan Zulkifli | | (substituted on) 58' |
| DF | 25 | Nur Adam Abdullah | | (substituted on) 62' |
| MF | 18 | Jacob Mahler | | (substituted on) 75' |
Manager:
Gavin Lee

Hyundai Player of the Match:
Ilhan Fandi (Singapore)

Assistant referees:
Masaru Hasegawa (Japan)
Zainal Abidin (Malaysia)
Fourth official:
Izzul Fikri Kamaruzaman (Malaysia)
Video assistant referee:
Mongkolchai Pechsri (Thailand)
Assistant video assistant referee:
Sivakorn Pu-udom (Thailand)

=== Timor-Leste vs Vietnam ===
24 July 2026
20:30 UTC+7

| Timor-Leste | 0–7 | Vietnam |
|---|---|---|
| | Report | Đỗ Hoàng Hên 7', 41'; Nguyễn Đình Bắc 31', 42', 65'; Nguyễn Xuân Son 45+1'; Nguyễn Quang Hải 79' |

Chonburi Stadium, Chonburi (Thailand)
Attendance: 195
Referee: Jin Jingyuan (China)

| Timor-Leste | Vietnam |

| GK | 1 | Dylan Niski |
| CB | 3 | Eric Tam Silva | (yellow card) 68' | (substituted off) 76' |
| CB | 4 | Anizo Correia |
| CB | 6 | João Varudo | | (substituted off) 46' |
| RWB | 7 | Luís Figo |
| LWB | 16 | Ryan Jom | | (substituted off) 68' |
| CM | 11 | Zenivio (c) | | (substituted off) 46' |
| CM | 8 | Claudio Osorio |
| CM | 23 | Oatnasio |
| CF | 9 | João Rangel |
| CF | 14 | Zion Cruz | | (substituted off) 60' |
Substitutions:
| MF | 13 | Tristan Arrarte | | (substituted on) 46' |
| DF | 17 | Liam Farrugia | | (substituted on) 46' |
| FW | 19 | Alexandro Bakhito | | (substituted on) 60' |
| DF | 2 | Jackson Fowler | | (substituted on) 68' |
| DF | 5 | Juvito Moniz | | (substituted on) 76' |
Manager:
(Portugal) Zé Pedro

| GK | 1 | Lê Giang Patrik |
| CB | 7 | Phạm Xuân Mạnh | (substituted off) 76' |
| CB | 16 | Nguyễn Thành Chung | (substituted off) 63' |
| CB | 5 | Đoàn Văn Hậu |
| RM | 15 | Trương Tiến Anh | (substituted off) 63' |
| CM | 19 | Nguyễn Quang Hải (c) |
| CM | 14 | Nguyễn Hoàng Đức |
| LM | 3 | Nguyễn Văn Vĩ | (substituted off) 63' |
| RF | 10 | Đỗ Hoàng Hên | (substituted off) 86' |
| CF | 12 | Nguyễn Xuân Son |
| LF | 9 | Nguyễn Đình Bắc |
Substitutions:
| DF | 24 | Phan Tuấn Tài | (substituted on) 63' |
| DF | 20 | Bùi Hoàng Việt Anh | (substituted on) 63' |
| MF | 26 | Lê Văn Đô | (substituted on) 63' |
| MF | 18 | Nguyễn Hai Long | (substituted on) 76' |
| FW | 22 | Nguyễn Trần Việt Cường | (substituted on) 86' |
Manager:
(South Korea) Kim Sang-sik

Hyundai Player of the Match:
Nguyễn Đình Bắc (Vietnam)

Assistant referees:
Tang Chao (China)
Apichit Nophuan (Thailand)
Fourth official:
Wiwat Jumpao-on (Thailand)
Video assistant referee:
Muhammad Taqi (Singapore)
Assistant video assistant referee:
Kitisak Pikunngoen (Thailand)

=== Singapore vs Timor-Leste ===
27 July 2026
19:00 UTC+8

| Singapore | 2–0 | Timor-Leste |
|---|---|---|
| Ilhan 41'; Song Ui-young 56' | Report |

Jalan Besar Stadium, Kallang
Attendance: 4,665
Referee: Salman Falahi (Qatar)

| Singapore | Timor-Leste |

| GK | 1 | Izwan Mahbud |
| RB | 15 | Lionel Tan |
| CB | 14 | Hariss Harun (c) | (yellow card) 18' |
| CB | 17 | Irfan Fandi | | (substituted off) 66' |
| LB | 26 | Nur Adam Abdullah | | (substituted off) 83' |
| CM | 8 | Shah Shahiran |
| CM | 6 | Kyoga Nakamura | (yellow card) 3' |
| RW | 11 | Glenn Kweh | | (substituted off) 73' |
| AM | 7 | Song Ui-young | (yellow card) 60' | (substituted off) 66' |
| LW | 13 | Harhys Stewart |
| CF | 19 | Ilhan Fandi | | (substituted off) 73' |
Substitutions:
| FW | 20 | Shawal Anuar | | (substituted on) 66' |
| DF | 18 | Jacob Mahler | | (substituted on) 66' |
| FW | 22 | Joel Chew | | (substituted on) 73' |
| MF | 10 | Farhan Zulkifli | | (substituted on) 73' |
| DF | 5 | Amirul Adli | | (substituted on) 83' |
Manager:
Gavin Lee

| GK | 1 | Dylan Niski |
| CB | 2 | Jackson Fowler |
| CB | 3 | Eric Silva | (yellow card) 20' |
| CB | 16 | Ryan Jom |
| RWB | 7 | Luís Figo | | (substituted off) 52' |
| LWB | 17 | Liam Farrugia |
| RM | 11 | Zenivio (c) | | (substituted off) 63' |
| CM | 13 | Tristan Arrarte | | (substituted off) 62' |
| CM | 8 | Claudio Osorio |
| LM | 9 | João Rangel | | (substituted off) 68' |
| CF | 14 | Zion Cruz | | (substituted off) 68' |
Substitutions:
| FW | 18 | Olagar Xavier | | (substituted on) 52' |
| MF | 15 | Palomito Ribeiro | (yellow card) 84' | (substituted on) 62' |
| MF | 21 | Vabio Canavaro | | (substituted on) 63' |
| FW | 19 | Alexandro Bakhito | | (substituted on) 68' |
| DF | 23 | Oatnasio | | (substituted on) 68' |
Manager:
(Portugal) Zé Pedro

Hyundai Player of the Match:
Ilhan Fandi (Singapore)

Assistant referees:
Zahy Snaid Al Shammari (Qatar)
Pattarapong Kijsathit (Thailand)
Fourth official:
Wiwat Jumpao-on (Thailand)
Video assistant referee:
Sivakorn Pu-udom (Thailand)
Assistant video assistant referee:
Mongkolchai Pechsri (Thailand)

=== Indonesia vs Cambodia ===
27 July 2026
20:30 UTC+7

| Indonesia | 5–1 | Cambodia |
|---|---|---|
| Baker 6', 15', 56'; Walsh 24'; Raven 86' | Report | Sokmeng 48' |

Pakansari Stadium, Bogor
Attendance: 22,485
Referee: Kim Woo-sung (South Korea)

| Indonesia | Cambodia |

| GK | 1 | Nadeo Argawinata |
| CB | 6 | Sandy Walsh | (yellow card) 60' |
| CB | 5 | Rizky Ridho (c) |
| CB | 20 | Shayne Pattynama | | (substituted off) 69' |
| RM | 14 | Eliano Reijnders |
| CM | 18 | Ivar Jenner | | (substituted off) 46' |
| CM | 23 | Marc Klok | | (substituted off) 46' |
| LM | 16 | Dony Tri Pamungkas |
| RF | 13 | Beckham Putra | | (substituted off) 58' |
| CF | 9 | Mitchell Baker | | (substituted off) 58' |
| LF | 19 | Thom Haye |
Substitutions:
| MF | 10 | Egy Maulana Vikri | | (substituted on) 46' |
| MF | 8 | Kadek Agung | | (substituted on) 46' |
| FW | 15 | Saddil Ramdani | | (substituted on) 58' |
| FW | 24 | Jens Raven | | (substituted on) 58' |
| DF | 2 | Brian Fatari | | (substituted on) 69' |
Manager:
(England) John Herdman

| GK | 22 | Hul Kimhuy (c) |
| RB | 18 | Ouk Sovann |
| CB | 5 | Hikaru Mizuno |
| CB | 4 | Alisher Mirzaev | | (substituted off) 46' |
| LB | 26 | Chea Sokmeng |
| RM | 17 | Sa Ty | | (substituted off) 63' |
| CM | 12 | Sos Suhana | | (substituted off) 63' |
| CM | 6 | Yudai Ogawa | (yellow card) 5' |
| LM | 16 | Yem Devit | | (substituted off) 46' |
| CF | 8 | Bong Samuel |
| CF | 9 | Sieng Chanthea | | (substituted off) 81' |
Substitutions:
| MF | 15 | Tum Makara | | (substituted on) 46' |
| DF | 24 | Im Vakhim | | (substituted on) 46' |
| MF | 23 | Sin Sovannmakara | | (substituted on) 63' |
| FW | 11 | Mon Rado | | (substituted on) 63' |
| FW | 25 | Mon Vanda | | (substituted on) 81' |
Manager:
(Japan) Koji Gyotoku

Hyundai Player of the Match:
Mitchell Baker (Indonesia)

Assistant referee:
Park Sang-jun (South Korea)
Muhammad Farhan (Malaysia)
Fourth official:
Tuan Mohd Yaasin bin Tuan Mohd Hanafiah (Malaysia)
Video assistant referee:
Muhammad Taqi (Singapore)
Assistant video assistant referee:
Pansa Chaisanit (Thailand)

=== Timor-Leste vs Indonesia ===
31 July 2026
17:00 UTC+7

| Timor-Leste | 0–3 | Indonesia |
|---|---|---|
| | Report | Pattynama 74'; Haye 78'; Baker 81' |

Chonburi Stadium, Chonburi (Thailand)
Attendance: 189
Referee: Choi Hyun-jai (South Korea)

| Timor-Leste | Indonesia |

| GK | 1 | Dylan Niski |
| CB | 2 | Jackson Fowler | (yellow card) 14' (yellow-red card) 21' |
| CB | 6 | João Varudo |
| CB | 16 | Ryan Jom |
| RWB | 18 | Olagar Xavier | | (substituted off) 77' |
| LWB | 17 | Liam Farrugia | (yellow card) 76' |
| RM | 9 | João Rangel |
| CM | 8 | Claudio Osorio | | (substituted off) 77' |
| CM | 13 | Tristan Arrarte | | (substituted off) 69' |
| LM | 11 | Zenivio (c) | | (substituted off) 82' |
| CF | 14 | Zion Cruz | | (substituted off) 69' |
Substitutions:
| FW | 19 | Alexandro Bakhito | | (substituted on) 69' |
| FW | 23 | Oatnasio | | (substituted on) 69' |
| FW | 7 | Luís Figo | | (substituted on) 77' |
| MF | 15 | Palomito Ribeiro | | (substituted on) 77' |
| FW | 21 | Angenucu Viegas | | (substituted on) 82' |
Manager:
(Portugal) Zé Pedro

| GK | 12 | Cahya Supriadi |
| CB | 3 | Wahyu Prasetyo | | (substituted off) 54' |
| CB | 4 | Jordi Amat (c) |
| CB | 2 | Brian Fatari | | (substituted off) 54' |
| RWB | 14 | Eliano Reijnders | (yellow card) 69' |
| LWB | 26 | Tim Geypens | | (substituted off) 66' |
| RM | 21 | Rayhan Hannan | (yellow card) 3' | (substituted off) 46' |
| CM | 23 | Marc Klok | | (substituted off) 66' |
| CM | 18 | Ivar Jenner |
| LM | 19 | Thom Haye |
| CF | 9 | Mitchell Baker |
Substitutions:
| FW | 10 | Egy Maulana Vikri | | (substituted on) 46' |
| DF | 20 | Shayne Pattynama | | (substituted on) 54' |
| DF | 6 | Sandy Walsh | | (substituted on) 54' |
| FW | 11 | Ragnar Oratmangoen | (yellow card) 79' | (substituted on) 66' |
| DF | 16 | Dony Tri Pamungkas | | (substituted on) 66' |
Manager:
(England) John Herdman

Hyundai Player of the Match:
Shayne Pattynama (Indonesia)

Assistant referees:
Jang Jong-pil (South Korea)
Abdul Hannan bin Abdul Hasim (Singapore)
Fourth official:
Muhammad Izzul Fikri bin Kamaruzaman (Malaysia)
Video assistant referee:
Muhammad Taqi (Singapore)
Assistant video assistant referee:
Farhad bin Mohamed (Singapore)

=== Vietnam vs Singapore ===
31 July 2026
20:00 UTC+7

| Vietnam | 0–0 | Singapore |
|---|---|---|
| | Report |

Mỹ Đình National Stadium, Hanoi
Attendance: 31,569
Referee: Hiroki Kasahara (Japan)

| Vietnam | Singapore |

| GK | 1 | Lê Giang Patrik |
| CB | 7 | Phạm Xuân Mạnh | (yellow card) 28' |
| CB | 16 | Nguyễn Thành Chung |
| CB | 5 | Đoàn Văn Hậu | | (substituted off) 90+3' |
| RWB | 15 | Trương Tiến Anh |
| LWB | 3 | Nguyễn Văn Vĩ | | (substituted off) 72' |
| RM | 10 | Đỗ Hoàng Hên | | (substituted off) 72' |
| CM | 19 | Nguyễn Quang Hải (c) | | (substituted off) 90+3' |
| CM | 14 | Nguyễn Hoàng Đức |
| LM | 9 | Nguyễn Đình Bắc | | (substituted off) 41' |
| CF | 12 | Nguyễn Xuân Son |
Substitutions:
| FW | 13 | Nguyễn Tài Lộc | | (substituted on) 41' |
| DF | 24 | Phan Tuấn Tài | | (substituted on) 72' |
| MF | 18 | Nguyễn Hai Long | | (substituted on) 72' |
| MF | 8 | Lê Phạm Thành Long | | (substituted on) 90+3' |
| FW | 22 | Nguyễn Trần Việt Cường | | (substituted on) 90+3' |
Manager:
(South Korea) Kim Sang-sik

| GK | 1 | Izwan Mahbud |
| RB | 15 | Lionel Tan |
| CB | 14 | Hariss Harun (c) |
| CB | 18 | Jacob Mahler |
| LB | 3 | Ryhan Stewart | | (substituted off) 65' |
| CM | 6 | Kyoga Nakamura | (yellow card) 15' |
| CM | 8 | Shah Shahiran |
| RM | 11 | Glenn Kweh | | (substituted off) 65' |
| AM | 13 | Harhys Stewart | | (substituted off) 89' |
| LM | 7 | Song Ui-young | | (substituted off) 59' |
| CF | 20 | Shawal Anuar | | (substituted off) 89' |
Substitutions:
| FW | 19 | Ilhan Fandi | | (substituted on) 59' |
| DF | 26 | Nur Adam Abdullah | | (substituted on) 65' |
| MF | 16 | Hami Syahin | | (substituted on) 65' |
| MF | 10 | Farhan Zulkifli | | (substituted on) 89' |
| DF | 17 | Irfan Fandi | | (substituted on) 89' |
Manager:
Gavin Lee

Hyundai Player of the Match:
Hariss Harun (Singapore)

Assistant referees:
Satoshi Michiyama (Japan)
Rawut Nakarit (Thailand)
Fourth official:
Wiwat Jumpao-on (Thailand)
Video assistant referee:
Sivakorn Pu-udom (Thailand)
Assistant video assistant referee:
Pansa Chaisanit (Thailand)

=== Cambodia vs Timor-Leste ===
3 August 2026
17:30 UTC+7

| Cambodia | 3–0 | Timor-Leste |
|---|---|---|
| Soknet 16', 63'; Rado 90' | Report |

Morodok Techo National Stadium, Phnom Penh
Attendance: 6,548
Referee: Zakaria Ismail (Malaysia)

| Cambodia | Timor-Leste |

| GK | 22 | Hul Kimhuy (c) |
| RB | 18 | Ouk Sovann |
| CB | 5 | Hikaru Mizuno |
| CB | 24 | Im Vakhim | (yellow card) 38' |
| LB | 19 | Phat Sokha | | (substituted off) 89' |
| RM | 17 | Sa Ty | | (substituted off) 57' |
| CM | 8 | Bong Samuel |
| CM | 4 | Alisher Mirzaev |
| LM | 7 | Iago Bento | | (substituted off) 80' |
| CF | 16 | Yem Devit | | (substituted off) 46' |
| CF | 14 | Hav Soknet | | (substituted off) 89' |
Substitutions:
| FW | 11 | Mon Rado | | (substituted on) 46' |
| FW | 25 | Mon Vanda | | (substituted on) 57' |
| DF | 15 | Tum Makara | | (substituted on) 80' |
| DF | 26 | Chea Sokmeng | | (substituted on) 89' |
| DF | 3 | Sophal Dimong | | (substituted on) 89' |
Manager
(Japan) Koji Gyotoku

| GK | 1 | Dylan Niski |
| CB | 3 | Eric Silva |
| CB | 6 | João Varudo | | (substituted off) 68' |
| CB | 16 | Ryan Jom | (yellow card) 81' |
| RWB | 18 | Olagar Xavier | | (substituted off) 58' |
| LWB | 17 | Liam Farrugia | | (substituted off) 77' |
| RM | 9 | João Rangel |
| CM | 13 | Tristan Arrarte | | (substituted off) 77' |
| CM | 8 | Claudio Osorio |
| LM | 11 | Zenivio (c) |
| CF | 14 | Zion Cruz | | (substituted off) 68' |
Substitutions:
| FW | 22 | Vabio Canavaro | | (substituted on) 58' |
| FW | 19 | Alexandro Bakhito | | (substituted on) 68' |
| MF | 15 | Palomito Ribeiro | | (substituted on) 68' |
| FW | 7 | Luís Figo | | (substituted on) 77' |
| DF | 4 | Anizo Correia | | (substituted on) 77' |
Manager
(Portugal) Zé Pedro

Hyundai Player of the Match:
Hav Soknet (Cambodia)

Assistant referees:
Muhammad Shafiq bin Ahmad Said (Malaysia)
Kesava Raj (Malaysia)
Fourth official:
Mohamad Nawal Bin Mohammad Zubir (Malaysia)
Video assistant referee:
Pansa Chaisanit (Thailand)
Assistant video assistant referee:
Jun Mihara (Japan)

=== Indonesia vs Vietnam ===
3 August 2026
20:30 UTC+7

| Indonesia | 0–3 | Vietnam |
|---|---|---|
| | Report | Nguyễn Văn Vĩ 6'; Nguyễn Hai Long 14'; Nguyễn Xuân Son 71' |

Pakansari Stadium, Bogor
Attendance: 27,265
Referee: Tim Danaskos (Australia)

| Indonesia | Vietnam |

| GK | 1 | Nadeo Argawinata |
| CB | 5 | Rizky Ridho (c) |
| CB | 4 | Jordi Amat |
| CB | 20 | Shayne Pattynama |
| RWB | 14 | Eliano Reijnders |
| LWB | 16 | Dony Tri Pamungkas | | (substituted off) 65' |
| RM | 19 | Thom Haye | (yellow card) 31' |
| CM | 18 | Ivar Jenner | (yellow card) 76' | (substituted off) 90+2' |
| CM | 23 | Marc Klok | | (substituted off) 65' |
| LM | 11 | Ragnar Oratmangoen | | (substituted off) 65' |
| CF | 9 | Mitchell Baker | | (substituted off) 82' |
Substitutions:
| MF | 13 | Beckham Putra | | (substituted on) 65' |
| FW | 24 | Jens Raven | | (substituted on) 65' |
| DF | 26 | Tim Geypens | | (substituted on) 65' |
| FW | 17 | Rizky Eka Pratama | | (substituted on) 82' |
| MF | 21 | Rayhan Hannan | | (substituted on) 90+2' |
Manager:
(England) John Herdman

| GK | 1 | Lê Giang Patrik |
| CB | 20 | Bùi Hoàng Việt Anh | (substituted off) 81' |
| CB | 16 | Nguyễn Thành Chung |
| CB | 7 | Phạm Xuân Mạnh |
| RWB | 15 | Trương Tiến Anh |
| LWB | 3 | Nguyễn Văn Vĩ | (substituted off) 81' |
| RM | 13 | Nguyễn Tài Lộc | (substituted off) 63' |
| CM | 8 | Lê Phạm Thành Long |
| CM | 14 | Nguyễn Hoàng Đức (c) | (substituted off) 87' |
| LM | 18 | Nguyễn Hai Long | (substituted off) 63' |
| CF | 9 | Nguyễn Đình Bắc |
Substitutions:
| FW | 12 | Nguyễn Xuân Son | (substituted on) 63' |
| MF | 10 | Đỗ Hoàng Hên | (substituted on) 63' |
| DF | 5 | Đoàn Văn Hậu | (substituted on) 81' |
| DF | 6 | Nguyễn Nhật Minh | (substituted on) 81' |
| MF | 19 | Nguyễn Quang Hải | (substituted on) 87' |
Manager:
(South Korea) Kim Sang-sik

Hyundai Player of the Match:
Nguyễn Văn Vĩ (Vietnam)

Assistant referees:
Andrew Meimarakis (Australia)
Brad Wright (Australia)
Fourth official:
Alongkorn Khonwai (Thailand)
Video assistant referee:
Farhad bin Mohamed (Singapore)
Assistant video assistant referee:
Lee Seul-gi (South Korea)

=== Vietnam vs Cambodia ===
7 August 2026
20:00 UTC+7

| Vietnam | 3–1 | Cambodia |
|---|---|---|
| Nguyễn Đình Bắc 18', 89'; Vakhim 84' (o.g.) | Report | Bento 71' |

Mỹ Đình National Stadium, Hanoi
Attendance: 19,628
Referee: Mario Cheung Wai Lung (Hong Kong)

| Vietnam | Cambodia |

| GK | 1 | Lê Giang Patrik |
| CB | 20 | Bùi Hoàng Việt Anh |
| CB | 16 | Nguyễn Thành Chung |
| CB | 7 | Phạm Xuân Mạnh | (substituted off) 79' |
| RM | 15 | Trương Tiến Anh | (substituted off) 90+2' |
| CM | 8 | Lê Phạm Thành Long |
| CM | 14 | Nguyễn Hoàng Đức | (substituted off) 46' |
| LM | 18 | Nguyễn Hai Long |
| RF | 19 | Nguyễn Quang Hải (c) | (substituted off) 79' |
| CF | 9 | Nguyễn Đình Bắc |
| LF | 3 | Nguyễn Văn Vĩ | (substituted off) 66' |
Substitutions:
| FW | 12 | Nguyễn Xuân Son | (substituted on) 46' |
| MF | 13 | Nguyễn Tài Lộc | (substituted on) 66' |
| DF | 11 | Khổng Minh Gia Bảo | (substituted on) 79' |
| FW | 22 | Nguyễn Trần Việt Cường | (substituted on) 79' |
| FW | 17 | Phạm Gia Hưng | (substituted on) 90+2' |
Manager:
(South Korea) Kim Sang-sik

| GK | 1 | Koy Salim |
| RB | 18 | Ouk Sovann (c) |
| CB | 5 | Hikaru Mizuno |
| CB | 24 | Im Vakhim |
| LB | 26 | Chea Sokmeng | | (substituted off) 85' |
| RM | 3 | Sophal Dimong | | (substituted off) 57' |
| CM | 6 | Yudai Ogawa | (yellow card) 74' |
| CM | 8 | Bong Samuel |
| LM | 15 | Tum Makara | | (substituted off) 90' |
| CF | 17 | Sa Ty | | (substituted off) 46' |
| CF | 14 | Hav Soknet | | (substituted off) 46' |
Substitutions:
| MF | 7 | Iago Bento | | (substituted on) 46' |
| FW | 11 | Mon Rado | | (substituted on) 46' |
| DF | 19 | Phat Sokha | | (substituted on) 57' |
| FW | 25 | Mon Vanda | | (substituted on) 85' |
| FW | 16 | Yem Devit | | (substituted on) 90' |
Manager
(Japan) Koji Gyotoku

Hyundai Player of the Match:
Nguyễn Đình Bắc (Vietnam)

Assistant referees:
Lam Cheuk Hong (Hong Kong)
Apichit Nophuan (Thailand)
Fourth official:
Alongkorn Khonwai (Thailand)
Video assistant referee:
Farhad bin Mohamed (Singapore)
Assistant video assistant referee:
Lee Seul-gi (South Korea)

=== Singapore vs Indonesia ===
7 August 2026
21:00 UTC+8

| Singapore | 1–1 | Indonesia |
|---|---|---|
| Ilhan 66' | Report | Oratmangoen 47' |

Jalan Besar Stadium, Kallang
Attendance: 5,113
Referee: Abdullah Salim Khalfan Al-Amouri (Oman)

| Singapore | Indonesia |

| GK | 1 | Izwan Mahbud |
| RB | 15 | Lionel Tan | (yellow card) 77' | (substituted off) 88' |
| CB | 14 | Hariss Harun (c) |
| CB | 18 | Jacob Mahler | (yellow card) 90+7' |
| LB | 26 | Nur Adam Abdullah |
| CM | 8 | Shah Shahiran |
| CM | 16 | Hami Syahin | | (substituted off) 67' |
| RW | 11 | Glenn Kweh | | (substituted off) 73' |
| AM | 13 | Harhys Stewart |
| LW | 7 | Song Ui-young | (yellow card) 43' | (substituted off) 73' |
| CF | 19 | Ilhan Fandi | | (substituted off) 67' |
Substitutions:
| FW | 20 | Shawal Anuar | | (substituted on) 67' |
| DF | 17 | Irfan Fandi | | (substituted on) 67' |
| MF | 10 | Farhan Zulkifli | | (substituted on) 73' |
| DF | 3 | Ryhan Stewart | | (substituted on) 73' |
| DF | 5 | Amirul Adli | | (substituted on) 88' |
Manager:
Gavin Lee

| GK | 12 | Cahya Supriadi |
| CB | 3 | Wahyu Prasetyo | | (substituted off) 80' |
| CB | 5 | Rizky Ridho (c) |
| CB | 20 | Shayne Pattynama |
| RWB | 14 | Eliano Reijnders | | (substituted off) 69' |
| LWB | 16 | Dony Tri Pamungkas |
| CM | 18 | Ivar Jenner | (yellow card) 58' | (substituted off) 89' |
| CM | 23 | Marc Klok | (yellow card) 82' | (substituted off) 89' |
| CM | 11 | Ragnar Oratmangoen | | (substituted off) 80' |
| CF | 19 | Thom Haye |
| CF | 9 | Mitchell Baker | (yellow card) 76' |
Substitutions:
| FW | 17 | Rizky Eka Pratama | | (substituted on) 69' |
| MF | 15 | Saddil Ramdani | | (substituted on) 80' |
| DF | 26 | Tim Geypens | (yellow card) 86' | (substituted on) 80' |
| MF | 13 | Beckham Putra | | (substituted on) 89' |
| FW | 24 | Jens Raven | | (substituted on) 89' |
Manager:
(England) John Herdman

Hyundai Player of the Match:
Jacob Mahler (Singapore)

Assistant referees:
Nasser Salim Abdullah Ambusaidi (Oman)
Zainal Abidin (Malaysia)
Fourth official:
Zakaria Ismail (Malaysia)
Video assistant referee:
Pansa Chaisanit (Thailand)
Assistant video assistant referee:
Jun Mihara (Japan)

== Discipline ==
The team conduct ("fair play") score would have been used as a tiebreaker if the head-to-head and overall records of teams were tied. The score was calculated based on yellow and red cards received by players and team officials in all group matches as follows:

- yellow card: −1 point;
- indirect red card (second yellow card): −3 points;
- direct red card: −4 points;
- yellow card and direct red card: −5 points;

Only one of the above deductions could be applied to a player or team official in a single match.

| Team | Match 1 | | | | Match 2 | | | | Match 3 | | | | Match 4 | | | | Match 5 | | | | Score |
| Team | Yellow card | (yellow card) (yellow-red card) | Red card | (yellow card) (red card) | Yellow card | (yellow card) (yellow-red card) | Red card | (yellow card) (red card) | Yellow card | (yellow card) (yellow-red card) | Red card | (yellow card) (red card) | Yellow card | (yellow card) (yellow-red card) | Red card | (yellow card) (red card) | Yellow card | (yellow card) (yellow-red card) | Red card | (yellow card) (red card) | Score |
|---|---|---|---|---|---|---|---|---|---|---|---|---|---|---|---|---|---|---|---|---|---|
| Vietnam | | | | | | | | | 1 | | | | | | | | | | | | –1 |
| Cambodia | 1 | | | | 1 | | | | | | | | 1 | | | | 1 | | | | –4 |
| Singapore | 1 | | | | 3 | | | | 1 | | | | | | | | 3 | | | | –8 |
| Timor-Leste | 1 | | | | 2 | | | | 2 | 1 | | | 1 | | | | | | | | –9 |
| Indonesia | | | | | 1 | | | | 3 | | | | 2 | | | | 4 | | | | –10 |
