= Cambodia national football team results (2020–present) =

This article provides details of international football games played by the Cambodia national football team from the 2020s.

== 2020 ==
The Cambodia national football team had no matches because due to the COVID-19 pandemic.

== 2021 ==
3 June 2021 2022 WCQ R2	Bahrain	8–0	Cambodia	Riffa, Bahrain
19:30 UTC+3	Al Aswad 8', 71'; Al-Romaihi 45+2'; Madan 46', 65'; Al-Shaikh 51'; Abdullatif 75', 90+2'	Report		Stadium: Bahrain National Stadium; Referee: Hiroyuki Kimura (Japan)

7 June 2021 2022 WCQ R2	Iraq	4–1	Cambodia	Arad, Bahrain
17:30 UTC+3	M. Ali 1'; Resan 23'; Adnan 27' (pen.); Hadi 90+3'	Report	Visal 55'	Stadium: Al Muharraq Stadium; Referee: Yaqoob Abdul Baki (Oman)

11 June 2021 2022 WCQ R2	Cambodia	0–10	Iran	Isa Town, Bahrain
17:30 UTC+3		Report	Jahanbakhsh 16' (pen.); Khalilzadeh 22'; Taremi 27'; Rotana 32' (o.g.); Mohammadi 58'; Pouraliganji 64'; Ansarifard 77' (pen.); Rezaei 80', 87'; Ghayedi 84'	Stadium: Khalifa Sports City Stadium, Bahrain; Referee: Kim Jong-hyeok (South Korea)

9 October 2021 2023 ACQ play-off	Guam	0–1	Cambodia	Isa Town, Bahrain
20:30 UTC+3		Report	Vathanaka 26'	Stadium: Khalifa Sports City Stadium; Referee: Hussein Abo Yehia (Lebanon)

12 October 2021 2023 ACQ play-off	Cambodia	2–1	Guam	Isa Town, Bahrain
	Suhana 51'; Sokpheng 55'	Report	Devan 35'	Stadium: Khalifa Sports City Stadium; Referee: Ismaeel Habib (Bahrain)

6 December 2021 2020 AFF Championship	Cambodia	1–3	Malaysia	Bishan, Singapore
17:30	Rosib 90' (pen.)	Report	Safawi 23' (pen.); Akhyar 61'; Kogileswaran 78'	Stadium: Bishan Stadium; Referee: Shukri Hussain Al-Alhunfush (Saudi Arabia)

9 December 2021 2020 AFF Championship	Indonesia	4–2	Cambodia	Bishan, Singapore
20:30	Irianto 4', 33'; Evan 17'; Ramai 54'	Report	Safy 38'; Mony Udom 60'	Stadium: Bishan Stadium; Referee: Yaqoob Abdul Baki (Oman)

15 December 2021 2020 AFF Championship	Cambodia	3–0	Laos	Bishan, Singapore
17:30	Vathanaka 31', 41'; Chanthea 74'	Report		Stadium: Bishan Stadium; Referee: Ahmad A'Qashan (Singapore)

19 December 2021 2020 AFF Championship	Vietnam	4–0	Cambodia	Bishan, Singapore
20:30	Nguyễn Tiến Linh 3', 27'; Bùi Tiến Dũng 55'; Nguyễn Quang Hải 57'	Report		Stadium: Bishan Stadium; Referee: Yaqoob Abdul Baki (Oman)

== 2022 ==
2 June 2022 Friendly	Cambodia	2–1	Timor Leste U-23	Phnom Penh, Cambodia
19:00	Sokpheng 39'; Chanchav 84'		Mouzinho 22'	Stadium: Morodok Techo National Stadium; Attendance: 17,500

8 June 2022 AFC AC Q	India	2–0	Cambodia	Kolkata, India
IST	Chhetri 14' (pen.), 60'	Report		Stadium: Salt Lake Stadium; Attendance: 26,118; Referee: Baraa Aisha (Palestine)

11 June 2022 AFC AC Q	Cambodia	0–3	Hong Kong	Kolkata, India
IST		Report	Orr 19'; Sun Ming Him 21'; Chan Siu Kwan 63'	Stadium: Salt Lake Stadium; Attendance: 1,078; Referee: Yousif Saeed Hasan (Iraq)

14 June 2022 AFC AC Q	Afghanistan	2–2	Cambodia	Kolkata, India
IST	Shayesteh 16'; Zazai 35'	Report	Thiva 37'; Sokpheng 81'	Stadium: Salt Lake Stadium; Attendance: 982; Referee: Payam Heidari (Iran)

22 September 2022 Friendly	Cambodia	0–1	Bangladesh	Phnom Penh, Cambodia
19:00 UTC+7			Rakib 23'	Stadium: Morodok Techo National Stadium; Referee: Suhaizi Shukri (Malaysia)

9 December 2022 Friendly	Malaysia	4–0	Cambodia	Kuala Lumpur, Malaysia
21:00 UTC+8	Faisal 11', 45+1'; Lee 38'; Stuart 86'			Stadium: Bukit Jalil Stadium; Referee: Mongkolchai Pechsri (Thailand)

20 December 2022 AFF Championship Group Stage	Cambodia	3–2	Philippines	Phnom Penh, Cambodia
17:00 UTC+7	Bunheing 16', 59'; Chanpolin 20'	Report	Daniels 41', 55'	Stadium: Morodok Techo National Stadium; Attendance: 4,860; Referee: Majed Al Shamrani (Saudi Arabia)

23 December 2022 AFF Championship	Indonesia	2–1	Cambodia	Jakarta, Indonesia
16:30 UTC+7	Egy 7'; Witan 35'	Report	Krya 16'	Stadium: Gelora Bung Karno Stadium; Attendance: 25,332; Referee: Ryuji Sato (Japan)

29 December 2022 AFF Championship	Cambodia	5–1	Brunei	Phnom Penh, Cambodia
17:00 UTC+7	Chanchav 31'; Taylor 50' (pen.); Sokpheng 73' (pen.); Pisoth 80', 88'	Report	Nur Ikhwan 21'	Stadium: Morodok Techo National Stadium; Attendance: 6,169; Referee: Choi Hyun-jai (South Korea)

== 2023 ==
2 January 2023 AFF Championship	Thailand	3–1	Cambodia	Pathum Thani, Thailand
19:30 UTC+7	Teerasil 45+2' (pen.), 90'; Sumanya 50'	Report	Chanthea 68'	Stadium: Thammasat Stadium; Attendance: 8,415; Referee: Omar Mohamed Al Ali (United Arab Emirates)

15 June 2023 Friendly	Cambodia	0–1	Bangladesh	Phnom Penh, Cambodia
19:00 UTC+7			Jony 24'; Kazi (red card) 90'	Stadium: Phnom Penh Olympic Stadium; Attendance: 30,000; Referee: Jumpaoon Wiwat (Thailand)

18 June 2023 Friendly	Cambodia	Cancelled	Solomon Islands	Phnom Penh, Cambodia
19:00 UTC+7		Report		Stadium: Phnom Penh Olympic Stadium

? June Hybrid friendly	Cambodia	1–0	(Cambodia) Visakha U-18	Phnom Penh, Cambodia
		Report		Stadium: Prince Stadium

? June Hybrid friendly	Cambodia	2–2	(Cambodia) Phnom Penh Crown	Phnom Penh, Cambodia
		Report		Stadium: RSN Stadium

7 September 2023 Friendly	Cambodia	1–1	Hong Kong	Phnom Penh, Cambodia
19:00 UTC+7	Sophanat 90'		Everton 21'	Stadium: National Olympic Stadium; Attendance: 30,000

11 September 2023 Friendly	Cambodia	4–0	Macau	Phnom Penh, Cambodia
19:00 UTC+7	Chanthea 19', 21'; Visal 40'; Bunheing 79'			Stadium: National Olympic Stadium; Attendance: 30,000

12 October 2023 2026 FIFA World Cup qualification - AFC first round	Cambodia	0–0	Pakistan	Phnom Penh, Cambodia
				Stadium: National Olympic Stadium; Attendance: 11,500

17 October 2023 2026 FIFA World Cup qualification - AFC first round	Pakistan	1–0 (1–0 agg.)	Cambodia	Islamabad, Pakistan
	Hamid 68'	Report		Stadium: Jinnah Sports Stadium; Attendance: 13,000; Referee: Feras Taweel (Syria)

31 December 2023 Friendly	Qatar	3–0	Cambodia	Al Rayyan, Qatar
18:00 UTC+3	Ali 12', 20', 43'	Report		Stadium: Thani bin Jassim Stadium; Attendance: 0 Referee: Mahmood Al-Majarafi (Oman)

== 2024 ==
22 March 2024 FIFA Series	Equatorial Guinea	2–0	Cambodia	Jeddah, Saudi Arabia
22:00 UTC+3	Nlavo 10'; Joanet 36'	Report		Stadium: Prince Abdullah Al-Faisal Sports City; Referee: Hussain Al-Shuwaikh (Bahrain)

26 March 2024 FIFA Series	Guyana	4–1	Cambodia	Jeddah, Saudi Arabia
22:00 UTC+3	Glasgow 20', 59' (pen.); Lovell 80'; Khedoo 90+2'	Report	Chanthea 53'	Stadium: Prince Abdullah Al-Faisal Sports City; Referee: Faisal Suleiman Al-Balawi (Saudi Arabia)

7 June Friendly	Cambodia	2–0	Mongolia	Phnom Penh, Cambodia
18:00 UTC+7	Ogawa 22'Ty 30'		Batbaatar (red card) 72'	Stadium: Phnom Penh Olympic Stadium; Attendance: 15266; Referee: Warinthon Sassadee (Thailand)

11 June Friendly	Mongolia	2–1	Cambodia	Ulaanbaatar, Mongolia
17:00 UTC+8	Naranbold 53'; Gantogtokh Gantuya 61'		Ty 17'	Stadium: MFF Football Centre; Referee: Tam Ping Wun (Hong Kong)

5 September 2027 AFC Asian Cup qualification – play-off round	Sri Lanka	0–0	Cambodia	Colombo, Sri Lanka
15:00 UTC+5:30		Report		Stadium: Colombo Racecourse; Attendance: 2,955; Referee: Sultan Mohamed Al-Hammadi (United Arab Emirates)

10 September 2027 AFC Asian Cup qualification – play-off round	Cambodia	2–2 (a.e.t.) (2–4 p)	Sri Lanka	Phnom Penh, Cambodia
19:00 UTC+7	Nhean 58'; Sos 98'		Kelaart 37'; Kammerknecht 120+2'	Stadium: Phnom Penh Olympic Stadium; Referee: Asker Nadjafaliyev (Uzbekistan)
	Penalties
	Taylor (penalty missed); Orn (penalty missed); Lim (penalty scored); Soeuy (penalty scored)		(penalty scored) Hingert; (penalty scored) Durrant; (penalty scored) Kelaart; (penalty scored) Perera

11 October Friendly	Cambodia	3–2	Chinese Taipei	Phnom Penh, Cambodia
19:00 UTC+7	Ratanak 48', 88'; Chanthea 62'		Ogawa 44' (o.g.); Chen 83'	Stadium: Phnom Penh Olympic Stadium

15 October Friendly	Hong Kong	3–0	Cambodia	So Kon Po, Hong Kong
20:00 UTC+8	Orr 29'; Averton 35'; Stefan 90+2'			Stadium: Hong Kong Stadium; Referee: Hoang Ngoc Ha (Vietnam)

16 November Hybrid Friendly	Qatar U-23	2–1	Cambodia	Doha, Qatar
19:15 UTC+3	Hamza 8'; Sharshani 35'		Ratanak 55'	Stadium: Hamad bin Khalifa Stadium; Attendance: 0

8 December 2024 ASEAN Championship	Cambodia	2–2	Malaysia	Phnom Penh, Cambodia
17:45 UTC+7	Coulibaly 52'; Ty 60'	Report	Wilkin 35'; Tierney 74'	Stadium: Olympic Stadium; Attendance: 24,886; Referee: Kim Woo-sung (South Korea)

11 December 2024 ASEAN Championship	Singapore	2–1	Cambodia	Kallang, Singapore
19:00 UTC+8	Faris 9'; Shawal 16'	Report	Chanthea 59'	Stadium: National Stadium; Attendance: 12,391; Referee: Ahmed Faisal Al-Ali (Jordan)

17 December 2024 ASEAN Championship	Cambodia	2–1	Timor-Leste	Phnom Penh, Cambodia
17:45 UTC+7	Rotana 42'; Soknet 79'	Report	João Pedro 22'	Stadium: Olympic Stadium; Attendance: 17,109; Referee: Firdavs Norsafarov (Uzbekistan Football)

20 December 2024 ASEAN Championship	Thailand	3–2	Cambodia	Bangkok, Thailand
20:00 UTC+7	Akarapong 33', 78'; Chalermsak 84'	Report	Nieto 32'; Abdel 90+6'	Stadium: Rajamangala Stadium; Attendance: 15,261; Referee: Tam Ping Wun (Hong Kong)

== 2025 ==
19 March Friendly	Vietnam	2–1	Cambodia	Thủ Dầu Một, Vietnam
19:30 UTC+7	Nguyễn Hai Long 26'; Nguyễn Văn Vĩ 35'	Report	Samuel 64'	Stadium: Gò Đậu Stadium; Referee: Tam Ping Wun (Hong Kong)

25 March Friendly	Cambodia	1–2	Aruba	Phnom Penh, Cambodia
19:00 UTC+7	Luydens 57' (o.g.); Ogawa (red card) 42'; Nieto (red card) 90'	Report	Bennett 3'; Ostiana 11'	Stadium: Olympic Stadium; Referee: Leow Hong Wei (Singapore)

5 June Friendly	Cambodia	1–2	Tajikistan	Phnom Penh, Cambodia
19:00 UTC+7	Ratanak 71'	Report	Samiev 51'; Panjshanbe 63'	Stadium: Olympic Stadium; Attendance: 13,780; Referee: Takasaki Koji (Japan)

13 November Friendly	Hong Kong	1–1	Cambodia	So Kon Po, Hong Kong
20:00 UTC+8	Wong Wai 31'	Report	Krya 33'	Stadium: Hong Kong Stadium; Attendance: 7,480; Referee: Lê Vũ Linh (Vietnam)

== 2026 ==
4 June Friendly	Cambodia	4–0	Bhutan	Phnom Penh, Cambodia
19:00 UTC+7	Rotana 7'; Coulibaly 39'; Dimong 69'; Rado 86'	Report		Stadium: Olympic Stadium; Referee: Tam Ping Wun (Hong Kong)

9 June Friendly	Cambodia	2–0	Hong Kong	Phnom Penh, Cambodia
19:00 UTC+7	Ogawa 45+1'; Chanthea 50'	Report		Stadium: Olympic Stadium; Attendance: 20,685; Referee: Yudi Nurcahya (Indonesia)

16 July Closed-Door Friendly	Ryutsu Keizai University (Japan)	2–1	Cambodia	Gotemba, Japan
15:00 UTC+9		Report		Stadium: Tokinosumika Sports Center

19 July Closed-Door Friendly	Honda FC (Japan)	0–3	Cambodia	Hamamatsu, Japan
15:00 UTC+9		Report		Stadium: Honda Miyakoda Soccer Stadium

24 July 2026 ASEAN Championship	Cambodia	1–2	Singapore	Phnom Penh, Cambodia
19:00 UTC+7	Ouk 55'	Report	Shawal 22'; Ilhan Fandi 90+11'	Stadium: Morodok Techo National Stadium, Phnom Penh; Attendance: 27,790; Referee: Koji Takasaki (Japan)

27 July 2026 ASEAN Championship	Indonesia	5–1	Cambodia	Bogor, Indonesia
20:30 UTC+7	Baker 6', 15', 56'; Walsh 24'; Raven 86'	Report	Nadeo 48' (o.g.)	Stadium: Pakansari Stadium; Attendance: 22,485; Referee: Kim Woo-sung (South Korea)

3 August 2026 ASEAN Championship	Cambodia	3–0	Timor-Leste	Phnom Penh, Cambodia
17;30 UTC+7	Soknet 16', 63'; Rado 90'	Report		Stadium: Morodok Techo National Stadium; Referee: Zakaria Ismail (Malaysia)

7 August 2026 ASEAN Championship	Vietnam	3–1	Cambodia	Hanoi, Vietnam
20:00 UTC+7	Nguyễn Đình Bắc 18', 89'; Vakhim 84' (o.g.)	Report	Bento 71'	Stadium: Mỹ Đình National Stadium; Referee: Cheung Wai Lung Mario (Hong Kong)

27 September 2026 FIFA ASEAN Cup Division 2 Group B	Cambodia	1-0	Myanmar	Kowloon, Hong Kong
18:00 UTC+8	Kakada 90+4'	Report		Stadium: Kai Tak Stadium; Referee: Wai Lun Wong

30 September 2026 FIFA ASEAN Cup Division 2 Group B	Timor-Leste	2-2	Cambodia	Kowloon, Hong Kong
17:00 UTC+8				Stadium: Kai Tak Stadium
