= Timor-Leste national football team results =

This article details the match results and statistics of the Timor-Leste national football team.

== Key ==
Key to matches

- Att. = Match attendance
- (H) = Home ground
- (A) = Away ground
- (N) = Neutral ground

Key to record by opponent

- Pld = Games played
- W = Games won
- D = Games drawn
- L = Games lost
- GF = Goals for
- GA = Goals against

== Results ==
Timor-Leste's score is shown first in each case.

No.	Date	Venue	Opponents	Score	Competition	Timor-Leste scorers	Att.	Ref.
1	21 March 2003	Colombo (A)	Sri Lanka	2–3	2004 AFC Asian Cup qualification	Hamza (o.g.), Cabral	—	
2	23 March 2003	Colombo (N)	Chinese Taipei	0–3	2004 AFC Asian Cup qualification		—	
3	8 December 2004	Bukit Jalil National Stadium, Kuala Lumpur (A)	Malaysia	0–5	2004 AFF Championship		—	
4	12 December 2004	Bukit Jalil National Stadium, Kuala Lumpur (N)	Thailand	0–8	2004 AFF Championship		—	
5	14 December 2004	Bukit Jalil National Stadium, Kuala Lumpur (N)	Philippines	1–2	2004 AFF Championship	do Rego	—	
6	16 December 2004	Bukit Jalil National Stadium, Kuala Lumpur (N)	Myanmar	1–3	2004 AFF Championship	Diamantino	—	
7	12 December 2006	Panaad Stadium, Bacolod (N)	Brunei	2–3	2007 AFF Championship qualification	Costa, Belo	—	
8	14 December 2006	Panaad Stadium, Bacolod (A)	Philippines	0–7	2007 AFF Championship qualification		—	
9	16 December 2006	Panaad Stadium, Bacolod (N)	Laos	2–3	2007 AFF Championship qualification	Ximenes, Costa	—	
10	20 December 2006	Panaad Stadium, Bacolod (N)	Cambodia	1–4	2007 AFF Championship qualification	Costa	—	
11	21 October 2007	Gianyar Stadium, Gianyar (H) (Note: Timor-Leste elected to play their home leg in Indonesia.)	Hong Kong	2–3	2010 FIFA World Cup qualification	Ary (2)	1,500	
12	28 October 2007	Hong Kong Stadium, So Kon Po (A)	Hong Kong	1–8	2010 FIFA World Cup qualification	Ary	1,542	
13	17 October 2008	National Olympic Stadium, Phnom Penh (N)	Philippines	0–1	2008 AFF Championship qualification		—	
14	19 October 2008	National Olympic Stadium, Phnom Penh (A)	Cambodia	2–2	2008 AFF Championship qualification	Barbosa, Pereira	12,000	
15	21 October 2008	National Olympic Stadium, Phnom Penh (N)	Brunei	1–4	2008 AFF Championship qualification	Soares	—	
16	25 October 2008	National Olympic Stadium, Phnom Penh (N)	Laos	1–2	2008 AFF Championship qualification	Esteves	—	
17	22 October 2010	National Sports Complex, Vientiane (N)	Philippines	0–5	2010 AFF Championship qualification		—	
18	24 October 2010	National Sports Complex, Vientiane (N)	Cambodia	2–4	2010 AFF Championship qualification	Chiquito, Anggisu	—	
19	26 October 2010	National Sports Complex, Vientiane (A)	Laos	1–6	2010 AFF Championship qualification	Chiquito	—	
20	21 November 2010	Gelora Sriwijaya Stadium, Palembang (A)	Indonesia	0–6	Friendly		—	
21	29 June 2011	Dasarath Rangasala Stadium, Kathmandu (A)	Nepal	1–2	2014 FIFA World Cup qualification	Kik	9,000	
22	2 July 2011	Dasarath Rangasala Stadium, Kathmandu (H) (Note: Due to a lack of technical infrastructure in Timor-Leste, both legs were played in Nepal.)	Nepal	0–5	2014 FIFA World Cup qualification		15,000	
23	5 October 2012	Thuwunna Stadium, Yangon (N)	Cambodia	5–1	2012 AFF Championship qualification	Murilo (2), Ade (2), Alan	500	
24	7 October 2012	Thuwunna Stadium, Yangon (A)	Myanmar	1–2	2012 AFF Championship qualification	Alan	8,000	
25	9 October 2012	Thuwunna Stadium, Yangon (N)	Laos	3–1	2012 AFF Championship qualification	Murilo, Ade, Alan	—	
26	13 October 2012	Thuwunna Stadium, Yangon (N)	Brunei	1–2	2012 AFF Championship qualification	Pinto	—	
27	14 November 2012	Gelora Bung Karno Stadium, Jakarta (A)	Indonesia	0–1	Friendly		—	
28	12 October 2014	New Laos National Stadium, Vientiane (N)	Brunei	4–2	2014 AFF Championship qualification	Murilo (3), Fabiano	—	
29	14 October 2014	New Laos National Stadium, Vientiane (N)	Myanmar	0–0	2014 AFF Championship qualification		—	
30	16 October 2014	New Laos National Stadium, Vientiane (N)	Cambodia	2–3	2014 AFF Championship qualification	Anggisu, Bertoldo	—	
31	18 October 2014	New Laos National Stadium, Vientiane (N)	Laos	0–2	2014 AFF Championship qualification		—	
32	11 November 2014	Gelora Bung Karno Stadium, Jakarta (A)	Indonesia	0–4	Friendly		—	
33	12 March 2015	National Stadium, Dili (H)	Mongolia	4–1	2018 FIFA World Cup qualification	Chiquito (2), Silva, Neto	9,000	
34	17 March 2015	MFF Football Centre, Ulaanbaatar (A)	Mongolia	1–0	2018 FIFA World Cup qualification	Fabiano	5,000	
35	11 June 2015	Bukit Jalil National Stadium, Kuala Lumpur (A)	Malaysia	1–1	2018 FIFA World Cup qualification	Saro	5,000	
36	16 June 2015	Shah Alam Stadium, Shah Alam (H) (Note: Timor-Leste hosted the UAE in Malaysia due to the lack of a suitable venue in Dili.)	United Arab Emirates	0–1	2018 FIFA World Cup qualification		200	
37	3 September 2015	King Abdullah Sports City, Jeddah (A)	Saudi Arabia	0–7	2018 FIFA World Cup qualification		11,000	
38	8 October 2015	National Stadium, Dili (H)	Palestine	1–1	2018 FIFA World Cup qualification	Saro	2,000	
39	13 October 2015	National Stadium, Dili (H)	Malaysia	0–1	2018 FIFA World Cup qualification		2,500	
40	12 November 2015	Mohammed Bin Zayed Stadium, Abu Dhabi (A)	United Arab Emirates	0–8	2018 FIFA World Cup qualification		7,870	
41	17 November 2015	National Stadium, Dili (H)	Saudi Arabia	0–10	2018 FIFA World Cup qualification		2,000	
42	29 March 2016	Dora International Stadium, Hebron (A)	Palestine	0–7	2018 FIFA World Cup qualification		6,000	
43	29 May 2016	National Olympic Stadium, Phnom Penh (A)	Cambodia	0–2	Friendly		—	
44	2 June 2016	Tan Sri Dato Haji Hassan Yunos Stadium, Johor Bahru (A)	Malaysia	0–3	2019 AFC Asian Cup qualification		3,600	
45	6 June 2016	Tan Sri Dato Haji Hassan Yunos Stadium, Johor Bahru (H) (Note: Timor-Leste hosted Malaysia in Malaysia due to the lack of a suitable venue in Dili.)	Malaysia	0–3	2019 AFC Asian Cup qualification		1,145	
46	8 October 2016	National Stadium, Kaohsiung (H) (Note: Timor-Leste hosted Chinese Taipei in Taiwan due to the lack of a suitable venue in Dili.)	Chinese Taipei	1–2	2019 AFC Asian Cup qualification	Gama	2,849	
47	11 October 2016	National Stadium, Kaohsiung (A)	Chinese Taipei	1–2	2019 AFC Asian Cup qualification	Oliveira	1,000	
48	15 October 2016	National Olympic Stadium, Phnom Penh (N)	Brunei	1–2	2016 AFF Championship qualification	Gama	45,000	
49	18 October 2016	National Olympic Stadium, Phnom Penh (N)	Laos	1–2	2016 AFF Championship qualification	Maia	12,000	
50	21 October 2016	National Olympic Stadium, Phnom Penh (A)	Cambodia	2–3	2016 AFF Championship qualification	Anggisu, Viegas	55,000	
51	2 November 2016	Sarawak Stadium, Kuching (N)	Brunei	0–4	2016 AFC Solidarity Cup		100	
52	5 November 2016	Sarawak Stadium, Kuching (N)	Nepal	0–0	2016 AFC Solidarity Cup		315	
53	3 December 2017	Taipei Municipal Stadium, Taipei (N)	Laos	1–2	2017 CTFA International Tournament	Cruz	—	
54	4 December 2017	Taipei Municipal Stadium, Taipei (A)	Chinese Taipei	1–3	2017 CTFA International Tournament	Gama	—	
55	5 December 2017	Taipei Municipal Stadium, Taipei (N)	Philippines	1–0	2017 CTFA International Tournament	Garcia	—	
56	1 September 2018	Kuala Lumpur Stadium, Kuala Lumpur (H) (Note: Timor-Leste hosted Brunei in Malaysia due to the lack of a suitable venue in Dili.)	Brunei	3–1	2018 AFF Championship qualification	Cruz (2), Garcia	261	
57	8 September 2018	Hassanal Bolkiah National Stadium, Bandar Seri Begawan (A)	Brunei	0–1	2018 AFF Championship qualification		2,345	
58	11 October 2018	National Olympic Stadium, Phnom Penh (A)	Cambodia	2–2	Friendly	Almeida, Gama	—	
59	9 November 2018	Rajamangala Stadium, Bangkok (H) (Note: Timor-Leste hosted Thailand in Thailand.)	Thailand	0–7	2018 AFF Championship		8,764	
60	13 November 2018	Gelora Bung Karno Stadium, Jakarta (A)	Indonesia	1–3	2018 AFF Championship	Gama	15,138	
61	17 November 2018	Kuala Lumpur Stadium, Kuala Lumpur (H) (Note: Timor-Leste hosted the Philippines in Malaysia.)	Philippines	2–3	2018 AFF Championship	Reis, Pedro	312	
62	21 November 2018	National Stadium, Kallang (A)	Singapore	1–6	2018 AFF Championship	Gama	18,408	
63	7 June 2019	Bukit Jalil National Stadium, Kuala Lumpur (A)	Malaysia	1–7	2022 FIFA World Cup qualification	Pedro	4,244	
64	11 June 2019	Bukit Jalil National Stadium, Kuala Lumpur (H) (Note: Timor-Leste played their home match against Malaysia in the latter country due to a lack of a suitable venue in their country.)	Malaysia	1–5	2022 FIFA World Cup qualification	Gama	12,766	
65	5 December 2021	National Stadium, Kallang (N)	Thailand	0–2	2020 AFF Championship		2,432	
66	8 December 2021	National Stadium, Kallang (N)	Myanmar	0–2	2020 AFF Championship		970	
67	11 December 2021	National Stadium, Kallang (N)	Philippines	0–7	2020 AFF Championship		420	
68	14 December 2021	National Stadium, Kallang (A)	Singapore	0–2	2020 AFF Championship		8,518	
69	27 January 2022	Kapten I Wayan Dipta Stadium, Gianyar (A)	Indonesia	1–4	Friendly	Gali	—	
70	30 January 2022	Kapten I Wayan Dipta Stadium, Gianyar (A)	Indonesia	0–3	Friendly		—	
71	28 May 2022	Grand Hamad Stadium, Doha (N)	Nepal	2–2	Friendly	Firth, Correia	—	
72	2 June 2022	Morodok Techo National Stadium, Phnom Penh (A)	Cambodia	1–2	Friendly	Mouzinho	—	
73	16 July 2022	Kapten I Wayan Dipta Stadium, Gianyar (A)	Philippines	1–4	Friendly	Braz	—	
74	5 November 2022	Track & Field Sports Complex, Bandar Seri Begawan (A)	Brunei	2–6	2022 AFF Championship qualification	Mouzinho, Firth	600	
75	8 November 2022	Track & Field Sports Complex, Bandar Seri Begawan (H) (Note: Timor-Leste hosted Brunei in Brunei due to the lack of a suitable venue in Dili.)	Brunei	1–0	2022 AFF Championship qualification	Mouzinho	1,207	
76	12 October 2023	National Stadium, Kaohsiung (A)	Chinese Taipei	0–4	2026 FIFA World Cup qualification		1,894	
77	17 October 2023	National Stadium, Kaohsiung (H) (Note: Timor-Leste played their home game in Kaohsiung, due to the National Stadium in Dili failing to meet FIFA standards.)	Chinese Taipei	0–3	2026 FIFA World Cup qualification		745	
78	5 September 2024	Kapten I Wayan Dipta Stadium, Gianyar (H) (Note: Timor-Leste played their home game in Gianyar, due to the National Stadium in Dili failing to meet FIFA standards.)	Mongolia	4–1	2027 AFC Asian Cup qualification	Pedro (3), Zenivio	108	
79	10 September 2024	MFF Football Centre, Ulaanbaatar (A)	Mongolia	0–2	2027 AFC Asian Cup qualification		1,569	
80	8 October 2024	Hassanal Bolkiah National Stadium, Bandar Seri Begawan (A)	Brunei	1–0	2024 ASEAN Championship qualification	Gali	3,115	
81	15 October 2024	Chonburi Stadium, Chonburi (H) (Note: Timor-Leste hosted Brunei in Chonburi, Thailand due to the lack of a suitable venue in Dili.)	Brunei	0–0	2024 ASEAN Championship qualification		—	
82	8 December 2024	Hàng Đẫy Stadium, Hanoi (H) (Note: Timor-Leste played their home matches in Hanoi, Vietnam due to the lack of a suitable venue in Timor-Leste.)	Thailand	0–10	2024 ASEAN Championship		1,239	
83	11 December 2024	Bukit Jalil National Stadium, Kuala Lumpur (A)	Malaysia	2–3	2024 ASEAN Championship	Xavier, João Pedro	7,420	
84	14 December 2024	Hàng Đẫy Stadium, Hanoi (H)	Singapore	0–3	2024 ASEAN Championship		1,000	
85	17 December 2024	National Olympic Stadium, Phnom Penh (A)	Cambodia	1–2	2024 ASEAN Championship	João Pedro	17,109	
86	20 March 2025	Al-Khor SC Stadium, Al Khor (N)	Lebanon	0–4	Friendly			
87	25 March 2025	Republic Central Stadium, Dushanbe (A)	Tajikistan	0–1	2027 AFC Asian Cup qualification		8,520	
88	10 June 2025	Territory Rugby League Stadium, Darwin (H) (Note: Timor-Leste played their home game in Darwin, due to the National Stadium in Dili failing to meet FIFA standards.)	Maldives	1–0	2027 AFC Asian Cup qualification	João Pedro	1,048	
89	9 October 2025	Territory Rugby League Stadium, Darwin (H)	Philippines	1–4	2027 AFC Asian Cup qualification	Freitas	1,356	
90	14 October 2025	New Clark City Athletics Stadium, Capas (A)	Philippines	1–3	2027 AFC Asian Cup qualification	Rangel	8,753	
91	18 November 2025	Territory Rugby League Stadium, Darwin (H)	Tajikistan	0–5	2027 AFC Asian Cup qualification		538	
92	31 March 2026	National Football Stadium, Malé (A)	Maldives	1–2	2027 AFC Asian Cup qualification	Bakhito	500	
93	2 June 2026	Hassanal Bolkiah National Stadium, Bandar Seri Begawan (A)	Brunei	3–0	2026 ASEAN Championship qualification	Rangel, Zenivio, Da Silva	2,186	
94	9 June 2026	Kuala Lumpur Stadium, Kuala Lumpur (H) (Note: Timor-Leste played their home game in Kuala Lumpur, Malaysia due to the lack of a suitable venue in Timor-Leste.)	Brunei	3–1	2026 ASEAN Championship qualification	Cruz, Osorio, Da Silva	250	
95	24 July 2026	Chonburi Stadium, Chonburi (H) (Note: Timor-Leste played their home game in Chonburi, Thailand due to the lack of a suitable venue in Timor-Leste.)	Vietnam	0–7	2026 ASEAN Championship			
96	27 July 2026	Jalan Besar Stadium, Kallang (A)	Singapore	0–2	2026 ASEAN Championship		4,665	
97	31 July 2026	(H)	Indonesia	–	2026 ASEAN Championship			
98	3 August 2026	Morodok Techo National Stadium, Phnom Penh (A)	Cambodia	–	2026 ASEAN Championship			

== Record by opponent ==
As of 30 September 2026

Team	Pld	W	D	L	GF	GA	GD	WPCT
Brunei	14	6	1	7	22	26	−4	42.86
Cambodia	12	1	3	8	20	30	−10	8.33
Chinese Taipei	6	0	0	6	3	17	−14	0.00
Hong Kong	2	0	0	2	3	11	−8	0.00
Indonesia	7	0	0	7	2	24	−22	0.00
Laos	7	1	0	6	9	18	−9	14.29
Lebanon	1	0	0	1	0	4	−4	0.00
Malaysia	8	0	1	7	5	25	−20	0.00
Maldives	2	1	0	1	2	2	0	50.00
Mongolia	4	3	0	1	9	4	+5	75.00
Myanmar	5	0	1	4	2	9	−7	0.00
Nepal	4	0	2	2	3	9	−6	0.00
Palestine	2	0	1	1	1	8	−7	0.00
Philippines	9	1	0	8	6	33	−27	11.11
Saudi Arabia	2	0	0	2	0	17	−17	0.00
Singapore	4	0	0	4	1	13	−12	0.00
Sri Lanka	1	0	0	1	2	3	−1	0.00
Thailand	4	0	0	4	0	27	−27	0.00
Tajikistan	2	0	0	2	0	6	−6	0.00
United Arab Emirates	2	0	0	2	0	9	−9	0.00
Vietnam	1	0	0	1	0	7	−7	0.00
Total	99	13	9	77	90	302	−212	13.13

Source: Results
