= Arrarte =

Arrarte is a surname that comes from the Basque language. Notable people with the surname include:

== People ==
- Nahuel Arrarte (born 1980), Argentine football manager and former player
- Pablo Arrarte (born 1980), Spanish sailor
- Tristan Arrarte (born 2008), East Timorese footballer
