= Mon Vanda =

Cambodian footballer

Personal information
- Full name: Mon Vanda
- Date of birth: 18 October 1997 (age 29)
- Place of birth: Phnom Penh, Cambodia
- Position: Striker

Team information
- Current team: MOI Kompong Dewa
- Number: 54

Senior career*
Years	Team	Apps	(Gls)
2018–2021	Boeung Ket		
2021–2022	Preah Khan Reach Svay Rieng	4	(0)
2023–2024	Kirivong Sok Sen Chey	16	(0)
2025–	MOI Kompong Dewa	34	(5)

International career^{‡}
2026–	Cambodia	3	(0)
- * Club domestic league appearances and goals as of 9 November 2026 (UTC) ‡ National team caps and goals as of 22 August 2026

Mon Vanda (born 18 October 1997) is a Cambodian professional footballer who plays as a striker for Cambodian Premier League club MOI Kompong Dewa and the Cambodia national football team.

== Club career ==
Vanda joined Preah Khan Reach Svay Rieng in 2021 after leaving Boeung Ket at the end of 2020 league season. In 2023, he joined another Cambodian side Kirivong Sok Sen Chey having made 16 appearances in the league and left the club at the end of 2023-24 season. He joined MOI Kompong Dewa in 2025 where he plays along with his brother Mon Rado.
