= Tum Makara =

Cambodian footballer

Personal information
- Full name: Tum Makara
- Date of birth: 25 January 2006 (age 20)
- Place of birth: Cambodia
- Height: 1.70 m (5 ft 7 in)
- Position: Left-back

Team information
- Current team: Angkor Tiger
- Number: 14

Youth career
- 2021–2024: Bati Academy

Senior career*
Years	Team	Apps	(Gls)
2025–	Angkor Tiger	45	(4)

International career^{‡}
2022	Cambodia U16		
2022–2024	Cambodia U19	4	(0)
2024	Cambodia U20	3	(0)
2025–	Cambodia U23	4	(0)
2026–	Cambodia	3	(0)
- * Club domestic league appearances and goals as of 9 November 2026 (UTC) ‡ National team caps and goals as of 16 September 2026 (UTC)

Tum Makara (born 25 January 2006) is a Cambodian professional footballer who plays as a Left-back for Cambodian Premier League club Angkor Tiger and the Cambodia national football team.

== Club career ==
Makara started his professional football career after joining Angkor Tiger on 10 January 2025 graduated from Bati Youth Football Academy.

== International career ==
Makara was selected to represent his country since youth level from U16 to U23. Makara made his senior debut in 2026 ASEAN Championship match against Indonesia national football team on 27 July 2026.
