= Tim Geypens =

Indonesian footballer (born 2005)

Personal information
- Full name: Tim Henri Victor Geypens
- Date of birth: 21 June 2005 (age 21)
- Place of birth: Oldenzaal, Netherlands
- Height: 1.82 m (6 ft 0 in)
- Positions: Left-back; winger

Team information
- Current team: Bali United
- Number: 22

Youth career
- 2021–2024: Twente

Senior career*
Years	Team	Apps	(Gls)
2024	Heracles	0	(0)
2024–2026	Emmen	43	(2)
2026–	Bali United	3	(0)

International career^{‡}
2024	Indonesia U20	5	(0)
2026–	Indonesia	3	(0)
- * Club domestic league appearances and goals as of 20 September 2026 ‡ National team caps and goals as of 7 August 2026

Tim Henri Victor Geypens (born 21 June 2005) is a professional footballer who plays as a left-back or winger for Super League club Bali United. Born in the Netherlands, he represents the Indonesia national team.

== Club career ==
=== Youth career ===
Geypens is a youth exponent from Twente. He played at various youth levels for the club until in 2024 he was named in the squad of Twente's affiliated club Heracles Almelo for the Eredivisie match against Ajax on 27 January 2024, although he did not get any playing time.

=== Emmen ===
Geypens signed his first professional contract with Emmen on 1 July 2024 agreeing a two-year deal with a three-year option. He made his Eerste Divisie debut at 10 August 2024 against Dordrecht replacing Djenahro Nunumete after 81 minutes in a 1–2 home defeat.

On 29 August 2025, Geypens scored his first goal for the club against Den Bosch in a 3–1 win.

=== Bali United ===
On 16 July 2026, Geypens left Emmen to sign for Indonesian Super League club Bali United.

== International career ==
Geypens is eligible to represent Indonesia through his maternal grandfather. In November 2024, Geypens confirmed that he had decided to represent Indonesia at international level. He was called up by Indra Sjafri to the Indonesia under-20 team participating in the 2024 Maurice Revello Tournament.

On 9 March 2026, Geypens received his first called up to the senior team under new coach John Herdman.

== Personal life ==
Born in the Netherlands, Geypens is of Indonesian descent.

On 8 February 2025, Geypens officially obtained Indonesian citizenship.

== Career statistics ==
=== Club ===
As of match played 20 September 2026

Appearances and goals by club, season and competition
Club	Season	League			National Cup		League cup		Continental		Other		Total	
Club	Season	Division	Apps	Goals	Apps	Goals	Apps	Goals	Apps	Goals	Apps	Goals	Apps	Goals
Heracles Almelo	2023–24	Eredivisie	0	0	0	0	–		–		0	0	0	0
Emmen	2024–25	Eerste Divisie	15	0	1	0	–		–		0	0	16	0
Emmen	2025–26	Eerste Divisie	28	2	1	0	–		–		0	0	29	2
Bali United	2026–27	Super League	3	0	-	-	1	0	–		0	0	3	0
Career total			46	2	2	0	1	0	0	0	0	0	48	2

=== International ===
As of match played 7 August 2026

Appearances and goals by national team and year
National team	Year	Apps	Goals
Indonesia	2026	3	0
Total		3	0

== See also ==
- List of Indonesia international footballers born outside Indonesia
