= Batbaatar Amgalanbat =

Mongolian footballer (born 2001)

Batbaatar Amgalanbat батбаатар амгаланбат
Personal information
- Date of birth: 21 January 2001 (age 25)
- Place of birth: Mongolia
- Position: Defensive midfielder

Team information
- Current team: Ulaanbaatar
- Number: 6

Youth career
- –2016: Kharaatsai
- 2016–2017: Puskás Akadémia

Senior career*
Years	Team	Apps	(Gls)
2017–2022	Kharaatsai		
2022–2023	Ulaanbaatar City		
2023–	Ulaanbaatar		

International career^{‡}
2023–	Mongolia	3	(0)
- * Club domestic league appearances and goals as of 14:25, 20 September 2023 (UTC) ‡ National team caps and goals as of 14:25, 20 September 2023 (UTC)

Batbaatar Amgalanbat (Mongolian: батбаатар амгаланбат; born 21 January 2001) is a Mongolian professional footballer who plays as a midfielder for FC Ulaanbaatar and the Mongolian national team.

== Club career ==
As a youth, Amgalanbat played for FC Kharaatsai. In 2016 he was one of four players chosen to spend at least a year in Hungary with Puskás Akadémia FC as part of a partnership between the club and the Mongolian Football Federation. While with Kharaatsai, Amgalanbat was also a member of the club's futsal side. In 2020 he captained the side to a third-place finish in the league.

During the summer 2022 transfer window, Amgalanbat left Kharaatsai and joined Ulaanbaatar City FC of the Mongolian Premier League.

== International career ==
Amgalanbat represented Mongolia in futsal in 2019 AFC U-20 Futsal Championship qualification, 2020 AFC Futsal Championship qualification, and 2022 AFC Futsal Asian Cup qualification.

Amgalanbat was called up to the senior football national team in June 2023 for the 2023 Intercontinental Cup in India. He made his debut in the team's opening match, an eventual 0–2 loss to the hosts. In its next match, Mongolia secured a surprise scoreless draw with Lebanon. Amgalanbat was named Man of the Match for his defensive performance and won a prize of ₹ 25,000.

== Career statistics ==
=== International ===
As of match played 15 June 2023

Mongolia
Year	Apps	Goals
2023	3	0
Total	3	0
