= Hikaru Mizuno =

Cambodian footballer

Personal information
- Full name: Hikaru Mizuno
- Date of birth: August 2, 1991 (age 35)
- Place of birth: Chiba, Japan
- Height: 1.78 m (5 ft 10 in)
- Positions: Defensive midfielder; defender

Team information
- Current team: Kirivong Sok Sen Chey
- Number: 8

Youth career
- Penya FC Barcelona Japan
- 2007–2009: Ichiritsu Funabashi High School

College career
Years	Team	Apps	(Gls)
2010–2013	Meiji University		

Senior career*
Years	Team	Apps	(Gls)
2014	FC Ryukyu	8	(0)
2015	Albirex Niigata (S)	27	(2)
2015–2016	Preah Khan Reach Svay Rieng	18	(0)
2017–2021	Boeung Ket		
2022–2026	Preah Khan Reach Svay Rieng	41	(7)
2023–2024	→ Kirivong Sok Sen Chey (loan)	15	(1)
2025–2026	→ Royal Cambodian Armed Forces (loan)	24	(0)
2026–	Kirivong Sok Sen Chey	7	(0)

International career^{‡}
2024–	Cambodia	12	(0)
Medal record
Men's football
Representing Cambodia
FIFA ASEAN Challenge Cup
Runner-up	2026 Hong Kong
- * Club domestic league appearances and goals as of 9 November 2026 ‡ National team caps and goals as of 19 August 2026

Hikaru Mizuno (水野 輝, Mizuno Hikaru; Khmer: ហុីការ៉ុ មីហ្ស៊ូណូ; born August 2, 1991) is a professional footballer who plays for Kirivong Sok Sen Chey. Born in Japan, he plays for the Cambodia national team.

== Club career ==
From 2015, Mizuno started playing in Cambodia. He first played for Preah Khan Reach Svay Rieng from 2015 to 2016 and then joined Boeung Ket in 2017, where he played until 2021.

== Personal life ==
After professionally playing in Cambodia for 8 years, Mizuno received Cambodia citizenship through naturalization on 11 July 2024.

== Honours ==
Boeung Ket

- Cambodian Premier League: 2017, 2020

Preah Khan Reach Svay Rieng

- Cambodian Premier League: 2024-25
