= Yem Devit =

Cambodian footballer

Personal information
- Full name: Yem Devit
- Date of birth: 3 November 2003 (age 23)
- Place of birth: Phnom Penh, Cambodia
- Height: 1.62 m (5 ft 4 in)
- Position: Striker

Team information
- Current team: Phnom Penh Crown
- Number: 11

Youth career
- Phnom Penh Crown

Senior career*
Years	Team	Apps	(Gls)
2022–	Phnom Penh Crown	73	(6)

International career^{‡}
2025	Cambodia U23	3	(1)
2026–	Cambodia	5	(0)
- * Club domestic league appearances and goals as of 9 November 2026 (UTC) ‡ National team caps and goals as of 19 August 2026

Yem Devit (born 3 November 2003) is a Cambodian professional footballer who plays as a striker for Cambodian Premier League club Phnom Penh Crown.

== Career ==
=== Phnom Penh Crown ===
On 27 April 2024, Devit scored his first league goal in the 2024-25 Cambodian Premier League against rival club Boeung Ket.

On 7 May 2025, Devit scored the winning goal to send his club to 2024–25 Hun Sen Cup final.

On 1 November 2025, Devit scored his first international club goal in 2025–26 AFC Challenge League group stage match against Tainan City from Chinese Taipei to secured knockout stage in this competition.

== International career ==
Devit was called up to the Cambodia U23 squad to compete in the 2026 AFC U-23 Asian Cup qualification. He scored his first goal for his country and the winning goal against Pakistan U23 on 6 September 2025.

He was called up to the Cambodia U22 team for the 2025 SEA Games but later withdrew due to Cambodian-Thai border conflict.

Devit made his senior debut on 4 June in a 4–0 win over Bhutan.

== Honours ==
Phnom Penh Crown

- Cambodian Premier League: 2022
- Hun Sen Cup: 2024–25
