= Alisher Mirzaev =

Cambodian footballer (born 1996)

Personal information
- Birth name: Alisher Mirzaev Umidovich
- Date of birth: 11 April 1996 (age 30)
- Place of birth: Tashkent, Uzbekistan
- Height: 1.80 m (5 ft 11 in)
- Position: Central midfielder

Team information
- Current team: MOI Kompong Dewa
- Number: 20

Youth career
- Pakhtakor

Senior career*
Years	Team	Apps	(Gls)
2015	Pakhtakor	0	(0)
2016–2017	Obod	24	(2)
2017	→ Navbahor Namangan (loan)	7	(0)
2018–2019	Surkhon Termez	?	(?)
2019	Alay Osh	7	(1)
2020–2021	Visakha	?	(2)
2021–2022	Prey Veng	?	(?)
2022	→ Visakha (loan)	18	(3)
2023–	Visakha	64	(2)
2025–	→ MOI Kompong Dewa (loan)	21	(1)

International career^{‡}
2011–2012	Uzbekistan U16	6	(1)
2026–	Cambodia	4	(0)
Medal record
Men's football
Representing Cambodia
FIFA ASEAN Challenge Cup
Runner-up	2026 Hong Kong
- * Club domestic league appearances and goals as of 9 November 2026 ‡ National team caps and goals as of 19 August 2026

Alisher Mirzaev Umidovich (Khmer: អាលីសឺរ មីរហ្សាវ; born 11 April 1996) is a professional footballer who plays as a central midfielder for Cambodian Premier League club MOI Kompong Dewa. Born in Uzbekistan, he plays for the Cambodia national team.

== International career ==
Mirzaev is a former youth international for Uzbekistan. He also holds Cambodian citizenship. On 13 November 2025, his request to switch international allegiance to Cambodia was approved by FIFA. He was called up for Cambodia on 25 May 2026 for friendly match against Bhutan and Hong Kong.

== Honours ==
Uzbekistan U16

- AFC U-16 Championship champion: 2012

Pakhtakor

- Uzbekistan Super League champion: 2015
