= Im Vakhim =

Cambodian footballer

Personal information
- Full name: Im Vakhim
- Date of birth: 28 November 2003 (age 22)
- Place of birth: Siem Reap, Cambodia
- Height: 1.75 m (5 ft 9 in)
- Position: Central defender

Team information
- Current team: Angkor Tiger
- Number: 4

Senior career*
Years	Team	Apps	(Gls)
2021–2023	Soltilo Angkor		
2023–	Angkor Tiger	81	(3)

International career^{‡}
2022	Cambodia U20	3	(0)
2023	Cambodia U23	3	(0)
2025–	Cambodia	4	(0)
- * Club domestic league appearances and goals as of 18 November 2026 ‡ National team caps and goals as of 18 November 2026

Im Vakhim (born 28 November 2003) is a Cambodian professional footballer who plays as a central defender for Cambodian Premier League club Angkor Tiger and the Cambodia national football team.

== Career ==
Vakhim signed for Angkor Tiger in 2023.

== International career ==
Vakhim made his first call up and made his senior debut in friendly match against Tajikistan national football team on 5 June 2025 came on as a substitute for in the 65th minute, replacing Bong Samuel. He was called up to represent his country in 2026 ASEAN Championship and scored an own goal against Vietnam national football team on 7 August 2026.
