= 2026 ASEAN Championship qualification =

Brunei	Timor-Leste
1	6
- on aggregate

First leg
Brunei	Timor-Leste
0	3
- Date: 2 June 2026
- Venue: Hassanal Bolkiah National Stadium, Bandar Seri Begawan, Brunei
- Referee: Ahmad A'Qashah (Singapore)
- Attendance: 2,186

Second leg
Timor-Leste	Brunei
3	1
- Date: 9 June 2026
- Venue: Kuala Lumpur Stadium, Kuala Lumpur, Malaysia
- Referee: Sivakorn Pu-Udom (Thailand)
- Attendance: 250

The 2026 ASEAN Championship qualification tournament was a football qualification process for the 2026 ASEAN Championship, the sixteenth edition of the ASEAN Championship. Brunei and Timor-Leste, the two lowest-performing teams, contested for a berth for the ASEAN Championship final tournament in two home-and-away matches. Both matches were played on 2 and 9 June 2026.

== Venues ==
(Brunei) Bandar Seri Begawan	(Malaysia) Kuala Lumpur
Hassanal Bolkiah National Stadium	Kuala Lumpur Stadium
Capacity: 28,000	Capacity: 18,000
2026 ASEAN Championship qualification is located in Malaysia

== Qualification ==
=== Summary ===
Team 1	Agg.	Team 2	1st leg	2nd leg
Brunei	1–6	Timor-Leste	0–3	1–3

=== Matches ===
2 June 2026
20:15 UTC+8

Brunei	0–3	Timor-Leste
	Report	Rangel 27'; Zenivio 43' (pen.); Oatnasio 90+2'

Hassanal Bolkiah National Stadium, Bandar Seri Begawan
Attendance: 2,186
Referee: Ahmad A'Qashah (Singapore)

9 June 2026
17:00 UTC+8

Timor-Leste	3–1	Brunei
Cruz 56'; Osorio 62'; Oatnasio 80'	Report	Azwan 43'

Kuala Lumpur Stadium, Kuala Lumpur (Malaysia)
Attendance: 250
Referee: Sivakorn Pu-Udom (Thailand)

East Timor won on 6–1 aggregate and qualified for the final tournament.

== Goalscorers ==
2 goals

- (Timor-Leste) Oatnasio da Silva

1 goal

- (Brunei) Azwan Ali Rahman
- (Timor-Leste) Claudio Osorio
- (Timor-Leste) João Rangel
- (Timor-Leste) Zenivio
- (Timor-Leste) Zion Cruz
