= João Varudo =

Portuguese footballer

Personal information
- Full name: João Manuel Jesus Varudo Afonso
- Date of birth: 6 June 1992 (age 34)
- Place of birth: Lisbon, Portugal
- Height: 1.83 m (6 ft 0 in)
- Position: Left-back

Team information
- Current team: Sintrense
- Number: 13

Youth career
- 2004–2005: Damaiense
- 2005–2007: Futsal
- 2007–2011: Outurela

Senior career*
Years	Team	Apps	(Gls)
2011–2012	Outurela		
2012–2013	Santo António Lisboa		
2013–2015	1º Dezembro	24	(0)
2015–2017	Oriental	30	(1)
2017	Doxa Katokopias	0	(0)
2018	Kingston City	23	(0)
2018–2021	Oriental	49	(5)
2021–2022	Amora	80	(0)
2022–2024	Atlético CP	51	(2)
2024–2025	Amora	6	(0)
2025–	Sintrense	5	(0)

International career^{‡}
2026–	Timor-Leste	2	(0)
- * Club domestic league appearances and goals as of 1 June 2026 ‡ National team caps and goals as of 24 July 2026

João Manuel Jesus Varudo Afonso (born 6 June 1992) simply João Varudo, is a professional footballer who plays as a left-back for Sintrense. Born in Portugal, he represents Timor-Leste at international level.

== Club career ==
On 23 September 2015, Varudo made his professional debut with Oriental in a 2015–16 Taça da Liga match against Estoril Praia.

== International career ==
In June 2026, Varudo was named in Timor-Leste's final squad for the 2026 ASEAN Championship. He make his debut in a 7–0 lost to Vietnam on 24 July 2026.
