= Yudai Ogawa =

Cambodian footballer

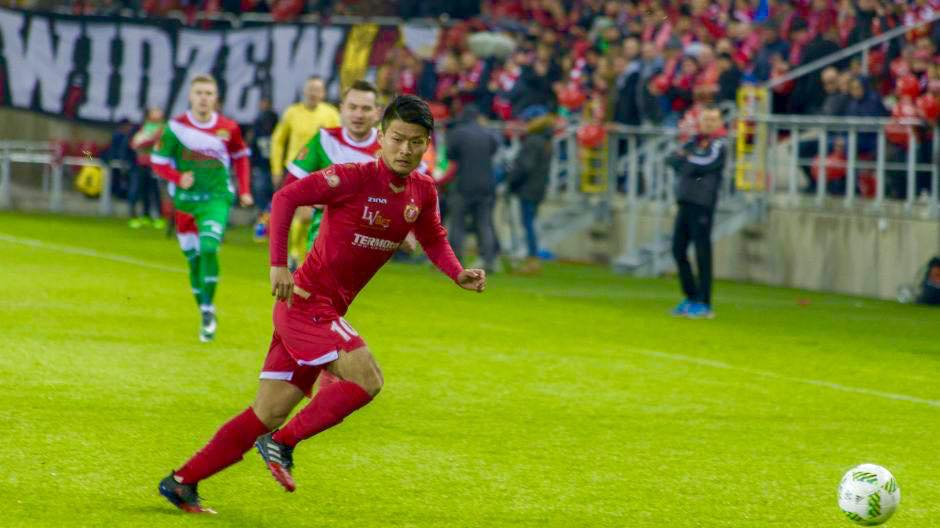
- Ogawa playing for Widzew Łódź in 2017

Personal information
- Full name: Yudai Ogawa
- Date of birth: 4 October 1996 (age 30)
- Place of birth: Kawasaki, Kanagawa, Japan
- Height: 1.73 m (5 ft 8 in)
- Position: Midfielder

Team information
- Current team: ISI Dangkor Senchey
- Number: 6

Youth career
- 2009–2011: FC Valie Tsuru
- 2012–2014: Yamanashi Gakuin High School

Senior career*
Years	Team	Apps	(Gls)
2015–2016	FC Gifu	3	(0)
2017	Widzew Łódź	3	(0)
2018	Tiffy Army	18	(10)
2019–2020	Angkor Tiger	14	(2)
2021–2025	Phnom Penh Crown	84	(19)
2025–2026	Preah Khan Reach Svay Rieng	25	(1)
2026–	ISI Dangkor Senchey	6	(0)

International career^{‡}
2023–	Cambodia	25	(2)
Medal record
Men's football
Representing Cambodia
FIFA ASEAN Challenge Cup
Runner-up	2026 Hong Kong
- * Club domestic league appearances and goals as of 10 November 2026 ‡ National team caps and goals as of 5 October 2026

Yudai Ogawa (小川 雄大, Ogawa Yudai; Khmer: យូឌៃ អូកាវ៉ា) (born 4 October 1996) is a professional footballer who plays as a midfielder for Cambodian Premier League club ISI Dangkor Senchey. Born in Japan, he plays for the Cambodia national team.

== Club career ==
=== FC Gifu ===
After graduating from Yamanashi Gakuin High School, Ogawa joined J2 League club FC Gifu in February 2015. He make 2015 season debut coming on as a substitution against Hokkaido Consadole Sapporo on 14 June 2015.

=== Widzew Łódź ===
On 8 February 2017, Ogawa joined Polish fourth-tier club Widzew Łódź. He made his league debut on 18 March 2017 in a league match against Motor Lubawa. However, he was released at the end of the season.

=== Tiffy Army ===
In January 2018, Ogawa moved to Cambodian Premier League club Tiffy Army. He went on to have a great season at the club scoring 10 goals in 18 appearances.

=== Angkor Tiger ===
On 16 January 2019, Ogawa moved to another Cambodian side Angkor Tiger.

=== Phnom Penh Crown ===
In January 2021, Ogawa moved to Cambodian giants Phnom Penh Crown. He make his debut for the club in a league match against Preah Khan Reach Svay Rieng on 15 July 2021 where he get an assist on his debut which resulted in a 3–3 draw.

Ogawa make his AFC Cup debut in a 4–3 loss to Singaporean side Hougang United on 24 June 2022. He would go on to score his first goal for the club in a 1–1 draw against Boeung Ket on 12 November 2022.

== International career ==
Ogawa acquired Cambodian citizenship in October 2023, making him eligible to represent the Cambodia national team. He made his debut for Cambodia on 12 October in a 2026 FIFA World Cup qualifier against Pakistan.

On 7 June 2024, Ogawa scored his first international goal in a 2–0 victory during the friendly match against Mongolia.

== Personal life ==
After professionally playing in Cambodia for 5 years, Ogawa received Cambodian citizenship through naturalization. In October 2023, Ogawa was called up to the Cambodia national team for a match against Pakistan in the 2026 FIFA World Cup qualification – AFC first round.

== International statistics ==
No.	Date	Venue	Opponent	Score	Result	Competition
1.	7 June 2024	Phnom Penh Olympic Stadium, Phnom Penh, Cambodia	Mongolia	1–0	2–0	Friendly
2.	9 June 2026	Phnom Penh Olympic Stadium, Phnom Penh, Cambodia	Hong Kong	1–0	2–0	Friendly

== Honours ==
Phnom Penh Crown

- Cambodian Premier League: 2021, 2022
- Hun Sen Cup: 2024–25
- Cambodian Super Cup: 2022, 2023
- Cambodian League Cup: 2022, 2023
