= Cambodia national football team =

Association football team

Cambodia
- Nickname(s): អ្នកចម្បាំងអង្គរ, Neak Chomreang Angkor (Angkor Warriors) គោព្រៃកម្ពុជា, Kouprey Kampuchea (Koupreys of Cambodia)
- Association: Football Federation of Cambodia (FFC)
- Confederation: AFC (Asia)
- Sub-confederation: AFF (Southeast Asia)
- Head coach: Koji Gyotoku
- Captain: Kan Mo
- Most caps: Soeuy Visal (86)
- Top scorer: Hok Sochetra (20)
- Home stadium: Phnom Penh Olympic Stadium; Morodok Techo National Stadium
- FIFA code: CAM
First colours	Second colours

FIFA ranking
- Current: 176 ▲1 (18 November 2026)
- Highest: 154 (9 March 2011)
- Lowest: 201 (14 August 2014)

First international
- Malaya 9–2 Cambodia (Kuala Lumpur, Malaya; 17 March 1956)

Biggest win
- Cambodia 8–0 North Yemen (Phnom Penh, Cambodia; 29 November 1966)

Biggest defeat
- Iran 14–0 Cambodia (Tehran, Iran; 10 October 2019)

Asian Cup
- Appearances: 1 (first in 1972)
- Best result: Fourth place (1972)

ASEAN Championship
- Appearances: 10 (first in 1996)
- Best result: Group stage (1996, 2000, 2002, 2004, 2008, 2016, 2018, 2020, 2022, 2024, 2026)

ASEAN Challenge Cup
- Appearances: 1 (first in 2026)
- Best result: Runners-up (2026)
Medal record
Men's football
FIFA ASEAN Challenge Cup
Silver medal – second place	2026 Hong Kong	Team
- Website: https://the-ffc.org

The Cambodia men's national football team (Khmer: ក្រុមបាល់ទាត់ជម្រើសជាតិកម្ពុជា, Krŏm Băltoăt Chômreus Chéatĕ Kâmpŭchéa [krom ɓal.ˈtŏət cum.ˈrəːh ciət kam.pu.ciə]) represents Cambodia in association football. It is affiliated with the Asian Football Confederation (AFC) and the regional ASEAN Football Federation (AFF). The team was founded in 1954 and is administered by the Football Federation of Cambodia (FFC).

== History ==
=== Formation ===
Cambodia formed its first national team following the end of French colonization in 1954. Immediately following the end of French colonialism, Cambodia played its first home game against Malaya in 1956. The game ended with a 9–2 win for the Malayans.

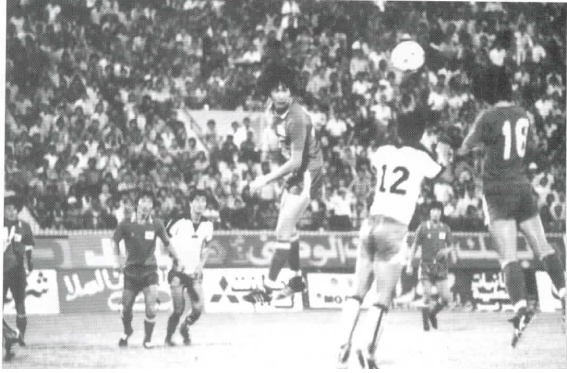
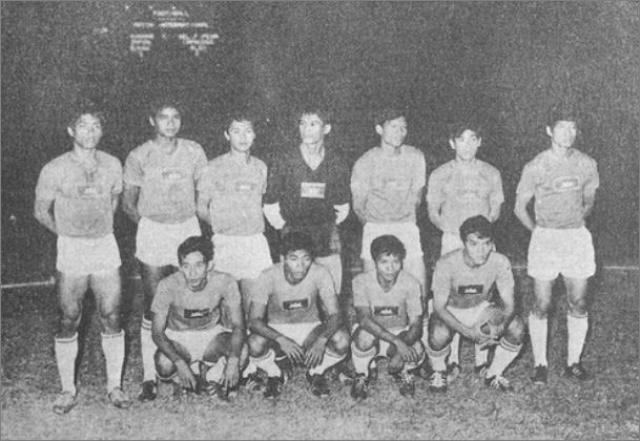
The Khmer Republic team won fourth place at the 1972 AFC Asian Cup.

Like most Asian countries at the time, Cambodia did not seek to participate in the FIFA World Cup qualification nor even AFC Asian Cup qualification, as the country was still trying to consolidate its early association football development. When Lon Nol decided to topple the Cambodian Kingdom and replaced by a Republic, Cambodia finally decided to participate in the 1972 AFC Asian Cup qualification. Cambodia managed to qualify for the 1972 AFC Asian Cup in its first qualification attempt. Cambodia managed to win over Hong Kong, which sent the country to Thailand.

In the tournament as Khmer Republic, Cambodia lost to Iran and had to play in group B along with South Korea and Kuwait. Despite early loss to the South Koreans, they had qualified to the semi-finals thanked for a 4–0 win over Kuwait, only got beaten later by Iran, again, and Thailand, and won the 4th place overall.

=== 1990s to 2010s ===
After decades of war, in which witnessed both Khmer Rouge's genocide and the later Vietnamese invasion which toppled the Khmer Rouge, Cambodia returned to international association football in 1993. Cambodia's first tournament as a new team was the 1996 AFF Championship, in which Cambodia was defeated in all four matches. In successive tournaments, Cambodia was not as successful and they could not manage to play with high spirits as it used to be. Despite this, Cambodia still gave birth to what would one of Cambodia's association football talents in its initial history, Hok Sochetra.

During this time, Cambodia sent its national team to the 1998 FIFA World Cup qualification, the first time Cambodia had ever done so. It had been unsuccessful by large, and often got eliminated in the bottom of their group. The country also withdrew from participating in the 2006 FIFA World Cup qualification. Likewise, Cambodia also only participated in the 2000 AFC Asian Cup qualification, before withdrew from 2004 and 2007 qualification attempts. The country later suffered AFF Championship drought, failing to qualify for three consecutive tournaments.

=== 2010s and 2020s ===

Cambodia's starting line-up in the 3–1 win against Laos at the 2018 AFF Championship group stage.

Cambodia's association football has witnessed resurgence after decades being under shadows. The resurgence of Cambodia had begun with the arrival of South Korean Lee Tae-hoon, who had introduced development of association football in the country, with the change of its tactics, as well as youth development and promotion of Cambodian youngsters to the national team, has given hopes of change. At this team, the team has a lot of young talents, notably Chan Vathanaka, the first ever Cambodian to play professional association football outside Cambodia, and the fanbase increased as for the achievement. Cambodia once again demonstrated a full spirit of association football, despite during the 2018 FIFA World Cup qualifying stage, they did not win and also missed out the 2012 and 2014 AFC Challenge Cups, thus missing out in the 2015 AFC Asian Cup.

During 2019 AFC Asian Cup qualification, Cambodia finished bottom in a group where they suffered losses to Jordan and neighbour Vietnam. It defeated Afghanistan, ranked 158 in that time, above Cambodia which was ranked 174, and had already defeated Cambodia twice in the World Cup qualification, 1–0 at home. It was the country's only win in the qualification.

Following its failure to qualify for the 2019 AFC Asian Cup, Cambodia participated in the 2022 FIFA World Cup qualification first round where it beat Pakistan 4–1 on aggregate over two legs to reach the second round being drawn with Hong Kong, Bahrain, Iraq and Iran. On 5 September 2019 in the first fixture, Cambodia obtained a 1–1 draw at home to Hong Kong, 5 days later, it lost against Bahrain 1–0.

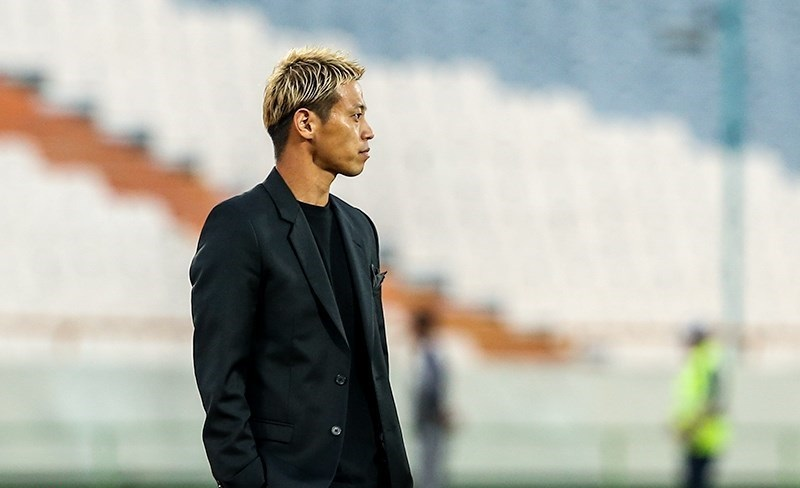
Keisuke Honda served as Cambodia's head coach from 2018 to 2023.

In August 2020, Félix Dalmás left his post after completing his contract while on 7 April 2021, fellow countrymen, Ryu Hirose was unveiled as the new head coach of the Cambodia taking the team whenever manager Keisuke Honda is unavailable. Hirose’s task was to guide Cambodia for the remaining matches of the second round qualifiers of the FIFA 2022 World Cup qualification. Cambodia went on to undergo 2 defeats to Iran, their worst ever defeat, 14–0 on 10 October 2019 and then 10–0 on 11 June 2021 seeing Cambodia picking up a solitary point in its group.

== Kit ==
From 2010 to 2021, the home kit was a blue and black shirt with black shorts and blue socks; while the original away kit was all white with a series of horizontal red stripes on the shirt. FBT sponsored this version of the kit.

On May 27, 2022, the team announced its new kit collection. The Khmer sportswear company, Varaman established in February 2022 sponsored them with designs by HCD football agency Clan United. The designs are based upon the flag of Cambodia, with the blue and red tones from the flag featured along with a pattern made from pixelated images of Angkor Wat. The 2022 home shirt uses a 3 toned blue digital camouflage design. The away shirt is all white fabric, with a zoomed in section of the pattern decorated in faint blue and red tones whilst being separated by patterns and shapes. To match each set, the goalkeeper kits are red and blue for home and away respectively. The repeated element is "slightly off-coloured" from the base fabric. The training kits are blue, red, and white with a graffiti styled pattern on each.

Cambodia national football team kits
Kit Provider	Period
(Thailand) FBT	2010–2021
(Cambodia) Varaman	2022–

== Stadium ==
Cambodia's home stadium is the Morodok Techo National Stadium with a capacity of 75,000, and associated facilities, was anticipated to be used to facilitate international friendly matches and regional qualifiers which was opened in August 2021 while their former home ground, the National Olympic Stadium will be second in line to host international matches.

Cambodia national football team home stadiums
Image	Stadium	Capacity	Location	Last match
	Morodok Techo National Stadium	60,000	Yongphat St., Phnom Penh	v Timor-Leste (3 August 2026; 2026 ASEAN Championship)
	National Olympic Stadium	30,000	Sangkat Boeng Prolit, Phnom Penh	v Hong Kong (9 June 2026; Friendly)

== Results and fixtures ==
The following is a list of match results in the last 12 months, and future matches that have been scheduled.

Win Draw Loss Fixture

=== 2026 ===
4 June Friendly	Cambodia	4–0	Bhutan	Phnom Penh, Cambodia
19:00 UTC+7	Rotana 7'; Coulibaly 39'; Dimong 69'; Rado 86'	Report		Stadium: Olympic Stadium; Referee: Tam Ping Wun (Hong Kong)

9 June Friendly	Cambodia	2–0	Hong Kong	Phnom Penh, Cambodia
19:00 UTC+7	Ogawa 45+1'; Chanthea 50'	Report		Stadium: Olympic Stadium; Attendance: 20,685; Referee: Yudi Nurcahya (Indonesia)

24 July 2026 ASEAN Championship	Cambodia	1–2	Singapore	Phnom Penh, Cambodia
19:00 UTC+7	Ouk 55'	Report	Shawal 22'; Ilhan Fandi 90+11'	Stadium: Morodok Techo National Stadium, Phnom Penh; Attendance: 27,790; Referee: Koji Takasaki (Japan)

27 July 2026 ASEAN Championship	Indonesia	5–1	Cambodia	Bogor, Indonesia
20:30 UTC+7	Baker 6', 15', 56'; Walsh 24'; Raven 86'	Report	Nadeo 48' (o.g.)	Stadium: Pakansari Stadium; Attendance: 22,485; Referee: Kim Woo-sung (South Korea)

3 August 2026 ASEAN Championship	Cambodia	3–0	Timor-Leste	Phnom Penh, Cambodia
17;30 UTC+7	Soknet 16', 63'; Rado 90'	Report		Stadium: Morodok Techo National Stadium; Attendance: 6,548; Referee: Zakaria Ismail (Malaysia)

7 August 2026 ASEAN Championship GS	Vietnam	3–1	Cambodia	Hanoi, Vietnam
20:00 UTC+7	Nguyễn Đình Bắc 18', 89'; Vakhim 84' (o.g.)	Report	Bento 71'	Stadium: Mỹ Đình National Stadium; Attendance: 19,628; Referee: Cheung Wai Lung Mario (Hong Kong)

27 September 2026 FIFA ASEAN Challenge Cup Group B	Cambodia	1–0	Myanmar	Kowloon, Hong Kong
18:00 UTC+8	Kakada 90+4'	Report		Stadium: Kai Tak Stadium; Referee: Wai Lun Wong

30 September 2026 FIFA ASEAN Challenge Cup Group B	Timor-Leste	2–2	Cambodia	Kowloon, Hong Kong
17:00 UTC+8	Pedro 17'; Lemos 58'	FIFA Report; GSA Report	Nieto 28', 38' (pen.)	Stadium: Kai Tak Stadium; Referee: Torphong Somsing (Thailand)

3 October 2026 FIFA ASEAN Challenge Cup Final	Hong Kong	2–0	Cambodia	Kai Tak, Hong Kong
18:00 UTC+8	Orr 41'; Camargo 58' (pen.)	FIFA Report		Stadium: Kai Tak Stadium; Attendance: 31,374; Referee: Sanzhar Zhakypbekov (Kyrgyzstan)

== Coaching staff ==
Position	Name
Head coach	(Japan) Koji Gyotoku
Team manager	(Cambodia) Chhouk Piseth
Assistant coach	(Cambodia) Khek Khemrin (Japan) Kento Fujihara
Goalkeeper coach	(Cambodia) Kheng Raksmey
Match analyst	(Cambodia) KIM LEABFONG
Doctor	(Cambodia) Lang Sobin
Physiotheraptist	(Cambodia) Seng Borey (Cambodia) Ry Lihour
Interpreter	(Cambodia) Khla Akon
Kit manager	(Cambodia) Lim Seaklay
Team staff	(Cambodia) Son Vuthy (Cambodia) Touch Phanouch

=== Coaching history ===
As of 9 June 2026

Name	Period	Matches	Wins	Draws	Losses
(Cambodia) Engly Bean	195? – 195?				
Azerie	195? – 195?				
(Czechoslovakia) František Kolman	1959 – 1962				
(Czechoslovakia) Josef Hagara	1962 – 1963				
(Czechoslovakia) František Kolman	1963 – 1965				
(Czechoslovakia) Vladimír Mirka	1965 – 1967				
(Cambodia) Prak Kimsan & Slaman Hasmat	1967 – 1975				
(West Germany) Joachim Fickert	June 1996 – January 2003	44	4	5	35
(Cambodia) Som Saran	2003 – June 2005	4	0	0	4
(Australia) Scott O'Donnell	July 2005 – December 2007	15	2	3	10
(South Korea) Yoo Kee-heung	December 2007 – July 2008	2	1	0	1
(Cambodia) Prak Sovannara	July 2008 – May 2009	12	3	1	8
(Australia) Scott O'Donnell	June 2009 – August 2010	0	0	0	0
(South Korea) Lee Tae-hoon	August 2010 – May 2012	10	3	2	5
(Cambodia) Hok Sochetra	July 2012 – October 2012	5	0	1	4
(Cambodia) Prak Sovannara	December 2012 – September 2013	2	0	0	2
(South Korea) Lee Tae-hoon	September 2013 – March 2017	35	13	2	20
(Japan) Kazunori Ohara (Interim)	April 2015	4	1	1	2
(Brazil) Leonardo Vitorino	March 2017 – October 2017	7	1	0	6
(Cambodia) Prak Sovannara (Interim)	October 2017 – August 2018	4	1	0	3
(Argentina) Félix Dalmás	August 2018 – August 2020	16	3	3	10
(Japan) Keisuke Honda (Note: Felix Dalmas and Ryu Hirose's results combined)	August 2018 – January 2023	34	9	4	21
(Japan) Ryu Hirose	March 2021 – January 2023	18	6	1	11
(Argentina) Félix Dalmás	March 2023 – September 2024	12	2	4	6
(Japan) Koji Gyotoku	September 2024 – present	16	5	2	9

== Players ==
=== Current squad ===
The following 23 players were called up for 2026 FIFA ASEAN Challenge Cup.

Caps and goals are correct as of 5 October 2026, after the match against Hong Kong.

No.	Pos.	Player	Date of birth (age)	Caps	Goals	Club
1	GK	Keo Soksela (Vice-captain)	1 August 1997 (age 29)	27	0	(Football Federation of Cambodia) Visakha
21	GK	Vireak Dara	30 October 2003 (age 23)	9	0	(Football Federation of Cambodia) PKR Svay Rieng
22	GK	Reth Lyheng	1 January 2004 (age 22)	2	0	(Football Federation of Cambodia) Nagaworld
2	DF	Choun Chanchav	5 May 1999 (age 27)	17	2	(Football Federation of Cambodia) Phnom Penh Crown
3	DF	Takaki Ose	19 October 1995 (age 31)	9	0	(Football Federation of Cambodia) PKR Svay Rieng
5	DF	Hikaru Mizuno	2 August 1991 (age 35)	12	0	(Football Federation of Cambodia) Kirivong Sok Sen Chey
12	DF	Ouk Sovann	15 May 1998 (age 28)	24	1	(Football Federation of Cambodia) Visakha
13	DF	Sareth Krya (Captain)	3 March 1996 (age 30)	43	2	(Football Federation of Cambodia) PKR Svay Rieng
18	DF	Phat Sokha	2 March 2003 (age 23)	5	0	(Football Federation of Cambodia) Nagaworld
20	DF	Cheng Meng	27 February 1998 (age 28)	31	0	(Football Federation of Cambodia) Visakha
23	DF	Sor Rotana	9 October 2002 (age 24)	20	2	(Football Federation of Cambodia) Visakha
4	MF	Alisher Mirzaev	11 April 1996 (age 30)	4	0	(Football Federation of Cambodia) MOI Kompong Dewa
6	MF	Yudai Ogawa	4 October 1996 (age 30)	25	2	(Football Federation of Cambodia) ISI Dangkor Senchey
7	MF	Iago Bento	15 January 1999 (age 27)	6	1	(Football Federation of Cambodia) Boeung Ket
8	MF	Bong Samuel	25 September 2005 (age 21)	13	1	(Football Federation of Cambodia) Phnom Penh Crown
11	MF	Sin Kakada	29 July 2000 (age 26)	15	1	(Football Federation of Cambodia) Visakha
15	MF	Min Ratanak	30 July 2002 (age 24)	18	3	(Football Federation of Cambodia) PKR Svay Rieng
16	MF	Kim Sokyuth	21 June 1999 (age 27)	14	0	(Football Federation of Cambodia) PKR Svay Rieng
9	FW	Sieng Chanthea	9 September 2002 (age 24)	51	9	(Football Federation of Cambodia) PKR Svay Rieng
10	FW	Andrés Nieto	29 April 1996 (age 30)	10	3	(Football Federation of Cambodia) Visakha
14	FW	Hav Soknet	3 August 2003 (age 23)	10	3	(Football Federation of Cambodia) Visakha
17	FW	Sa Ty	4 April 2002 (age 24)	28	2	(Football Federation of Cambodia) Phnom Penh Crown
19	FW	Nhean Sosidan	11 October 2002 (age 24)	19	1	(Football Federation of Cambodia) PKR Svay Rieng

=== Recent call-ups ===
The following players have been called up within the last 12 months.

Pos.	Player	Date of birth (age)	Caps	Goals	Club	Latest call-up
GK	Koy Salim	10 December 2002 (age 23)	1	0	(Cambodia) Boeung Ket	2026 ASEAN Championship
GK	Hul Kimhuy	7 April 2000 (age 26)	23	0	(Cambodia) ISI Dangkor Senchey	2026 ASEAN Championship
DF	Taing Bunchhai ^{INJ}	29 December 2002 (age 23)	3	0	(Cambodia) Boeung Ket	2026 ASEAN Championship
DF	Vann Vit	13 October 2003 (age 23)	0	0	(Cambodia) Life Sihanoukville	2026 ASEAN Championship
DF	Sophal Dimong	4 March 2001 (age 25)	5	1	(Cambodia) PKR Svay Rieng	2026 ASEAN Championship
DF	Nu Chenmakara	1 May 2002 (age 24)	0	0	(Cambodia) Angkor Tiger	2026 ASEAN Championship
DF	Tum Makara	25 January 2006 (age 20)	3	0	(Cambodia) Angkor Tiger	2026 ASEAN Championship
DF	Im Vakhim	28 November 2003 (age 22)	4	0	(Cambodia) Angkor Tiger	2026 ASEAN Championship
DF	Chea Sokmeng	26 November 2002 (age 23)	4	0	(Cambodia) Nagaworld	2026 ASEAN Championship
DF	Leng Nora	19 September 2004 (age 22)	6	0	(Cambodia) Visakha	v. Hong Kong, 4 June 2026
DF	Kan Mo ^{INJ}	24 September 1992 (age 34)	10	0	(Cambodia) ISI Dangkor Senchey	v. Hong Kong, 13 November 2025
MF	Sos Suhana	4 April 1992 (age 34)	81	4	(Cambodia) Nagaworld	2026 ASEAN Championship
MF	Sin Sovannmakara	6 December 2004 (age 21)	8	0	(Cambodia) Visakha	2026 ASEAN Championship
MF	Nick Taylor ^{INJ}	2 September 1998 (age 28)	23	1	(Thailand) PT Prachuap	v. Hong Kong, 13 November 2025
FW	Mon Rado ^{INJ}	27 January 2004 (age 22)	6	2	(Cambodia) MOI Kompong Dewa	2026 ASEAN Championship
FW	Mat Noron ^{INJ}	17 June 1998 (age 28)	15	0	(Cambodia) Boeung Ket	2026 ASEAN Championship
FW	Yem Devit	3 November 2003 (age 23)	5	0	(Cambodia) Phnom Penh Crown	2026 ASEAN Championship
FW	Abdel Kader Coulibaly	18 June 1993 (age 33)	9	3	(Malaysia) Melaka	2026 ASEAN Championship
FW	Mon Vanda	18 October 1997 (age 29)	3	0	(Cambodia) MOI Kompong Dewa	2026 ASEAN Championship
FW	Khoan Soben	8 October 2004 (age 22)	4	0	(Cambodia) Boeung Ket	v. Hong Kong, 13 November 2025
^{INJ} Withdrew due to injury^{PRE} Preliminary squad / standby^{RET} Retired from the national team^{SUS} Serving suspension^{WD} Withdrew due to non-injury issue.

=== Previous squads ===
AFC Asian Cup

- 1972 AFC Asian Cup squad

AFF Championship / ASEAN Championship

- 1996 AFF Championship squad
- 2000 AFF Championship squad
- 2002 AFF Championship squad
- 2004 AFF Championship squad
- 2008 AFF Championship squad
- 2016 AFF Championship squad
- 2018 AFF Championship squad
- 2020 AFF Championship squad
- 2022 AFF Championship squad
- 2024 ASEAN Championship squad

== Player records ==
As of 13 November 2025
Players in bold are still active with Cambodia.

=== Most appearances ===
Rank	Player	Caps	Goals	Career
1	**Soeuy Visal**	86	5	2014–present
2	**Sos Suhana**	79	4	2012–present
3	Kouch Sokumpheak	73	7	2006–2023
4	Keo Sokpheng	62	15	2015–2022
5	Prak Mony Udom	60	11	2011–2021
6	Chhin Chhoeun	56	4	2011–2018
7	Khoun Laboravy	55	12	2008–2018
8	Chan Vathanaka	52	19	2013–2023
9	**Thierry Bin**	51	3	2015–present
10	Sam El Nasa	46	11	2000–2011

=== Top goalscorers ===
Rank	Player	Goals	Caps	Ratio	Career
1	Hok Sochetra	20	26	0.77	1995–2003
2	Chan Vathanaka	19	52	0.37	2013–2023
3	Keo Sokpheng	15	62	0.24	2015–2022
4	Khoun Laboravy	12	55	0.22	2008–2018
5	Sam El Nasa	11	46	0.24	2000–2011
5	Prak Mony Udom	11	60	0.18	2011–2021
7	Khim Borey	10	28	0.36	2007–2015
8	**Sieng Chanthea**	8	44	0.18	2019–present
9	Kouch Sokumpheak	7	73	0.1	2006–2023
10	Sok Chanraksmey	5	10	0.5	2013–2016
10	Reung Bunheing	5	19	0.26	2018–2023
10	Chan Rithy	5	25	0.2	2002–2011
10	**Soeuy Visal**	5	86	0.06	2014–present

== Competitive record ==
=== FIFA World Cup ===
FIFA World Cup record		Qualification record					
Year	Round	Pld	W	D	L	GF	GA
(Uruguay) 1930	Part of France						
(Italy) 1934	Part of France						
(France) 1938	Part of France						
(Brazil) 1950	Part of France						
(Switzerland) 1954	Did not enter						
(Sweden) 1958	Did not enter						
(Chile) 1962	Did not enter						
(England) 1966	Did not enter						
(Mexico) 1970	Did not enter						
(West Germany) 1974	Did not enter						
(Argentina) 1978	Did not enter						
(Spain) 1982	Did not enter						
(Mexico) 1986	Did not enter						
(Italy) 1990	Did not enter						
(United States) 1994	Did not enter						
(France) 1998	Did not qualify	6	0	1	5	2	27
(South Korea) (Japan) 2002	Did not qualify	6	0	1	5	2	22
(Germany) 2006	Did not enter						
(South Africa) 2010	Did not qualify	2	0	0	2	1	5
(Brazil) 2014	Did not qualify	2	1	0	1	6	8
(Russia) 2018	Did not qualify	10	1	1	8	5	28
(Qatar) 2022	Did not qualify	10	2	1	7	6	45
(Canada) (Mexico) (United States) 2026	Did not qualify	2	0	1	1	0	1
(Morocco) (Portugal) (Spain) 2030	To be determined						
(Saudi Arabia) 2034	To be determined						
Total	0/7	38	4	5	29	22	136

=== AFC Asian Cup ===
AFC Asian Cup record									Qualification record					
Year	Round	Position	Pld	W	D	L	GF	GA	Pld	W	D	L	GF	GA
(Hong Kong) 1956	Did not qualify								2	1	0	1	5	11
(South Korea) 1960	Withdrew								Withdrew					
(Israel) 1964	Withdrew								Withdrew					
(Iran) 1968	Did not qualify								3	2	0	1	4	2
(Thailand) 1972	Fourth place	4th	4	1	1	2	8	10	5	2	1	2	8	8
(Iran) 1976	Did not enter								Did not enter					
1980	Did not enter								Did not enter					
(Singapore) 1984	Did not enter								Did not enter					
1988	Did not enter								Did not enter					
(Japan) 1992	Did not enter								Did not enter					
(United Arab Emirates) 1996	Did not enter								Did not enter					
(Lebanon) 2000	Did not qualify								4	0	0	4	4	19
(China) 2004	Did not enter								Did not enter					
(Indonesia) (Malaysia) (Thailand) (Vietnam) 2007	Did not enter								Did not enter					
(Qatar) 2011	Did not qualify								AFC Challenge Cup					
(Australia) 2015	Did not qualify								AFC Challenge Cup					
(United Arab Emirates) 2019	Did not qualify								18	3	2	13	12	47
(Qatar) 2023	Did not qualify								15	4	2	9	11	53
(Saudi Arabia) 2027	Did not qualify								2	0	1	1	2	2
Total	Fourth place	1/19	5	1	1	3	8	10	49	12	6	31	46	142

=== AFC Challenge Cup ===
AFC Challenge Cup record
Year	Round	Pld	W	D	L	GF	GA
(Bangladesh) 2006	Group stage	3	1	0	2	4	6
(India) 2008	Did not qualify						
(Sri Lanka) 2010	Did not qualify						
(Nepal) 2012	Did not qualify						
(Maldives) 2014	Did not qualify						
Total	Group stage	3	1	0	2	4	6

=== ASEAN Championship ===
ASEAN Championship record									Qualification record					
Year	Round	Pos	Pld	W	D	L	GF	GA	Pld	W	D	L	GF	GA
(Singapore) 1996	Group stage	9th	4	0	0	4	1	12	No qualification					
(Vietnam) 1998	Did not qualify								2	0	1	1	1	4
(Thailand) 2000	Group stage	7th	4	1	0	3	5	10	No qualification					
(Indonesia) (Singapore) 2002	Group stage	7th	4	1	0	3	5	18	No qualification					
(Malaysia) (Vietnam) 2004	Group stage	10th	4	0	0	4	2	22	No qualification					
(Singapore) (Thailand) 2007	Did not qualify								4	1	2	1	7	5
(Indonesia) (Thailand) 2008	Group stage	7th	3	0	0	3	2	12	4	2	1	1	9	8
(Indonesia) (Vietnam) 2010	Did not qualify								3	1	2	0	4	2
(Malaysia) (Thailand) 2012	Did not qualify								4	0	0	4	3	12
(Singapore) (Vietnam) 2014	Did not qualify								4	2	0	2	6	6
(Myanmar) (Philippines) 2016	Group stage	8th	3	0	0	3	4	8	3	3	0	0	8	3
(ASEAN) 2018	Group stage	8th	4	1	0	3	4	9	Qualified automatically					
(Singapore) 2020	Group stage	7th	4	1	0	3	6	11	Qualified automatically					
(ASEAN) 2022	Group stage	6th	4	2	0	2	10	8	Qualified automatically					
(ASEAN) 2024	Group stage	6th	4	1	1	2	7	8	Qualified automatically					
(ASEAN) 2026	Group stage	8th	4	1	0	3	6	10	Qualified automatically					
Total	Group stage	11/16	42	8	1	33	52	128	24	9	6	9	38	40

=== FIFA ASEAN Challenge Cup ===
FIFA ASEAN Challenge Cup record
Year	Round	Position	Pld	W	D	L	GF	GA
(Hong Kong) 2026	Runners-up	2nd	3	1	1	1	3	4

== Head-to-head record ==
Last match updated was against Hong Kong on 3 October 2026.

Including results from the Khmer Republic.

Key
More wins than losses
As many wins as losses
Fewer wins than losses

Cambodia national football team head-to-head records
Opponent	First	Last	Pld	W	D	L	GF	GA	GD	Confederation
Afghanistan	2015	2022	5	1	1	3	4	8	−4	AFC
Aruba	2025	2025	1	0	0	1	1	2	−1	CONCACAF
Australia	1965	1965	1	0	1	0	0	0	0	AFC
Bahrain	2019	2021	2	0	0	2	0	9	−9	AFC
Bangladesh	2006	2023	6	0	1	5	2	7	−5	AFC
Bhutan	2015	2026	2	2	0	0	6	0	+6	AFC
Brunei	1997	2022	9	6	2	1	27	10	+17	AFC
China	1963	2001	6	0	0	6	3	24	−21	AFC
Chinese Taipei	1964	2024	5	3	1	1	9	8	+1	AFC
Equatorial Guinea	2024	2024	1	0	0	1	0	2	−2	CAF
Guam	2006	2021	4	3	0	1	6	3	+3	AFC
Guinea	1965	1965	1	0	0	1	1	2	−1	CAF
Guyana	2024	2024	1	0	0	1	1	4	−3	CONCACAF
Hong Kong	1957	2026	14	3	3	8	13	28	−15	AFC
India	1964	2022	5	1	0	4	5	17	−12	AFC
Indonesia	1965	2026	26	2	3	21	18	97	−79	AFC
Iran	1972	2021	4	0	0	4	1	28	−27	AFC
Iraq	2019	2021	2	0	0	2	1	8	−7	AFC
Japan	1970	2015	4	0	0	4	1	10	−9	AFC
Jordan	2017	2017	2	0	0	2	0	8	−8	AFC
Kuwait	1972	1972	1	1	0	0	4	0	+4	AFC
Kyrgyzstan	2007	2011	2	0	0	2	6	8	−2	AFC
Laos	1971	2021	17	8	3	6	30	24	+6	AFC
Lebanon	1998	1998	1	0	0	1	1	5	−4	AFC
Macau	2008	2023	7	5	1	1	18	7	+11	AFC
Malaysia (Note: Includes matches against Malaya.)	1956	2024	32	4	5	23	33	95	−62	AFC
Maldives	2001	2016	4	0	1	3	3	14	−11	AFC
Mongolia	2019	2024	3	1	1	1	4	3	+1	AFC
Myanmar	1957	2026	22	4	2	16	15	58	-43	AFC
Nepal	2008	2008	1	0	0	1	0	1	−1	AFC
North Korea	1965	1966	2	0	0	2	0	6	−6	AFC
Pakistan	1967	2023	5	3	1	1	5	2	+3	AFC
Palestine	1966	2006	2	1	0	1	4	4	0	AFC
Philippines	1972	2022	12	4	4	4	14	20	−6	AFC
Qatar	2023	2023	1	0	0	1	0	3	−3	AFC
Saudi Arabia	2017	2017	1	0	0	1	2	7	−5	AFC
Singapore	1957	2026	20	2	1	17	13	42	−29	AFC
South Korea	1971	1974	7	1	0	6	4	22	−18	AFC
Sri Lanka	1972	2024	5	2	2	1	12	4	+8	AFC
Syria	2007	2016	3	0	0	3	1	17	−16	AFC
Tajikistan	2011	2025	2	0	0	2	1	5	−4	AFC
Thailand	1957	2024	17	2	5	10	20	42	−22	AFC
Timor-Leste	2006	2026	11	7	3	1	28	19	+9	AFC
Turkmenistan	2007	2013	3	0	0	3	1	12	−11	AFC
Uzbekistan	1997	1997	2	0	0	2	1	10	−9	AFC
Vietnam (Note: Includes matches against South Vietnam and North Vietnam.)	1956	2026	19	3	3	13	22	63	−41	AFC
Yemen (Note: Includes matches against North Yemen.)	1966	1997	3	1	0	2	8	8	0	AFC
46 Countries	1956	2026	301	67	44	190	340	772	–432	FIFA

=== Regional record ===
Last meet up against Southeast Asia countries
Opponents	Score	Year	Outcome	Match type
Brunei	15 December 2022	5−1	Won	2022 AFF Championship
Indonesia	27 July 2026	1−5	Lost	2026 ASEAN Championship
Laos	15 December 2021	3−0	Won	2020 AFF Championship
Malaysia	8 December 2024	2−2	Draw	2024 ASEAN Championship
Myanmar	27 September 2026	1−0	Won	2026 FIFA ASEAN Cup
Philippines	20 December 2022	3−2	Won	2022 AFF Championship
Singapore	24 July 2026	1−2	Lost	2026 ASEAN Championship
Thailand	20 December 2024	2−3	Lost	2024 ASEAN Championship
Timor-Leste	30 September 2026	2−2	Draw	2026 FIFA ASEAN Cup
Vietnam	7 August 2026	1−3	Lost	2026 ASEAN Championship

== Honours ==
=== Regional ===
- FIFA ASEAN Challenge Cup
  - (silver) Runners-up (1): 2026

=== Friendly ===
- South Vietnam Independence Cup
  - (gold) Champions (1): 1972
- Jakarta Anniversary Tournament
  - (bronze) Third place (1): 1972
  - Fourth place (1): 1971
- Korea Cup
  - (gold) Champions (1): 1973
  - Fourth place (1):1974
- King Cup(Thailand)
  - Fourth place (1):1974
