= Sophal Dimong =

Cambodian footballer

Personal information
- Full name: Sophal Dimong
- Date of birth: 4 March 2001 (age 25)
- Place of birth: Siem Reap, Cambodia
- Height: 1.75 m (5 ft 9 in)
- Positions: Central midfielder; central defender

Team information
- Current team: Preah Khan Reach Svay Rieng
- Number: 35

Senior career*
Years	Team	Apps	(Gls)
2021–2025	Angkor Tiger		
2025–	Preah Khan Reach Svay Rieng	30	(1)

International career^{‡}
2023	Cambodia U23		
2025–	Cambodia	5	(1)
- * Club domestic league appearances and goals as of 9 November 2026 ‡ National team caps and goals as of 19 August 2026

Sophal Dimong (born 4 March 2001) is a Cambodian professional footballer who plays as a central midfielder or central defender for Cambodian Premier League club Preah Khan Reach Svay Rieng.

== Career ==
He signed for Preah Khan Reach Svay Rieng in July 2025 after leaving Angkor Tiger at the end of 2024-25 Cambodian Premier League.

== International career ==
Dimong made his senior debut in a friendly match against Hong Kong on 13 November 2025.

== Career statistics ==
As of match played 13 November 2025

Appearances and goals by national team and year
National team	Year	Apps	Goals
Cambodia	2025	1	0
Total		1	0

=== International goals ===
No.	Date	Venue	Opponent	Score	Result	Competition
1.	4 June 2026	Phnom Penh Olympic Stadium, Phnom Penh, Cambodia	Bhutan	3–0	4–0	Friendly
