= João Rangel =

Timorese footballer (born 2001)

Personal information
- Full name: João António Soares Rangel
- Date of birth: 17 July 2001 (age 25)
- Place of birth: Vila Franca de Xira, Portugal
- Height: 1.70 m (5 ft 7 in)
- Position: Midfielder

Team information
- Current team: Leiston

Youth career
- 2009–2017: Norwich City
- 2017–2019: Barnsley
- 2018–2019: → Mansfield Town (loan)

Senior career*
Years	Team	Apps	(Gls)
2019–2020	Académica B		
2020–2021	A.D. Nogueirense		
2021	Gainsborough Trinity		
2021–2022	Pontefract Collieries	19	(1)
2022–2023	Kings Lynn Town		
2022	→ Wisbech Town (loan)		
2022	→ Barton Town (loan)		
2023	Gorleston		
2023–2024	Wroxham	3	(1)
2024–2025	Lowestoft Town	37	(7)
2025–	Leiston	35	(8)

International career^{‡}
2025–	Timor-Leste	5	(2)
- * Club domestic league appearances and goals as of 14:00, 12 February 2026 (UTC) ‡ National team caps and goals as of 14:00, 12 February 2026 (UTC)

João António Soares Rangel (born 17 July 2001) is a semi-professional footballer who plays as a midfielder for Southern League Premier Division Central club Leiston. Born in Portugal, he represents the Timor-Leste national team.

== Career ==
Rangel signed for Northern Premier League Premier Division side Gainsborough Trinity on 10 August 2021. Rangel played for Northern Premier League Division One East side Pontefract Collieries during the 2021–22 season. João signed for Kings Lynn Town on 28 September 2022. Rangel signed for Barton Town on loan on 22 November 2022. João signed for Gorleston for the remainder of the season on 6 March 2023, following the termination of his Kings Lynn Town contract. Rangel signed for Lowestoft Town on 2 September 2024. Rangel signed for Southern League Premier Division Central side Leiston on 25 June 2025. João made his debut for Leiston on 9 August 2025, in the opening day of the 2025–26 Southern League Premier Division Central season, scoring and assisting in 2-2 draw.

== International career ==
=== Timor-Leste ===
Rangel made his debut for Timor-Leste on in a 2027 AFC Asian Cup qualification fixture at home to the Philippines on 9 October 2025, João came on as a 60th minute substitute for Mouzinho, Philippines ran out 4-1 winners. Rangel scored his first goal for Timor-Leste during his second match, the reverse fixture against the Philippines on 14 October 2025, João scored what turned out to be a consolation for Timor-Leste in the added on time in the first half, it actually gave Timor-Leste the lead in the match, but they eventually went on to lose 3-1, with Rangel later been substituted for João Pedro on the 82nd minute.

== Career statistics ==
=== Club ===
As of match played 7 February 2026

Club	Season	Division	League		FA Cup		League Cup		Other		Total	
Club	Season	Division	Apps	Goals	Apps	Goals	Apps	Goals	Apps	Goals	Apps	Goals
Pontefract Collieries	2021–22	Northern Premier League Division One East	19	1	0	0	—		2 (Note: One Appearance in FA Trophy) (Note: One Appearance in West Riding County Cup)	0	21	1
Wroxham	2024–25	Isthmian League North Division	3	1	3	1	—		0	0	6	2
Lowestoft Town	2024–25	Southern League Premier Central	37	7	0	0	—		2 (Note: One Appearance in FA Trophy) (Note: One Appearance in Suffolk Premier Cup)	0	39	7
Leiston	2025–26	Southern League Premier Central	27	7	3	0	—		2 (Note: One Appearance in Suffolk Premier Cup) (Note: One Appearance in FA Trophy)	0	31	6
Career total			143	34	9	2	0	0	11	3	163	39

=== International ===
List of international goals scored by João Rangel
No.	Date	Venue	Opponent	Score	Result	Competition
1	14 October 2025	New Clark City Stadium, Capas, Philippines	Philippines	1–1	1–3	2027 AFC Asian Cup qualification
2	2 June 2026	Hassanal Bolkiah National Stadium, Bandar Seri Begawan, Brunei	Brunei	1–0	3–0	2026 ASEAN Championship qualification
