= Ouk Sovann =

Cambodian footballer (born 1998)

Personal information
- Full name: Ouk Sovann
- Date of birth: 15 May 1998 (age 28)
- Place of birth: Pursat, Cambodia
- Height: 1.75 m (5 ft 9 in)
- Positions: Centre-back; right-back

Team information
- Current team: Visakha
- Number: 27

Youth career
- 2011–2015: Phnom Penh Crown

Senior career*
Years	Team	Apps	(Gls)
2015–2018	Phnom Penh Crown		
2019–	Visakha		

International career^{‡}
2016	Cambodia U19		
2019	Cambodia U22		
2018–	Cambodia	24	(1)
Medal record
Men's football
Representing Cambodia
FIFA ASEAN Challenge Cup
Runner-up	2026 Hong Kong
- * Club domestic league appearances and goals as of 20:12, 8 June 2021 (UTC) ‡ National team caps and goals as of 22:30, 5 October 2026 (UTC)

Ouk Sovann (Khmer: អ៊ុក សុវណ្ណ [ʔuk soʋan]; born 15 May 1998) is a Cambodian professional footballer who plays as a centre-back or a right-back for Cambodian Premier League club Visakha and the Cambodia national team

== Career statistics ==
=== International ===
As of matches played 5 October 2026.

National team	Year	Apps	Goals
Cambodia	2019	6	0
Cambodia	2021	3	0
Cambodia	2022	1	0
Cambodia	2023	1	0
Cambodia	2024	2	0
Cambodia	2025	2	0
Cambodia	2026	7	1
Total		24	1

=== International goals ===
No	Date	Venue	Opponent	Score	Result	Competition
1	24 July 2026	Morodok Techo National Stadium, Phnom Penh, Cambodia	Singapore	1–1	1–2	2026 ASEAN Championship
