= Oatnasio da Silva =

East Timorese footballer (born 2006)

Personal information
- Full name: Oatnasio da Silva Guterres
- Date of birth: 11 June 2006 (age 20)
- Place of birth: Timor-Leste
- Positions: Full-back; right midfielder; forward

Team information
- Current team: Portadown

Youth career
- 2025–: Portadown

Senior career*
Years	Team	Apps	(Gls)
2023–2025	Loughgall	6	(0)
2025–	Portadown	0	(0)

International career^{‡}
2025–	Timor-Leste U22	2	(0)
2025–	Timor-Leste U23	3	(1)
2026–	Timor-Leste	7	(2)
- * Club domestic league appearances and goals as of 23:38, 23 October 2026 (UTC) ‡ National team caps and goals as of 23:38, 23 October 2026 (UTC)

Oatnasio da Silva Guterres (born 11 June 2006) is an East Timorese footballer who plays as a full-back, right midfielder, and forward for NIFL Premiership side Portadown and the Timor-Leste national team.

== Club career ==
Da Silva made his debut for Northern Irish club Loughgall, where he made six appearances in the NIFL Premiership. In June 2025, he signed for Portadown, where he primarily plays for the club's NIFL Premiership Development League team.

== International career ==
In 2025, da Silva was called up to Timor-Leste's under-23 national team for the 2025 SEA Games.

In June 2026, he was called up to the Timor-Leste national team for the 2026 ASEAN Championship and it's qualification tournament. During the first leg of qualification against Brunei, he scored on his debut in a 3–0 win, before scoring again in their 3–1 win in the second leg. Later that year, he was included in Timor-Leste's squad for the 2026 FIFA ASEAN Cup.
