= Iago Bento =

Cambodian footballer (born 1999)

Personal information
- Full name: Iago Bento Fernandes
- Date of birth: 15 January 1999 (age 27)
- Place of birth: Macaé, Brazil
- Height: 1.70 m (5 ft 7 in)
- Position: Winger

Team information
- Current team: Boeung Ket
- Number: 7

Youth career
- 2013–2018: Atlético Mineiro
- 2018–2021: Coritiba

Senior career*
Years	Team	Apps	(Gls)
2021–2023	Angkor Tiger	19	(7)
2023–2024	Preah Khan Reach Svay Rieng	24	(3)
2024–	Boeung Ket	59	(10)

International career^{‡}
2026–	Cambodia	6	(1)
Medal record
Men's football
Representing Cambodia
FIFA ASEAN Challenge Cup
Runner-up	2026 Hong Kong
- * Club domestic league appearances and goals as of 9 November 2026 ‡ National team caps and goals as of 5 October 2026

Iago Bento Fernandes (born 15 January 1999), simply known as Iago, is a professional footballer who plays as a winger for Cambodian Premier League club Boeung Ket. Born in Brazil, he represents Cambodia at international level.

== Youth ==
At youth level, Bento was a left-back and joined Atlético Mineiro youth in 2013. In 2016, he won the Campeonato Mineiro Under-17, and in 2017 he won the Torneio de Terborg.

== Career ==
Bento started his professional career in 2021 with Cambodian Premier League club Angkor Tiger after leaving Coritiba youth in Brazil.

Bento joined Svay Rieng in 2023, where he won double trophies with the club both local league and domestic up during 2023–24 season.3 He left the club at the end of the 2023–24 season.

== International career ==
Bento was called up to the Cambodia national team for the 2026 ASEAN Championship in July 2026. He scored his first international goal on 7 August against Vietnam at the Mỹ Đình National Stadium.

== Career statistics ==
=== International ===
As of 5 October 2026

Appearances and goals by national team and year
National team	Year	Apps	Goals
Cambodia	2026	3	1
Total		3	1

Scores and results list Cambodia's goal tally first, score column indicates score after each Bento goal.

List of international goals scored by Iago Bento
No.	Date	Venue	Cap	Opponent	Score	Result	Competition
1	7 August 2026	Mỹ Đình National Stadium, Hanoi, Vietnam	3	Vietnam	1–1	1–3	2026 ASEAN Championship

== Honours ==
Preah Khan Reach Svay Rieng

- Cambodian Premier League Winner: 2023–24
- Hun Sen Cup Winner: 2023–24
