= Zenivio =

East Timorese footballer

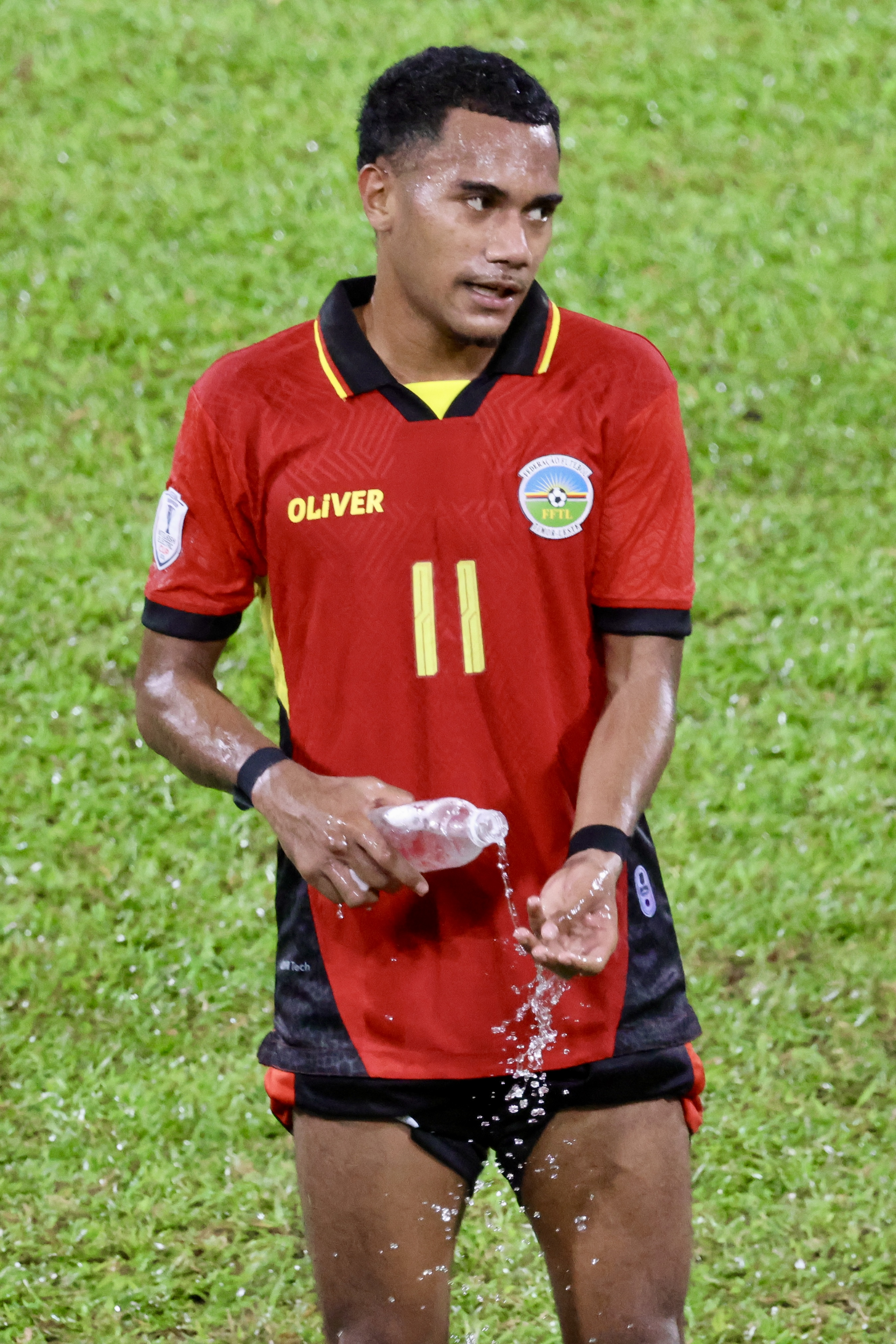
- Zenivio with East Timor in 2024

Personal information
- Full name: Zenivio Morientes Gostavo Conceição Mota
- Date of birth: 22 April 2005 (age 21)
- Place of birth: Ainaro, East Timor
- Height: 1.70 m (5 ft 7 in)
- Position: Winger

Team information
- Current team: Karketu Dili

Senior career*
Years	Team	Apps	(Gls)
–2020	Boavista TL		
2021–2023	SLB Laulara		
2023–2024	Kirivong Sok Sen Chey	25	(3)
2024–2026	Tanjong Pagar United	50	(3)
2026–	Karketu Dili	7	(2)

International career^{‡}
2019	Timor-Leste U17	4	(1)
2022	Timor-Leste U19	2	(1)
2021–	Timor-Leste U23	15	(3)
2021–	Timor-Leste	28	(2)
- * Club domestic league appearances and goals as of 5 May 2026 ‡ National team caps and goals as of 3 August 2026

Zenivio Morientes Gostavo Conceição Mota (born 22 April 2005), simply known as Zenivio, or also known as Gostavo, is a Timorese professional footballer who plays as a winger for Liga Futebol Timor-Leste club Karketu Dili and the Timor-Leste national team.

== Career statistics ==
As of match played 25 May 2025

Club	Season	League			Cup		Continental		Other		Total	
Club	Season	Division	Apps	Goals	Apps	Goals	Apps	Goals	Apps	Goals	Apps	Goals
Kirivong Sok Sen Chey	2023–24	Cambodian Premier League	25	3	0	0	0	0	0	0	25	3
Kirivong Sok Sen Chey	Total		25	3	0	0	0	0	0	0	25	3
Tanjong Pagar United	2024–25	Singapore Premier League	31	1	3	0	0	0	0	0	34	1
Tanjong Pagar United	Total		31	1	3	0	0	0	0	0	34	1
Career total			56	4	3	0	0	0	0	0	59	4

== International career ==
Zenivio made four appearances during 2020 AFC U-16 Championship qualification. He scored one goal in the team's Group Stage victory over Macau. In October 2021 he appeared in all three of Timor-Leste's 2022 AFC U-23 Asian Cup qualification matches. In the final match of the Group Stage he scored his team's only goal in a 1–0 victory over the Philippines.

Two months later, on 5 December 2021, Zenivio made his senior international debut in a 2020 AFF Championship match against Thailand at age 16. He made three appearances in the competition, all as a substitute.

=== International career statistics ===
As of match played 3 August 2026

Timor-Leste national team
Year	Apps	Goals
2021	3	0
2022	5	0
2023	0	0
2024	8	1
2025	6	0
2026	6	1
Total	28	2

=== International goals ===
Scores and results list Timor-Leste's goal tally first.

No.	Date	Venue	Opponent	Score	Result	Competition
1.	5 September 2024	Kapten I Wayan Dipta Stadium, Gianyar, Indonesia	Mongolia	4–1	4–1	2027 AFC Asian Cup qualification
2.	2 June 2026	Hassanal Bolkiah National Stadium, Bandar Seri Begawan, Brunei	Brunei	2–0	3–0	2026 ASEAN Championship qualification
