= Tristan Arrarte =

Timorese footballer

Personal information
- Full name: Tristan Xavi Arrarte
- Date of birth: July 26, 2008 (age 18)
- Place of birth: Sydney, Australia
- Height: 1.74 m (5 ft 8 1/2 in)
- Position: Attacking midfielder

Team information
- Current team: Western Sydney Wanderers
- Number: 16

Youth career
- 2013–2025: Marconi Stallions

Senior career*
Years	Team	Apps	(Gls)
2025–	Western Sydney Wanderers II	27	(3)

International career^{‡}
2025	Timor-Leste U23	4	(0)
2026–	Timor-Leste	4	(0)
- * Club domestic league appearances and goals as of 01:04, 26 July 2026 (UTC) ‡ National team caps and goals as of 01:04, 26 July 2026 (UTC)

Tristan Xavi Arrarte (Spanish: Tristán; born 26 July 2008) is a footballer who plays as a midfielder for the NPL New South Wales club Western Sydney Wanderers II. Born in Australia, he plays for the Timor-Leste national team.

== Club career ==
Arrarte began playing football locally with Marconi Stallions since the age of 5. He later joined Western Sydney Wanderers.

== International career ==
Born in Australia, Arrarte is of Timorese and Portuguese descent through his mother, and Argentine and Uruguayan through his father. He was therefore eligible to play for 5 national teams, Australia, East Timor, Portugal, Argentina and Uruguay. He was first called up to the Timor-Leste U23s in 2025 at the age of 16. He made his senior international debut for the senior Timor-Leste team on 31 March 2026 as a subtitute in a 2–1 defeat to Maldives for 2027 AFC Asian Cup qualifiers. He was called up to the national team for the 2026 ASEAN Championship.

== Personal life ==
Arrarte is the son of Nahuel Arrarte, an Argentine former footballer who played in Australia, Malaysia and Fiji before becoming a coach. Tristan supports the Argentine club River Plate.
