= Bong Samuel =

Cambodian footballer

Personal information
- Full name: Bong Samuel
- Date of birth: 25 September 2005 (age 21)
- Place of birth: Cambodia
- Height: 1.74 m (5 ft 9 in)
- Position: Central midfielder

Team information
- Current team: Phnom Penh Crown
- Number: 23

Youth career
- Phnom Penh Crown

Senior career*
Years	Team	Apps	(Gls)
2023–	Phnom Penh Crown	62	(3)

International career^{‡}
2024	Cambodia U20	2	(0)
2025–	Cambodia U23	3	(0)
2025–	Cambodia	13	(1)
Medal record
Men's football
Representing Cambodia
FIFA ASEAN Challenge Cup
Runner-up	2026 Hong Kong
- * Club domestic league appearances and goals as of 9 November 2026 ‡ National team caps and goals as of 5 October 2026

Bong Samuel (born 25 September 2005) is a Cambodian professional footballer who plays as a central midfielder for Cambodian Premier League club Phnom Penh Crown and the Cambodia national team.

== International career ==
Samuel made his senior debut in friendly match against Vietnam national football team on 19 March 2025 and scored his first international goal in his debut game despite losing 1-2.

== Career statistics ==
As of match played 13 November 2025

Appearances and goals by national team and year
National team	Year	Apps	Goals
Cambodia	2025	4	1
Total		4	1

Scores and results list Cambodia's goal tally first, score column indicates score after each Samuel goal.

List of international goals scored by Bong Samuel
No.	Date	Venue	Opponent	Score	Result	Competition
1.	19 March 2025	Gò Đậu Stadium, Thủ Dầu Một, Vietnam	Vietnam	1–2	1–2	Friendly

== Honours ==
Phnom Penh Crown

- Hun Sen Cup: 2024–25
