= Mon Rado =

Cambodian footballer

Personal information
- Full name: Mon Rado
- Date of birth: 27 January 2004 (age 22)
- Place of birth: Phnom Penh, Cambodia
- Position: Striker

Team information
- Current team: MOI Kompong Dewa
- Number: 27

Senior career*
Years	Team	Apps	(Gls)
2023–2025	Ministry of Interior		
2025–2026	Visakha	1	(0)
2025–2026	→ MOI Kompong Dewa (loan)	15	(4)
2026–	MOI Kompong Dewa	3	(0)

International career^{‡}
2025	Cambodia U23	5	(1)
2026–	Cambodia	6	(2)
- * Club domestic league appearances and goals as of 22 September 2026 (UTC) ‡ National team caps and goals as of 7 August 2026

Mon Rado (born 27 January 2004) is a Cambodian professional footballer who plays as a striker for Cambodian Premier League club MOI Kompong Dewa and the Cambodia national team.

== International career ==
On 25 May 2026, Rado was called up to the Cambodia senior team for a friendly match against Bhutan and Hong Kong. He made his senior debut and scored his first goal on 4 June in a 4–0 win over Bhutan.

== International goals ==
No.	Date	Venue	Opponent	Score	Result	Competition
1.	4 June 2026	Phnom Penh Olympic Stadium, Phnom Penh, Cambodia	Bhutan	4–0	4–0	Friendly
2.	3 August 2026	Morodok Techo National Stadium, Phnom Penh, Cambodia	Timor-Leste	3–0	3–0	2026 ASEAN Championship
