= 2019 C-League =

C-League
- Season: 2019
- Champions: Preah Khan Reach Svay Rieng FC
- AFC Cup: Preah Khan Reach Svay Rieng FC
- Matches: 182
- Goals: 799 (4.39 per match)
- Top goalscorer: Befolo Mbarga 36 goals
- Biggest home win: Visakha FC 14-0 Kampong Cham FC (4 May 2019)
- Biggest away win: Kampong Cham FC 0-18 Nagaworld FC (26 May 2019)
- Highest scoring: Kampong Cham FC 2-17 Phnom Penh Crown FC (30 June 2019)
- Longest winning run: Visakha FC (8 games)
- Longest unbeaten run: Preah Khan Reach Svay Rieng FC (25 games)
- Longest winless run: Bati Academy (21 games)
- Longest losing run: Bati Academy (19 games)
- Highest attendance: 5,863; Phnom Penh Crown FC 2-5 Preah Khan Reach Svay Rieng FC (28 July 2019)
- Lowest attendance: 60; Electricite du Cambodge FC 0-1 Kampong Cham FC (16 March 2019)

2019 Metfone C-League is the 35th season of the C-League. Contested by 14 clubs, it operates on a system of promotion and relegation with Cambodian Second League.

== 2019 season clubs ==
=== Teams ===
Locations of the 2019 C-League teams

Team	Location	Stadium	Previous season
Angkor Tiger	Siem Reap Province	Svay Thom Stadium	C-League (8th)
Asia Euro United	Kandal Province	AEU Sport Park	C-League (7th)
Boeung Ket FC	Phnom Penh	Boeung Ket Training Center	C-League (Runner-up)
EDC FC	Phnom Penh	EDC Stadium	C-League (11th)
Nagaworld FC	Phnom Penh	RCAF Old Stadium	C-League (Winner)
Army FC	Phnom Penh	RCAF Old Stadium	C-League (4th)
National Police Commissary FC	Kandal Province	SCT Sports Complex	C-League (9th)
Phnom Penh Crown	Phnom Penh	RSN Stadium	C-League (5th)
Preah Khan Reach Svay Rieng FC	Svay Rieng Province	Svay Rieng Stadium	C-League (6nd)
Soltilo Angkor	Siem Reap Province	Svay Thom Stadium	C-League (10th)
Visakha	Phnom Penh	Visakha Stadium	C-League (3rd)
Bati Academy	Takeo Province	Bati Academy Stadium	Promoted
Kampong Cham FC	Kampong Cham Province	Bun Rany Hun Sen Memot Stadium	Promoted
Kirivong Sok Sen Chey	Takeo Province	Kirivong Stadium	Promoted

- Notes;
- Kirivong Sok Sen Chey and two other teams were invited to the 2019 season because the Cambodian Second League was not held in 2019. FFC announced its decision before regular season started.

=== Personnel and Kits ===
Team	Manager	Captain	Kit manufacturer	Main sponsor	Official Facebook
Angkor Tiger	(Spain) Oriol Mohedano	(Cambodia) Hem Simay	ACUORE	N/A	https://www.facebook.com/angkortigerfc.ffc/
Asia Euro United	(Cambodia) Sok Veasna	(Australia) Joshua Jokic	Tidal Sports	N/A	https://www.facebook.com/aeukh/
Bati Academy	(Japan) Koji Gyotoku	(Cambodia) Seang Chanthea	FBT		
Boeung Ket FC	(Cambodia) Hao Socheat	(Cambodia) Sun Sovannrithy	FBT	Cambodia Airways	https://www.facebook.com/boeungketfootballclub/
EDC FC	(Cambodia) Prak Vuthy	(Cambodia) Moun Nara	Self-apparel	N/A	https://www.facebook.com/edcfootballclub/
Kampong Cham FC	(Cambodia) Thol Kosal	(Cambodia) Ly Anavy	NT Sport	N/A	https://www.facebook.com/kampongchamfootballclub/
Kirivong Sok Sen Chey	(Thailand) Ekapob Potisai	(Cambodia) Lim Samedi	SUSI	E-GetS	https://www.facebook.com/Kirivongsoksencheyfc/
Nagaworld FC	(Cambodia) Meas Channa	(Cambodia) Kouch Sokumpheak	FBT	Nagaworld	https://www.facebook.com/nagacorpfc/
Army FC	(Cambodia) Phea Sopheaktra	(Cambodia) Reung Bunheing	Grand Sport	TIFFY	https://www.facebook.com/mndarmyfc/
National Police Commissary FC	(Cambodia) Prak Sovannara	(Cambodia) Say Piseth	FAN		
Phnom Penh Crown	(Cambodia) Sum Vanna	(Cambodia) Ouk Sothy	FBT	Smart Axiata	https://www.facebook.com/phnompenhcrownfc/
Preah Khan Reach Svay Rieng FC	(Republic of Ireland) Conor Nestor	(Cambodia) Soeuy Visal	FBT	Carabao	https://www.facebook.com/pkrsvrofficial/
Soltilo Angkor	(England) Darren Pomroy	(Japan) Kento Fujihara	SUSI	Sendō	https://www.facebook.com/soltiloangkorfc/
Visakha	(Cambodia) Hok Sochivorn	(Cambodia) Tieng Tiny	NT Sport	Prince Bank	https://www.facebook.com/visakhafc/

== Foreign players ==
The number of foreign players is restricted to five per team. A team can use four foreign players on the field in each game, including at least one player from the AFC country.

Players name in bold indicates the player is registered during the mid-season transfer window.

Club	Player 1	Player 2	Player 3	Player 4	Asian Player	Former Players
Angkor Tiger	(Japan) Ryota Hayashi	(Nigeria) Okereke Timothy	(Argentina) Alexis Ramos	(Spain) **Nando Cózar**	(Japan) Joichiro Sugiyama	(Japan) Yudai Ogawa
Asia Europe United	(Ivory Coast) Abdel Kader Coulibaly	(Cameroon) **Julien William**	(Cameroon) **Ndoumene Yannick Francois**	(Japan) **Tsutomu Hasegawa**	(Japan) Tsubasa Mitani	(Japan) Tomohiro Masaki (Nigeria) Ajayi Opeyemi Korede (Australia) Joshua Jokic
Bati Academy						
Boeung Ket FC	(Nigeria) Samuel Ajayi	(Brazil) Dudu	(Japan) **Kenta Yamazaki**	(Nigeria) Julius Oiboh	(Japan) Hikaru Mizuno	(Spain) Ángel Carrascosa
Electricite du Cambodge						
Kampong Cham FC	(Ghana) Michael Osei Tutu	(Ghana) **Emmanuel Kwesi Adu**	(Ghana) **Jean Bertand Cheick Ismael Toa**	(Nigeria) **Nwankwo Chika Junior**	(Japan) **Shoya Aso**	(Ghana) Tcheugoue Edongue (Japan) Kenjiro Ogino (Egypt) Adnam Abdelrahin Fawzy Elebiary (Egypt) Onar Ibrahim Abdelkhalek Sayed Ahmed
Kirivong Sok Sen Chey	(Mali) Souleymane Coulibaly	(Brazil) Marcio Santos	(Japan) Reiya Kinoshita	(Ivory Coast) **Coulibaly Major Bangaly**	(Japan) **Taku Yanagidate**	(Japan) Yuto Sasaki (Japan) Takahito Ota
Nagaworld FC	(Ivory Coast) Anderson Zogbe	(Nigeria) Esoh Paul Omogba	(Rwanda) Atuheire Kipson	(Japan) **Yugo Kawabata**	(Turkmenistan) Amir Gurbani	
Army FC	(Egypt) Mohamed Hamza	(Nigeria) George Bisan	(Nigeria) Ugochukwu Obi Moneke	(South Africa) **Mohammed Khan**	(South Korea) **Na Hyo-sung**	(Japan) Taku Yanagidate (Nigeria) Dzarma Bata
National Police Commissary FC	(Nigeria) Mathew Osa	(Nigeria) Momoh Degule	(Brazil) Magson	(Brazil) Souza E Silva Matheus	(Japan) **Tomohiro Masaki**	(Japan) Shun Kumagai (South Africa) Shane Booysen
Phnom Penh Crown	(Brazil) Paulo Victor	(South Africa) **Shane Booysen**	(Nigeria) **Dzarma Bata**		(Afghanistan) **Mustafa Zazai**	(Brazil) Darlan Martins (Brazil) Jhonata Sant'anna (Brazil) Leonardo Oliveira (Japan) Shuhei Mitsuhashi
Preah Khan Reach Svay Rieng FC	(South Korea) Yeon Gi-sung	(United States) Jonny Campbell	(England) Charlie Machell	(Cameroon) Befolo Mbarga	(Japan) Daisuke Kobayashi	
Soltilo Angkor	(Japan) Kento Fujihara	(Japan) Unno Tomoyuki	(Japan) Motoyama Kota	(Japan) Fumiya Kogure	(Japan) Yuta Kikuchi	
Visakha	(North Korea) Pak Song-chol	(Nigeria) **Ajayi Opeyemi Korede**	(Brazil) Eliel Cruz	(Japan) Masaaki Ideguchi	(North Korea) **Hong Kum-song**	(Germany) Evangelos Skraparas (Bulgaria) Lyuben Nikolov

- Notes;
- Both Bati Academy and Electricite du Cambodge do not use foreign players.

== League table ==
Pos	Team	Pld	W	D	L	GF	GA	GD	Pts	Qualification or relegation
1	Preah Khan Reach Svay Rieng (C)	26	20	5	1	88	20	+68	65	Qualification for AFC Cup play-off round
2	Visakha	26	18	4	4	86	30	+56	58	
3	Nagaworld	26	17	4	5	80	22	+58	55	
4	Boeung Ket	26	15	7	4	69	36	+33	52	
5	Angkor Tiger	26	14	7	5	68	32	+36	49	
6	Phnom Penh Crown	26	15	3	8	94	47	+47	48	
7	National Defense Ministry	26	12	2	12	63	50	+13	38	
8	Soltilo Angkor	26	10	5	11	38	40	−2	35	
9	Kirivong Sok Sen Chey	26	11	1	14	49	39	+10	34	
10	Asia Euro United	26	10	4	12	47	57	−10	34	
11	National Police Commissary	26	8	4	14	58	59	−1	28	
12	Electricite du Cambodge	26	5	1	20	24	75	−51	16	
13	Kampong Cham (R)	26	2	0	24	10	180	−170	6	Relegation to Cambodian Second League
14	Bati Academy	26	1	1	24	25	112	−87	4	

Source: C-League
Rules for classification: 1) Points; 2) Goal difference; 3) Goals scored.
(C) Champions; (R) Relegated

== Positions by round ==
Team ╲ Round	1	2	3	4	5	6	7	8	9	10	11	12	13	14	15	16	17	18	19	20	21	22	23	24	25	26
Angkor Tiger	6	2	6	5	3	5	4	4	4	3	3	3	3	3	3	3	3	4	5	5	4	4				
Asia Europe United	11	13	10	7	7	7	8	7	9	8	8	9	9	9	9	9	9	10	8	8	8	9				
Bati Academy	14	14	14	14	12	13	13	13	13	13	13	13	13	13	13	13	13	14	14	14	14	14				
Boeung Ket FC	3	7	7	6	5	4	6	6	6	4	4	4	4	5	5	5	5	5	4	4	5	5				
EDC FC	11	8	5	8	8	8	9	11	11	11	11	12	12	12	12	10	11	11	12	12	12	12				
Kirivong Sok Sen Chey	1	5	9	9	11	9	11	8	10	12	12	11	11	10	10	11	10	9	10	10	9	8				
Kampong Cham FC	4	11	12	12	13	14	14	14	14	14	14	14	14	14	14	14	14	13	13	13	13	13				
Nagaworld FC	4	9	4	4	2	2	2	1	1	2	2	2	2	2	2	2	2	2	3	2	3	3				
Army FC	6	3	2	2	4	6	5	5	5	6	7	7	7	7	7	7	6	7	7	7	7	7				
National Police Commissary FC	13	9	11	11	10	11	12	12	12	10	10	10	10	11	11	12	12	12	11	11	11	11				
Phnom Penh Crown	10	5	8	10	9	10	7	10	8	7	6	6	6	6	6	6	7	6	6	6	6	6				
Preah Khan Reach Svay Rieng FC	2	1	1	1	1	1	1	2	2	1	1	1	1	1	1	1	1	1	1	1	1	1				
Soltilo Angkor	8	12	13	13	14	12	10	9	7	9	9	8	8	8	8	8	8	8	9	9	10	10				
Visakha	8	4	3	3	6	3	3	3	3	5	5	5	5	4	4	4	4	3	2	3	2	2				

Champion and qualification for the 2020 AFC Cup play-off round
Relegation

== Results by match played ==
Team ╲ Round	1	2	3	4	5	6	7	8	9	10	11	12	13	14	15	16	17	18	19	20	21	22	23	24	25	26
Angkor Tiger	D	W	D	W	W	D	W	L	W	W	W	L	W	W	W	D	W	L	D	D	W	L				
Asia Euro United	L	L	W	W	L	D	L	W	L	W	W	L	L	L	D	W	L	L	W	D	W	D				
Bati Academy	L	L	L	L	W	L	L	L	L	L	L	L	L	L	L	L	L	L	L	L	L	L				
Boeung Ket FC	W	L	D	W	W	W	L	D	W	W	W	L	W	D	W	D	W	W	W	D	L	D				
EDC FC	L	W	W	L	L	D	L	L	L	W	L	L	L	W	L	W	L	L	L	L	L	L				
Kirivong Sok Sen Chey	W	L	L	L	L	W	L	W	L	L	L	W	L	W	L	L	W	W	L	D	W	W				
Kampong Cham FC	W	L	L	L	L	L	L	L	L	L	L	L	L	L	L	L	L	W	L	L	L	L				
Nagaworld FC	W	L	W	W	W	W	W	W	W	L	W	L	D	W	W	W	W	L	D	W	L	W				
Army FC	D	W	W	W	L	D	W	L	W	L	L	W	W	L	L	W	W	L	W	W	L	L				
National Police Commissary FC	L	W	L	L	D	L	L	W	L	W	L	W	L	L	D	L	L	D	W	L	W	W				
Phnom Penh Crown	L	W	L	L	W	L	W	L	W	W	W	W	W	D	W	L	L	W	D	W	W	L				
Preah Khan Reach Svay Rieng FC	W	W	W	W	W	D	W	D	W	W	W	W	D	W	W	W	W	W	D	W	W	W				
Soltilo Angkor	D	L	L	L	D	D	W	W	W	L	W	W	W	L	L	L	L	D	L	D	L	W				
Visakha	D	W	W	W	L	W	W	W	L	L	L	W	W	W	W	W	W	W	W	D	W	W				

Win
Draw
Lose

== Results ==
Home \ Away	AKT	AEU	Bati	BKT	EDC	KRV	KPC	Naga	NDM	NPC	PPC	PKR	STL	VSK
Angkor Tiger	—	6–1	8–3	1–1	3–1	2–0	4–0	1–0	3–1	4–2		1–1		2–1
Asia Euro United	1–1	—	6–1	2–3	2–2	2–1	5–0	0–1		1–1	3–4	0–2	2–1	
Bati Academy	0–6		—	1–3	1–5	0–1	0–1	0–3	1–4		0–2	0–3	1–2	0–7
Boeung Ket FC	1–1	2–2	6–0	—	4–0		4–0		4–3		4–4	1–2		1–1
EDC FC		1–2	2–0	1–0	—		0–1	0–3	0–3	1–2	0–5	0–1	2–4	0–7
Kirivong Sok Sen Chey		2–0	4–1	1–2	1–2	—	12–0	1–3	4–1	1–3	3–2	0–2	0–1	1–4
Kampong Cham FC	0–11	0–2	0–3	0–7	1–3		—	0–18	2–4		2–17	0–13	0–6	0–2
Nagaworld FC	4–0	6–1		0–2	6–1	0–2	3–0	—	2–4	6–0	3–0		3–0	2–3
Army FC	1–1	4–1	4–3	0–2		1–2	11–0	0–1	—	3–2		1–2	2–0	1–0
National Police Commissary FC	4–1	3–2	5–1	1–2	1–0	2–3	14–2	1–3	2–4	—	2–3	0–2	2–2	
Phnom Penh Crown	1–0	1–0	12–1	2–3		2–1		2–2	3–1	3–0	—	2–5	2–1	1–3
Preah Khan Reach Svay Rieng FC	1–1		7–0	2–2	7–0	2–1	5–0	0–0		2–0	5–1	—	6–1	5–3
Soltilo Angkor	0–3	0–1		5–4	1–0	0–0		0–1	1–1	0–0	1–0	0–1	—	2–3
Visakha	2–1	1–3	5–1	3–2	4–0	2–0	14–0		3–0	3–1	4–3		0–0	—

Updated to match(es) played on 20 April 2019. Source: C-League
Legend: Blue = home team win; Yellow = draw; Red = away team win.

== Matches ==
Fixtures and results of the 2019 C-League season.

=== Week 1 ===
16 March 2019	Kirivong Sok Sen Chey (Cambodia)	4 - 1	(Cambodia) Bati Youth	Kirivong Stadium, Takeo Province
15:30 UTC+07:30	(Mali) Souleymane Coulibaly 4', 6', 12' (Japan) Reiya Kinoshita 83'		(Cambodia) Seang Chanthea 19'

16 March 2019	EDC FC (Cambodia)	0 - 1	(Cambodia) Kampong Cham FC	EDC Stadium, Phnom Penh
15:30 UTC+07:30			(Cambodia) Sary Taimo 77'

16 March 2019	Phnom Penh Crown (Cambodia)	2 - 3	(Cambodia) Boeung Ket FC	RSN Stadium, Phnom Penh
18:00 UTC+07:30	(Brazil) Paulo Victor Costa Soares 8' (Cambodia) Neou Sosela 74'		(Cambodia) Yue Safy 41' (o.g.) (Spain) Ángel Carrascosa 53' (Cambodia) Ly Mizan 62'

17 March 2019	Visakha (Cambodia)	0 - 0	(Cambodia) Soltilo Angkor	Visakha Stadium, Phnom Penh
15:30 UTC+07:30

17 March 2019	Asia Europe United (Cambodia)	0 - 1	(Cambodia) Nagaworld FC	AEU Sport Park, Phnom Penh
15:30 UTC+07:30			(Cambodia) Leng Makara 67'

17 March 2019	Preah Khan Reach Svay Rieng FC (Cambodia)	2 - 0	(Cambodia) National Police Commissary FC	Svay Rieng Stadium, Svay Rieng Province
18:00 UTC+07:30	(Cambodia) Nen Sothearoth 70' (pen.) (South Korea) Yeon Gi-sung 78'

17 March 2019	Army FC (Cambodia)	1 - 1	(Cambodia) Angkor Tiger	RCAF Old Stadium, Phnom Penh
18:00 UTC+07:30	(Cambodia) Kan Pisal 90+6'		(Argentina) Alexis Ramos 54'

=== Week 2 ===
30 March 2019	National Police Commissary FC (Cambodia)	3 - 2	(Cambodia) Asia Europe United	EDC Stadium, Phnom Penh
15:30 UTC+07:30	(Cambodia) Ol Ravy 5' (Nigeria) Jose Magson Bezerra Dourdo 9' (Nigeria) Mathew Osa 24'		(Cambodia) Chhim Sambo 77' (Ivory Coast) Abdel Kader Coulibali 78'

30 March 2019	Visakha (Cambodia)	2 - 0	(Cambodia) Kirivong Sok Sen Chey	Visakha Stadium, Phnom Penh
18:00 UTC+07:30	(Brazil) Eliel da Cruz Guardiano 39' (Japan) Masaaki Ideguchi 48'

30 March 2019	Nagaworld FC (Cambodia)	2 - 4	(Cambodia) Army FC	RCAF Old Stadium, Phnom Penh
18:00 UTC+07:30	(Rwanda) Atuheire Kipson 7' (Cambodia) Khim Borey 81'		(Nigeria) Dzarma Bata 25', 36', 76' (Nigeria) Ugochukwu Obi Moneke 31'

31 March 2019	Soltilo Angkor (Cambodia)	0 - 1	(Cambodia) Preah Khan Reach Svay Rieng FC	Svay Thom Stadium, Siem Reap Province
15:30 UTC+07:30			(England) Charlie Machell 86'

31 March 2019	Bati Youth (Cambodia)	0 - 2	(Cambodia) Phnom Penh Crown	Bati Academy Stadium, Takeo Province
15:30 UTC+07:30			(Cambodia) Mao Piseth 81' (Cambodia) Pov Ponvuthy 84'

31 March 2019	Kampong Cham FC (Cambodia)	0 - 11	(Cambodia) Angkor Tiger	Bun Rany Hun Sen Memot Stadium, Kampong Cham Province
15:30 UTC+07:30			(Japan) Yudai Ogawa 2', 37', 41' (Argentina) Alexis Ramos 15' (Cambodia) Long Phearath 27' (Cambodia) Tang Sopheak 65' (Nigeria) Okereke Timothy 69', 73' (Cambodia) Pov Phearith 76' (Cambodia) Tang Pisey 86' (Cambodia) Pich Sovankhamarin 90'

31 March 2019	EDC FC (Cambodia)	1 - 0	(Cambodia) Boeung Ket FC	EDC Stadium, Phnom Penh
15:30 UTC+07:30	(Cambodia) Sian Sopheaktra 89'

=== Week 3 ===
6 April 2019	Asia Europe United (Cambodia)	2 - 1	(Cambodia) Soltilo Angkor	AEU Sport Park, Phnom Penh
15:30 UTC+07:30	(Ivory Coast) Abdel Kader Coulibali 10' (pen.) (Cambodia) Chhim Sambo 32'		(Japan) Fumiya Kogure 37'

6 April 2019	EDC FC (Cambodia)	2 - 0	(Cambodia) Bati Youth	EDC Stadium, Phnom Penh
15:30 UTC+07:30	(Cambodia) Ke Vannak 10' (pen.), 22'

6 April 2019	Army FC (Cambodia)	11 - 0	(Cambodia) Kampong Cham FC	RCAF Old Stadium, Phnom Penh
18:00 UTC+07:30	(Nigeria) Dzarma Bata 22', 26', 60' (Nigeria) Ugochukwu Obi Moneke 44', 56' (Cambodia) Reung Bunheing 49', 83', 88' (Nigeria) George Bisan 70', 77' (Cambodia) Narong Kakada 84'

7 April 2019	Angkor Tiger (Cambodia)	1 - 1	(Cambodia) Boeung Ket FC	Svay Thom Stadium, Siem Reap Province
15:30 UTC+07:30	(Japan) Ryota Hayashi 81'		(Nigeria) Samuel Ajayi 30'

7 April 2019	Kirivong Sok Sen Chey (Cambodia)	0 - 2	(Cambodia) Preah Khan Reach Svay Rieng FC	Kirivong Stadium, Takeo Province
15:30 UTC+07:30			(Cambodia) Prak Mony Udom 24' (pen.) (South Korea) Yeon Gi-sung 48'

7 April 2019	Nagaworld FC (Cambodia)	6 - 0	(Cambodia) National Police Commissary FC	RCAF Old Stadium, Phnom Penh
18:00 UTC+07:30	(Turkmenistan) Amir Gurbani 2', 70' (Nigeria) Esoh Paul Omogba 63' (Rwanda) Atuheire Kipson 68' (Cambodia) Kouch Dani 77' (Cambodia) Nhim Sovannara 87'

7 April 2019	Phnom Penh Crown (Cambodia)	1 - 3	(Cambodia) Visakha	RSN Stadium, Phnom Penh
18:00 UTC+07:30	(Brazil) Paulo Victor 69'		(Brazil) Eliel da Cruz Guardiano 2', 26' (Cambodia) Tith Dina 84'

=== Week 4 ===
20 April 2019	Bati Youth (Cambodia)	0 - 6	(Cambodia) Angkor Tiger	Bati Academy Stadium, Takeo Province
15:30 UTC+07:30			(Nigeria) Okereke Timothy 13', 49', 53', 67' (Japan) Joichiro Sugiyama 65' (Cambodia) Pov Phearith 72'

20 April 2019	Asia Europe United (Cambodia)	2 - 1	(Cambodia) Kirivong Sok Sen Chey	AEU Sport Park, Phnom Penh
15:30 UTC+07:30	(Ivory Coast) Abdel Kader Coulibali 2', 35'		(Japan) Yuto Sasaki 45+2'

20 April 2019	Visakha (Cambodia)	4 - 0	(Cambodia) EDC FC	Visakha Stadium, Phnom Penh
18:00 UTC+07:30	(North Korea) Pak Song-chol 12' (Cambodia) Tith Dina 47' (Greece) Evangelos Skraparas 67' (Japan) Masaaki Ideguchi 73'

21 April 2019	Kampong Cham FC (Cambodia)	0 - 7	(Cambodia) Boeung Ket FC	Bun Rany Hun Sen Memot Stadium, Kampong Cham Province
15:30 UTC+07:30			(Cambodia) Mat Yamin 5' (Nigeria) Julius Oiboh 10', 24', 87' (Brazil) Dudu 32', 49' (Cambodia) Khoun Laboravy 54'

21 April 2019	National Police Commissary FC (Cambodia)	2 - 4	(Cambodia) Army FC	EDC Stadium, Phnom Penh
15:30 UTC+07:30	(Cambodia) Kornai Ann Sary 80' (South Africa) Shane Booysen 88'		(Nigeria) George Bisan 55' (Nigeria) Dzarma Bata 57', 58', 77'

21 April 2019	Soltilo Angkor (Cambodia)	0 - 1	(Cambodia) Nagaworld FC	Svay Thom Stadium, Siem Reap Province
15:30 UTC+07:30			(Turkmenistan) Amir Gurbani 45'

21 April 2019	Preah Khan Reach Svay Rieng FC (Cambodia)	5 - 1	(Cambodia) Phnom Penh Crown	Svay Rieng Stadium, Svay Rieng Province
18:00 UTC+07:30	(Cambodia) Sok Samnang 15' (Cambodia) Prak Mony Udom 22' (pen.), 51' (Cameroon) Befolo Mbarga 49', 58'		(Brazil) Paulo Victor 36' (pen.)

=== Week 5 ===
27 April 2019	EDC FC (Cambodia)	0 - 1	(Cambodia) Preah Khan Reach Svay Rieng FC	EDC Stadium, Phnom Penh
15:30 UTC+07:30			(Cambodia) Sareth Krya 49'

27 April 2019	Kampong Cham FC (Cambodia)	0 - 3	(Cambodia) Bati Youth	Bun Rany Hun Sen Memot Stadium, Kampong Cham Province
15:30 UTC+07:30			(Cambodia) Seang Chanthea 19' (Cambodia) Bunthoeun Bunnarong 72', 87'

27 April 2019	Army FC (Cambodia)	0 - 2	(Cambodia) Boeung Ket FC	RCAF Old Stadium, Phnom Penh
18:00 UTC+07:30			(Cambodia) Ly Mizan 60' (Brazil) Dudu 66'

28 April 2019	Angkor Tiger (Cambodia)	2 - 1	(Cambodia) Visakha	Svay Thom Stadium, Siem Reap Province
15:30 UTC+07:30	(Japan) Yudai Ogawa 10', 69'		(Japan) Masaaki Ideguchi 61'

28 April 2019	National Police Commissary FC (Cambodia)	2 - 2	(Cambodia) Soltilo Angkor	EDC Stadium, Phnom Penh
15:30 UTC+07:30	(Nigeria) Jose Magson Bezerra Dourdo 28' (Cambodia) Noun Borey 71'		(Japan) Yuta Kikuchi 47', 74'

28 April 2019	Kirivong Sok Sen Chey (Cambodia)	1 - 3	(Cambodia) Nagaworld FC	Kirivong Stadium, Takeo Province
15:30 UTC+07:30	(Cambodia) Som Dara 58'		(Cambodia) Ngor Borey 19' (o.g.) (Nigeria) Esoh Paul Omogba 45' (Cambodia) Suong Virak 52'

28 April 2019	Phnom Penh Crown (Cambodia)	1 - 0	(Cambodia) Asia Europe United	RSN Stadium, Phnom Penh
18:00 UTC+07:30	(Brazil) Paulo Victor 75'

=== Week 6 ===
4 May 2019	National Police Commissary FC (Cambodia)	2 - 3	(Cambodia) Kirivong Sok Sen Chey	EDC Stadium, Phnom Penh
15:30 UTC+07:30	(South Africa) Shane Booysen 17', 66' (pen.)		(Japan) Takahito Ota 3' (Cambodia) Dav Nim 6' (Mali) Souleymane Coulibaly 76' (pen.)

4 May 2019	Soltilo Angkor (Cambodia)	1 - 1	(Cambodia) Army FC	Svay Thom Stadium, Siem Reap Province
15:30 UTC+07:30	(Cambodia) Ly Moslim 37'		(Nigeria) Dzarma Bata 62'

4 May 2019	Visakha (Cambodia)	14 - 0	(Cambodia) Kampong Cham FC	Visakha Stadium, Phnom Penh
18:00 UTC+07:30	(Cambodia) Keo Sokpheng 3', 12', 23', 30' (pen.), 45', 69', 71' (pen.) (Greece) Evangelos Skraparas 44', 46' (Bulgaria) Lyuben Nikolov 58' (Cambodia) Sin Sophanat 80', 84' (North Korea) Pak Song-chol 83' (Cambodia) Sok Sovan 89'

5 May 2019	Asia Europe United (Cambodia)	2 - 2	(Cambodia) EDC FC	AEU Sport Park, Phnom Penh
15:30 UTC+07:30	(Cambodia) Chhim Sambo 11' (Japan) Tomohiro Masaki 81'		(Cambodia) Moun Nara 14', 54'

5 May 2019	Bati Youth (Cambodia)	1 - 3	(Cambodia) Boeung Ket FC	Bati Academy Stadium, Takeo Province
15:30 UTC+07:30	(Cambodia) Bunthoeun Bunnarong 6'		(Nigeria) Julius Oiboh 42', 90' (Brazil) Dudu 61'

5 May 2019	Nagaworld FC (Cambodia)	3 - 0	(Cambodia) Phnom Penh Crown	RCAF Old Stadium, Phnom Penh
18:00 UTC+07:30	(Turkmenistan) Amir Gurbani 34', 71' (Nigeria) Esoh Paul Omogba 36'

5 May 2019	Preah Khan Reach Svay Rieng FC (Cambodia)	1 - 1	(Cambodia) Angkor Tiger	Svay Rieng Stadium, Svay Rieng Province
18:00 UTC+07:30	(Japan) Daisuke Kobayashi 87'		(Cambodia) Tang Sopheak 64'

=== Week 7 ===
11 May 2019	EDC FC (Cambodia)	0 - 3	(Cambodia) Nagaworld FC	EDC Stadium, Phnom Penh
15:30 UTC+07:30			(Rwanda) Atuheire Kipson 31' (Ivory Coast) Anderson Zogbe 52' (Nigeria) Esoh Paul Omogba 78'

11 May 2019	Army FC (Cambodia)	4 - 3	(Cambodia) Bati Youth	RCAF Old Stadium, Phnom Penh
18:00 UTC+07:30	(Nigeria) George Bisan 45', 90' (Nigeria) Dzarma Bata 58', 86'		(Cambodia) Ean Pisey 40' (Cambodia) Bunthoeun Bunnarong 75' (Cambodia) Seang Chanthea 83'

11 May 2019	Visakha (Cambodia)	3 - 2	(Cambodia) Boeung Ket FC	Visakha Stadium, Phnom Penh
18:00 UTC+07:30	(Brazil) Eliel da Cruz Guardiano 67', 79' (pen.) (Cambodia) San Kimheng 90+2'		(Brazil) Dudu 63' (Cambodia) Khoun Laboravy 90+5'

12 May 2019	Angkor Tiger (Cambodia)	6 - 1	(Cambodia) Asia Europe United	Svay Thom Stadium, Siem Reap Province
15:30 UTC+07:30	(Cambodia) Chhom Pisa 33' (Nigeria) Okereke Timothy 45', 48', 57', 76' (Cambodia) Pov Phearith 90+1'		(Australia) Joshua Jokic 60'

12 May 2019	Kampong Cham FC (Cambodia)	0 - 13	(Cambodia) Preah Khan Reach Svay Rieng FC	Bun Rany Hun Sen Memot Stadium, Kampong Cham Province
15:30 UTC+07:30			(Cameroon) Befolo Mbarga 6', 18', 23', 34', 36', 51', 61' (Cambodia) Prak Mony Udom 55', 59' (Cambodia) Min Ratanak 76' (Cambodia) Tray Vichet 83' (Japan) Daisuke Kobayashi 84' (Cambodia) Nen Sothearoth 90+1' (pen.)

12 May 2019	Kirivong Sok Sen Chey (Cambodia)	0 - 1	(Cambodia) Soltilo Angkor	Kirivong Stadium, Takeo Province
15:30 UTC+07:30			(Japan) Fumiya Kogure 50'

12 May 2019	Phnom Penh Crown (Cambodia)	3 - 0	(Cambodia) National Police Commissary FC	RSN Stadium, Phnom Penh
18:00 UTC+07:30	(Cambodia) Yeu Muslim 12' (Brazil) Paulo Victor 28' (pen.) (Cambodia) Mao Piseth 90+3'

=== Week 8 ===
18 May 2019	Soltilo Angkor (Cambodia)	1 - 0	(Cambodia) Phnom Penh Crown	Svay Thom Stadium, Siem Reap Province
15:30 UTC+07:30	(Cambodia) Ly Saroth 13'

18 May 2019	Nagaworld FC (Cambodia)	4 - 0	(Cambodia) Angkor Tiger	RCAF Old Stadium, Phnom Penh
18:00 UTC+07:30	(Cambodia) Sos Suhana 21', 48' (Rwanda) Atuheire Kipson 64' (Nigeria) Esoh Paul Omogba 73'

18 May 2019	Visakha (Cambodia)	5 - 1	(Cambodia) Bati Youth	Visakha Stadium, Phnom Penh
18:00 UTC+07:30	(Cambodia) Tith Dina 9' (Brazil) Eliel da Cruz Guardiano 62', 69' (Bulgaria) Lyuben Nikolov 76' (Cambodia) Sary Matnorotin 81'

19 May 2019	Asia Europe United (Cambodia)	5 - 0	(Cambodia) Kampong Cham FC	AEU Sport Park, Phnom Penh
15:30 UTC+07:30	(Nigeria) Ajayi Opeyemi Korede 10' (pen.), 43', 75', 82' (Japan) Tsubasa Mitani 73'

19 May 2019	Kirivong Sok Sen Chey (Cambodia)	4 - 1	(Cambodia) Army FC	Kirivong Stadium, Takeo Province
15:30 UTC+07:30	(Brazil) Marcio Santos 32' (Japan) Reiya Kinoshita 52', 90+1' (Cambodia) Dav Nim 75'		(Nigeria) George Bisan 57' (pen.)

19 May 2019	National Police Commissary FC (Cambodia)	1 - 0	(Cambodia) EDC FC	EDC Stadium, Phnom Penh
15:30 UTC+07:30	(South Africa) Shane Booysen 78'

19 May 2019	Preah Khan Reach Svay Rieng FC (Cambodia)	2 - 2	(Cambodia) Boeung Ket FC	Svay Rieng Stadium, Svay Rieng Province
18:00 UTC+07:30	(Cameroon) Befolo Mbarga 52' (Cambodia) Soeuy Visal 54'		(Brazil) Dudu 45+2' (Cambodia) Khoun Laboravy 88'

=== Week 9 ===
25 May 2019	Angkor Tiger (Cambodia)	4 - 2	(Cambodia) National Police Commissary FC	Svay Thom Stadium, Siem Reap Province
15:30 UTC+07:30	(Nigeria) Okereke Timothy 9', 47', 63' (Cambodia) Long Phearath 42'		(Nigeria) Okereke Timothy 39' (o.g.) (South Africa) Shane Booysen

25 May 2019	Asia Europe United (Cambodia)	2 - 3	(Cambodia) Boeung Ket FC	AEU Sport Park, Phnom Penh
15:30 UTC+07:30	(Cambodia) San Chamrong 49' (Cambodia) Pin Saren 90+2'		(Nigeria) Samuel Ajayi 51' (Cambodia) Soeuth Nava 53' (Brazil) Dudu 83'

25 May 2019	Army FC (Cambodia)	1 - 0	(Cambodia) Visakha	RCAF Old Stadium, Phnom Penh
18:00 UTC+07:30	(Cambodia) Chhin Chhoeun 12'

26 May 2019	Bati Youth (Cambodia)	0 - 3	(Cambodia) Preah Khan Reach Svay Rieng FC	Bati Academy Stadium, Takeo Province
15:30 UTC+07:30			(Cameroon) Befolo Mbarga 11' (Cambodia) Soeuy Visal 18' (Cambodia) Hoy Phallin 42'

26 May 2019	EDC FC (Cambodia)	2 - 4	(Cambodia) Soltilo Angkor	EDC Stadium, Phnom Penh
15:30 UTC+07:30	(Cambodia) Moun Nara 52', 78'		(Japan) Yuta Kikuchi 15' (Japan) Fumiya Kogure 61' (Cambodia) Prak Chanratana 86' (Cambodia) Ly Moslim 90+5'

26 May 2019	Kampong Cham FC (Cambodia)	0 - 18	(Cambodia) Nagaworld FC	Bun Rany Hun Sen Memot Stadium, Kampong Cham Province
15:30 UTC+07:30			(Rwanda) Atuheire Kipson 10', 18', 25', 71', 79' (pen.) (Cambodia) Sos Suhana 22' (Cambodia) Kouch Sokumpheak 26' (Nigeria) Esoh Paul Omogba 42', 43', 48', 51', 82', 86', 89' (Cambodia) Kouch Dani 44' (Cambodia) Chhorn Dara 53' (Ivory Coast) Anderson Zogbe 54', 76' (pen.)

26 May 2019	Phnom Penh Crown (Cambodia)	2 - 1	(Cambodia) Kirivong Sok Sen Chey	RSN Stadium, Phnom Penh
18:00 UTC+07:30	(Cambodia) Brak Thiva 44' (Cambodia) Orn Chanpolin 90+3'		(Cambodia) Dav Nim 89'

=== Week 10 ===
1 June 2019	National Police Commissary FC (Cambodia)	14 - 2	(Cambodia) Kampong Cham FC	EDC Stadium, Phnom Penh
15:30 UTC+07:30	(South Africa) Shane Booysen 17', 32', 58' (Cambodia) Noun Borey 22', 36', 74', 77', 79' (Cambodia) Ly Anavy 28' (o.g.) (Nigeria) Mathew Osa 29', 45+2', 62', 90+4' (Cambodia) Mit Samael 68'		(Ghana) Soei Tutu Michael 86' (Cambodia) Povry Moni Botra 90+3'

1 June 2019	Soltilo Angkor (Cambodia)	0 - 3	(Cambodia) Angkor Tiger	Svay Thom Stadium, Siem Reap Province
15:30 UTC+07:30			(Argentina) Alexis Ramos 12', 20' (Nigeria) Okereke Timothy 90+1'

1 June 2019	Phnom Penh Crown (Cambodia)	3 - 1	(Cambodia) Army FC	RSN Stadium, Phnom Penh
18:00 UTC+07:30	(Cambodia) Mao Piseth 18' (Brazil) Paulo Victor 59' (pen.) (Cambodia) Va Sokthorn 90+2'		(Nigeria) Dzarma Bata 44'

2 June 2019	Asia Europe United (Cambodia)	6 - 1	(Cambodia) Bati Youth	AEU Sport Park, Phnom Penh
15:30 UTC+07:30	(Ivory Coast) Abdel Kader Coulibali 3', 29' (Nigeria) Ajayi Opeyemi Korede 45+2', 57', 76', 79'		(Cambodia) Bunthoeun Bunnarong 62'

2 June 2019	Kirivong Sok Sen Chey (Cambodia)	1 - 2	(Cambodia) EDC FC	Kirivong Stadium, Takeo Province
15:30 UTC+07:30	(Mali) Souleymane Coulibaly 90+1'		(Cambodia) Chhoeung Visnu 17' (Cambodia) Phach Socheavila 50'

2 June 2019	Nagaworld FC (Cambodia)	0 - 2	(Cambodia) Boeung Ket FC	RCAF Old Stadium, Phnom Penh
18:00 UTC+07:30			(Japan) Hikaru Mizuno 13' (Spain) Ángel Carrascosa 35'

2 June 2019	Preah Khan Reach Svay Rieng FC (Cambodia)	5 - 3	(Cambodia) Visakha	Svay Rieng Stadium, Svay Rieng Province
18:00 UTC+07:30	(Cambodia) Soeuy Visal 19' (Cameroon) Befolo Mbarga 29' (United States) Jonny Campbell 78' (South Korea) Yeon Gi-sung 85', 90+4'		(Brazil) Eliel da Cruz Guardiano 38' (pen.), 62' (North Korea) Pak Song-chol 50'

=== Week 11 ===
15 June 2019	Bati Youth (Cambodia)	0 - 3	(Cambodia) Nagaworld FC	Bati Academy Stadium, Takeo Province
15:30 UTC+07:30			(Turkmenistan) Amir Gurbani 55' (Cambodia) Khim Borey 62' (Rwanda) Atuheire Kipson 86'

15 June 2019	EDC FC (Cambodia)	0 - 5	(Cambodia) Phnom Penh Crown	EDC Stadium, Phnom Penh
15:30 UTC+07:30			(Brazil) Paulo Victor 23' (pen.) (Cambodia) Khun Udom 25' (o.g.) (Cambodia) Ouk Sothy 57' (Cambodia) Lim Pisoth 82' (Cambodia) Sath Rozak 90+3'

15 June 2019	Army FC (Cambodia)	1 - 2	(Cambodia) Preah Khan Reach Svay Rieng FC	RCAF Old Stadium, Phnom Penh
18:00 UTC+07:30	(Nigeria) George Bisan 52' (pen.)		(Cameroon) Befolo Mbarga 9' (Cambodia) Prak Mony Udom 15'

16 June 2019	Angkor Tiger (Cambodia)	2 - 0	(Cambodia) Kirivong Sok Sen Chey	Svay Thom Stadium, Siem Reap Province
15:30 UTC+07:30	(Argentina) Alexis Ramos 11' (Nigeria) Okereke Timothy 45+4'

16 June 2019	National Police Commissary FC (Cambodia)	1 - 2	(Cambodia) Boeung Ket FC	EDC Stadium, Phnom Penh
15:30 UTC+07:30	(South Africa) Shane Booysen 31' (pen.)		(Brazil) Dudu 14' (pen.) (Japan) Hikaru Mizuno 76'

16 June 2019	Kampong Cham FC (Cambodia)	0 - 6	(Cambodia) Soltilo Angkor	Bun Rany Hun Sen Memot Stadium, Kampong Cham Province
15:30 UTC+07:30			(Japan) Kento Fujihara 17' (Cambodia) Keo Sophal 19' (Cambodia) Ly Moslim 25', 45+2' (Cambodia) Sok Vatana 47' (Japan) Fumiya Kogure 53'

16 June 2019	Visakha (Cambodia)	1 - 3	(Cambodia) Asia Europe United	Visakha Stadium, Phnom Penh
18:00 UTC+07:30	(Cambodia) In Sodavid 8'		(Ivory Coast) Abdel Kader Coulibali 10' (Nigeria) Ajayi Opeyemi Korede 75', 90'

=== Week 12 ===
22 June 2019	Asia Europe United (Cambodia)	0 - 2	(Cambodia) Preah Khan Reach Svay Rieng FC	AEU Sport Park, Phnom Penh
15:30 UTC+07:30			(Cambodia) Nub Tola 62', 66'

22 June 2019	EDC FC (Cambodia)	0 - 3	(Cambodia) Army FC	EDC Stadium, Phnom Penh
15:30 UTC+07:30			(Nigeria) George Bisan 25', 51' (pen.) (Cambodia) Hour Bunlong 90+1'

22 June 2019	Phnom Penh Crown (Cambodia)	1 - 0	(Cambodia) Angkor Tiger	RSN Stadium, Phnom Penh
18:00 UTC+07:30	(Cambodia) Brak Thiva 70'

23 June 2019	Soltilo Angkor (Cambodia)	5 - 4	(Cambodia) Boeung Ket FC	Svay Thom Stadium, Siem Reap Province
15:30 UTC+07:30	(Cambodia) Prak Chanratana 30' (Cambodia) Roth Samnang 61' (Japan) Fumiya Kogure 62' (Cambodia) Keo Sophal 79' (Cambodia) Ly Moslim 89'		(Cambodia) Khoun Laboravy 2' (Cambodia) Mat Yamin 27' (Nigeria) Samuel Ajayi 31' (Cambodia) Mon Vannda 77'

23 June 2019	Kirivong Sok Sen Chey (Cambodia)	12 - 0	(Cambodia) Kampong Cham FC	Kirivong Stadium, Takeo Province
15:30 UTC+07:30	(Cambodia) Dav Nim 1', 27', 35', 58', 66', 86' (Cambodia) Chu Hav 16' (Cambodia) Nub Chanboraraksmey 33' (Cambodia) Ngor Borey 43' (Cambodia) Ya Ly 48' (o.g.) (Japan) Reiya Kinoshita 78' (pen.) (Cambodia) Chan Udom 84'

23 June 2019	National Police Commissary FC (Cambodia)	5 - 1	(Cambodia) Bati Youth	EDC Stadium, Phnom Penh
15:30 UTC+07:30	(Nigeria) Mathew Osa 21', 50', 55', 86' (Cambodia) Sous Chenda 85'		(Cambodia) Thy Leang 61'

23 June 2019	Nagaworld FC (Cambodia)	2 - 3	(Cambodia) Visakha	RCAF Old Stadium, Phnom Penh
18:00 UTC+07:30	(Cambodia) Tieng Tiny 45+7' (o.g.) (Nigeria) Esoh Paul Omogba 55'		(Cambodia) Keo Sokpheng 71' (North Korea) Pak Song-chol 73' (Cambodia) Sary Matnorotin 81'

=== Week 13 ===
29 June 2019	Bati Youth (Cambodia)	1 - 2	(Cambodia) Soltilo Angkor	Bati Academy Stadium, Takeo Province
15:30 UTC+07:30	(Cambodia) Seang Chanthea 90+2'		(Japan) Yuta Kikuchi 4' (Japan) Fumiya Kogure 31'

29 June 2019	Angkor Tiger (Cambodia)	3 - 1	(Cambodia) EDC FC	Svay Thom Stadium, Siem Reap Province
15:30 UTC+07:30	(Nigeria) Okereke Timothy 45' (Cambodia) Tang Sopheak 52' (Cambodia) Ham Panha 56'		(Cambodia) Moun Nara 34'

29 June 2019	Army FC (Cambodia)	4 - 1	(Cambodia) Asia Europe United	RCAF Old Stadium, Phnom Penh
18:00 UTC+07:30	(Cambodia) Khek Khemrin 29' (Nigeria) Ugochukwu Obi Moneke 55' (Cambodia) Reung Bunheing 88' (Cambodia) Yorm Vanna 90+3' (o.g.)		(Cambodia) Pin Saren 58'

30 June 2019	Kirivong Sok Sen Chey (Cambodia)	1 - 2	(Cambodia) Boeung Ket FC	Kirivong Stadium, Takeo Province
15:30 UTC+07:30	(Mali) Souleymane Coulibaly 56'		(Cambodia) Hong Pheng 20' (Cambodia) Tes Sambath 26'

30 June 2019	Kampong Cham FC (Cambodia)	2 - 17	(Cambodia) Phnom Penh Crown	RCAF Old Stadium, Phnom Penh
15:30 UTC+07:30	(Ghana) Soei Tutu Michael 20' (pen.) (Cambodia) Povry Moni Botra 90+3'		(Brazil) Paulo Victor 9', 15', 21', 36', 61', 76' (Cambodia) Va Sokthorn 44' (Cambodia) Brak Thiva 48', 52' (Cambodia) Lim Pisoth 57', 80', 89' (Cambodia) Mao Piseth 60' (Ghana) Soei Tutu Michael 82' (o.g.) (Cambodia) Ouk Sothy 90' (Cambodia) Neou Soksela 90+1' (Cambodia) Pov Ponvuthy 90+2'

30 June 2019	Preah Khan Reach Svay Rieng FC (Cambodia)	0 - 0	(Cambodia) Nagaworld FC	Svay Rieng Stadium, Svay Rieng Province
18:00 UTC+07:30

30 June 2019	Visakha (Cambodia)	3 - 1	(Cambodia) National Police Commissary FC	Visakha Stadium, Phnom Penh
18:00 UTC+07:30	(Brazil) Eliel da Cruz Guardiano 29', 45' (Cambodia) Cheng Meng 40'		(South Africa) Shane Booysen 58'

=== Week 14 ===
6 July 2019	Bati Youth (Cambodia)	0 - 1	(Cambodia) Kirivong Sok Sen Chey	Bati Academy Stadium, Takeo Province
15:30 UTC+07:30			(Japan) Reiya Kinoshita 83'

6 July 2019	Kampong Cham FC (Cambodia)	1 - 3	(Cambodia) EDC FC	RCAF Old Stadium, Phnom Penh
15:30 UTC+07:30	(Ghana) Soei Tutu Michael 45+2'		(Cambodia) Chhoeung Visnu 8' (Cambodia) Mao Bunchantha 58' (Cambodia) Sian Sopheaktra 90'

6 July 2019	Angkor Tiger (Cambodia)	3 - 1	(Cambodia) Army FC	Svay Thom Stadium, Siem Reap Province
15:30 UTC+07:30	(Japan) Ryota Hayashi 48' (Argentina) Alexis Ramos 70' (Nigeria) Okereke Timothy 78'		(Egypt) Mohamed Faeez 65'

7 July 2019	Soltilo Angkor (Cambodia)	2 - 3	(Cambodia) Visakha	Svay Thom Stadium, Siem Reap Province
15:30 UTC+07:30	(Cambodia) Ly Arifin 25' (Japan) Yuta Kikuchi 52'		(Cambodia) Sary Matnorotin 2' (Cambodia) Keo Sokpheng 29' (Brazil) Eliel da Cruz Guardiano 77'

7 July 2019	National Police Commissary FC (Cambodia)	0 - 2	(Cambodia) Preah Khan Reach Svay Rieng FC	EDC Stadium, Phnom Penh
18:00 UTC+07:30			(Cameroon) Befolo Mbarga 24', 60'

7 July 2019	Nagaworld FC (Cambodia)	6 - 1	(Cambodia) Asia Europe United	RCAF Old Stadium, Phnom Penh
18:00 UTC+07:30	(Rwanda) Atuheire Kipson 8', 42', 75', 90+2' (Turkmenistan) Amir Gurbani 32', 63'		(Cambodia) Pin Saren 52'

7 July 2019	Boeung Ket FC (Cambodia)	4 - 4	(Cambodia) Phnom Penh Crown	RSN Stadium, Phnom Penh
18:00 UTC+07:30	(Cambodia) Chan Vathanaka 14', 24' (Nigeria) Julius Oiboh 49', 63'		(South Africa) Shane Booysen 6', 31' (Nigeria) Dzarma Bata 48' (Cambodia) Mao Piseth 75'

=== Week 15 ===
13 July 2019	Asia Europe United (Cambodia)	1 - 1	(Cambodia) National Police Commissary FC	AEU Sport Park Stadium, Phnom Penh
15:30 UTC+07:30	(Ivory Coast) Abdel Kader Coulibali 50'		(Brazil) Souza E Silva Matheus 10'

13 July 2019	Kirivong Sok Sen Chey (Cambodia)	1 - 4	(Cambodia) Visakha	Kirivong Stadium, Takeo Province
15:30 UTC+07:30	(Brazil) Marcio Santos 80'		(Nigeria) Ajayi Opeyemi Korede 13', 24' (North Korea) Pak Song-chol 35' (Cambodia) Tieng Tiny 39'

13 July 2019	Army FC (Cambodia)	0 - 1	(Cambodia) Nagaworld FC	RCAF Old Stadium, Phnom Penh
18:00 UTC+07:30			(Cambodia) Kouch Dani 82'

14 July 2019	Angkor Tiger (Cambodia)	4 - 0	(Cambodia) Kampong Cham FC	Svay Thom Stadium, Siem Reap Province
15:30 UTC+07:30	(Nigeria) Okereke Timothy 38', 90+2' (Spain) Nando Cózar 86' (Argentina) Alexis Ramos 90+1'

14 July 2019	Boeung Ket FC (Cambodia)	4 - 0	(Cambodia) EDC FC	Cambodia Airway Stadium, Phnom Penh
15:30 UTC+07:30	(Nigeria) Samuel Ajayi 43', 89' (Cambodia) Chan Vathanaka 45' (Nigeria) Julius Oiboh 65'

14 July 2019	Phnom Penh Crown (Cambodia)	12 - 1	(Cambodia) Bati Youth	RSN Stadium, Phnom Penh
18:00 UTC+07:30	(Nigeria) Dzarma Bata 27', 36', 51', 72', 84' (pen.), 90+3' (pen.) (Brazil) Paulo Victor 44' (Cambodia) Yue Muslim 57' (Cambodia) Mao Piseth 73' (Cambodia) Lim Pisoth 74' (Cambodia) Chea Sokmeng 78' (o.g.) (Afghanistan) Mustafa Zazai 80'		(Cambodia) Seng Sambath 88'

14 July 2019	Preah Khan Reach Svay Rieng FC (Cambodia)	6 - 1	(Cambodia) Soltilo Angkor	Svay Rieng Stadium, Svay Rieng Province
18:00 UTC+07:30	(Cameroon) Befolo Mbarga 23', 53', 70', 75' (Cambodia) Hoy Phallin 43' (Cambodia) Prak Mony Udom 59'		(Cambodia) Ly Saroth 41'

=== Week 16 ===
20 July 2019	Soltilo Angkor (Cambodia)	0 - 1	(Cambodia) Asia Europe United	Svay Thom Stadium, Siem Reap Province
15:30 UTC+07:30			(Ivory Coast) Abdel Kader Coulibali 77'

20 July 2019	Bati Youth (Cambodia)	1 - 5	(Cambodia) EDC FC	Bati Youth Football Academy Stadium, Takeo Province
15:30 UTC+07:30	(Cambodia) Ean Pisey 14'		(Cambodia) Chhoeung Visnu 5' (pen.) (Cambodia) Mao Bunchantha 22' (Cambodia) Moun Nara 27' (Cambodia) Nop David 78' (Cambodia) Chantha Chantika 89'

20 July 2019	Boeung Ket FC (Cambodia)	1 - 1	(Cambodia) Angkor Tiger	Cambodia Airway Stadium, Phnom Penh
15:30 UTC+07:30	(Cambodia) Chan Vathanaka 36'		(Cambodia) Tang Sopheak 82'

21 July 2019	Kampong Cham FC (Cambodia)	2 - 4	(Cambodia) Army FC	RCAF Old Stadium, Phnom Penh
15:30 UTC+07:30	(Ghana) Soei Tutu Michael 22' (Cambodia) Povry Moni Botra 47'		(South Korea) NA HYOSUNG 14' (Nigeria) George Bisan 61', 68' (Cambodia) Reung Bunheing 84'

21 July 2019	National Police Commissary FC (Cambodia)	1 - 3	(Cambodia) Nagaworld FC	EDC Stadium, Phnom Penh
15:30 UTC+07:30	(Cambodia) Mit Samael 33'		(Cambodia) Sos Suhana 28' (Rwanda) Atuheire Kipson 49', 72' (pen.)

21 July 2019	Preah Khan Reach Svay Rieng FC (Cambodia)	2 - 1	(Cambodia) Kirivong Sok Sen Chey	Svay Rieng Stadium, Svay Rieng Province
18:00 UTC+07:30	(South Korea) Yeon Gi-sung 45' (Cambodia) Sareth Krya 47'		(Cambodia) Chu Hav 53'

21 July 2019	Visakha (Cambodia)	4 - 3	(Cambodia) Phnom Penh Crown	Visakha Stadium, Phnom Penh
18:00 UTC+07:30	(Brazil) Eliel da Cruz Guardiano 18' (Nigeria) Ajayi Opeyemi Korede 43', 75' (Cambodia) Sin Kakada 80'		(Afghanistan) Mustafa Zazai 58' (Brazil) Paulo Victor 74' (Nigeria) Dzarma Bata 90'

=== Week 17 ===
27 July 2019	Angkor Tiger (Cambodia)	8 - 3	(Cambodia) Bati Youth	Svay Thom Stadium, Siem Reap Province
15:30 UTC+07:30	(Cambodia) Chhong Bunnath 4' (Spain) Nando Cózar 12' (Nigeria) Okereke Timothy 18', 38' (Cambodia) Im Vinun 23' (o.g.) (Argentina) Alexis Ramos 42', 48', 76'		(Cambodia) Sieng Chanthea 50', 68' (Cambodia) Chea Sokmeng 90+3'

27 July 2019	EDC FC (Cambodia)	0 - 7	(Cambodia) Visakha	EDC Stadium, Phnom Penh
15:30 UTC+07:30			(Cambodia) Keo Sokpheng 12' (Nigeria) Ajayi Opeyemi Korede 23', 48', 50' (Brazil) Eliel da Cruz Guardiano 54' (pen.), 77' (Cambodia) Sin Kakada 90+3' (pen.)

27 July 2019	Army FC (Cambodia)	3 - 2	(Cambodia) National Police Commissary FC	RCAF Old Stadium, Phnom Penh
18:30 UTC+07:30	(Nigeria) George Bisan 30', 88' (Cambodia) Reung Bunheing 53'		(Brazil) Matheus Souza e Silva 71', 76'

28 July 2019	Boeung Ket FC (Cambodia)	4 - 0	(Cambodia) Kampong Cham FC	Cambodia Airway Stadium, Phnom Penh
15:30 UTC+07:30	(Brazil) Dudu 9', 13', 54' (Nigeria) Samuel Ajayi 90+2'

28 July 2019	Kirivong Sok Sen Chey (Cambodia)	2 - 0	(Cambodia) Asia Europe United	Kirivong Stadium, Takeo Province
15:30 UTC+07:30	(Cambodia) Dav Nim 12' (Mali) Souleymane Coulibaly 90+4'

28 July 2019	Nagaworld FC (Cambodia)	3 - 0	(Cambodia) Soltilo Angkor	RCAF Old Stadium, Phnom Penh
18:30 UTC+07:30	(Cambodia) Sos Suhana 13' (Nigeria) Esoh Paul Omogba 17' (Rwanda) Atuheire Kipson 54'

28 July 2019	Phnom Penh Crown (Cambodia)	2 - 5	(Cambodia) Preah Khan Reach Svay Rieng FC	RSN Stadium, Phnom Penh
18:00 UTC+07:30	(Nigeria) Dzarma Bata 8' (Brazil) Paulo Victor 77'		(Cambodia) Soun Sovan 26' (Cambodia) Sareth Krya 45' (United States) Jonny Campbell 54' (Cameroon) Befolo Mbarga 61' (Cambodia) Hoy Phallin 63'

=== Week 18 ===
3 August 2019	Bati Youth (Cambodia)	0 - 1	(Cambodia) Kampong Cham FC	Bati Youth Football Academy Stadium, Takeo Province
15:30 UTC+07:30			(Cambodia) Vankrey Vanny 64'

3 August 2019	Boeung Ket FC (Cambodia)	4 - 3	(Cambodia) Army FC	Cambodia Airway Stadium, Phnom Penh
15:30 UTC+07:30	(Nigeria) Julius Oiboh 23' (Brazil) Dudu 26' (Cambodia) Ly Mizan 50' (Nigeria) Samuel Ajayi 64'		(South Korea) NA HYOSUNG 3' (Cambodia) Reung Bunheing 43' (Egypt) Mohamed Faeez 48'

3 August 2019	Visakha (Cambodia)	2 - 1	(Cambodia) Angkor Tiger	Visakha Stadium, Phnom Penh
18:00 UTC+07:30	(Nigeria) Ajayi Opeyemi Korede 41', 52'		(Cambodia) Chhom Pisa 38'

4 August 2019	Soltilo Angkor (Cambodia)	0 - 0	(Cambodia) National Police Commissary FC	Svay Thom Stadium, Siem Reap Province
15:30 UTC+07:30

4 August 2019	Asia Europe United (Cambodia)	3 - 4	(Cambodia) Phnom Penh Crown	AEU Sport Park Stadium, Phnom Penh
15:30 UTC+07:30	(Ivory Coast) Abdel Kader Coulibali 6' (Cameroon) Ndoumene Yannick Francois 31' (Cambodia) Yorm Vanna 54'		(South Africa) Shane Booysen 4', 32' (Nigeria) Dzarma Bata 21' (Cambodia) Mao Piseth 43'

4 August 2019	Nagaworld FC (Cambodia)	0 - 2	(Cambodia) Kirivong Sok Sen Chey	RCAF Old Stadium, Phnom Penh
18:00 UTC+07:30			(Cambodia) Dav Nim 50' (Mali) Souleymane Coulibaly 90'

4 August 2019	Preah Khan Reach Svay Rieng FC (Cambodia)	7 - 0	(Cambodia) EDC FC	Svay Rieng Stadium, Svay Rieng Province
18:00 UTC+07:30	(Cambodia) Sareth Krya 11' (Cameroon) Befolo Mbarga 31', 34', 62', 85' (South Korea) Yeon Gi-sung 50' (Cambodia) Hoy Phallin 70'

=== Week 19 ===
10 August 2019	Kampong Cham FC (Cambodia)	0 - 2	(Cambodia) Visakha	RCAF Old Stadium, Phnom Penh
15:30 UTC+07:30

10 August 2019	EDC FC (Cambodia)	1 - 2	(Cambodia) Asia Europe United	EDC Stadium, Phnom Penh
15:30 UTC+07:30

10 August 2019	Boeung Ket FC (Cambodia)	6 - 0	(Cambodia) Bati Youth	Cambodia Airway Stadium, Phnom Penh
15:30 UTC+07:30

10 August 2019	Phnom Penh Crown (Cambodia)	2 - 2	(Cambodia) Nagaworld FC	RSN Stadium, Phnom Penh
18:00 UTC+07:30

11 August 2019	Angkor Tiger (Cambodia)	1 - 1	(Cambodia) Preah Khan Reach Svay Rieng FC	Svay Thom Stadium, Siem Reap Province
15:30 UTC+07:30

11 August 2019	Kirivong Sok Sen Chey (Cambodia)	1 - 3	(Cambodia) National Police Commissary FC	Kirivong Stadium, Takeo Province
15:30 UTC+07:30

11 August 2019	Army FC (Cambodia)	2 - 0	(Cambodia) Soltilo Angkor	RCAF Old Stadium, Phnom Penh
18:00 UTC+07:30

== Top scorers ==
Rank	Player	Club	Goals
1	(Cameroon) Befolo Mbarga	Preah Khan Reach Svay Rieng FC	36
2	(Nigeria) Dzarma Bata	Phnom Penh Crown FC / Army FC	35
3	(Nigeria) Ajayi Opeyemi Korede	Visakha / Asia Europe United	27
4	(Brazil) Eliel da Cruz Guardiano	Visakha	25
5	(Nigeria) Okereke Timothy	Angkor Tiger	23
6	(Rwanda) Atuheire Kipson	Nagaworld FC	22
8	(Brazil) Paulo Victor	Phnom Penh Crown FC	19
8	(Nigeria) Esoh Paul Omogba	Nagaworld FC	19
10	(Nigeria) George Bisan	Army FC	18
10	(South Africa) Shane Booysen	Phnom Penh Crown FC / National Police	18

== Clean sheets ==
Rank	Player	Club	Clean sheets
1	(Cambodia) Sou Yaty	Nagaworld FC	10
2	(Cambodia) Aim Sovannarath	Preah Khan Reach Svay Rieng FC	8
3	(Cambodia) Chea Vansak	Visakha	5
3	(Cambodia) Oeun Sam At	Kirivong Sok Sen Chey FC	5
5	(Cambodia) Saveng Samnang	Phnom Penh Crown	4
5	(Cambodia) Hem Simay	Angkor Tiger	4
7	(Cambodia) Um Vichet	Army FC	3
7	(Cambodia) Alex You	Boeung Ket FC	3
7	(Cambodia) Yok Ary	Soltilo Angkor	3
7	(Cambodia) Hul Kimhuy	Boeung Ket FC	3

== Awards ==
Awards	Nation/Name	Club
Top Scorer	(Cameroon) Befolo Mbarga	Preah Khan Reach
Player of the season	(Cameroon) Befolo Mbarga	Preah Khan Reach
Goalkeeper of the season	(Cambodia) Aim Sovannarath	Preah Khan Reach
Coach of the season	(Republic of Ireland) Conor Nestor	Preah Khan Reach

Awards	Club
Fair Play	Bati Youth

== See also ==
- 2019 Hun Sen Cup
