= 2018 Hun Sen Cup =

Tournament details
- Country: Cambodia
- Dates: 7 Mar – 6 Oct 2018
- Teams: 34

Final positions
- Champions: National Defense
- Runners-up: Police Commissary

Tournament statistics
- Top goal scorer: Noun Borey (9 goals)

Awards
- Best player: Noun Borey

The Hun Sen Cup was the main football knockout tournament in Cambodia. The 2018 Hun Sen Cup was the 12th season of the Hun Sen Cup, the premier knockout tournament for association football clubs in Cambodia involving Cambodian League and provincial teams organized by the Football Federation of Cambodia.

Preah Khan Reach Svay Rieng were the defending champions, having beaten Nagaworld 3–0 in the previous season's final.

Hun Sen Cup 2018 divided into two stages, regional stage and national stage. 22 teams from the Capital and provinces playing in regional stage. 16 teams playing in national stage, 12 teams from Cambodian League with the last four teams from semi-finals of regional stage.

== Regional stage ==
=== Group stage ===
Each group was played on a single round-robin basis at the pre-selected hosts. Mondul Kiri directed to round of 16 due to only one team in Group C. Group winners, runners-up, third places and the best three fourth-placed team advanced to round of 16.

==== Group A ====
Pos	Team	Pld	W	D	L	GF	GA	GD	Pts
1	Pailin	3	2	1	0	2	0	+2	7
2	Kirivong Sok Sen Chey	3	1	2	0	8	1	+7	5
3	Battambang	3	1	1	1	4	4	0	4
4	Kampong Chhnanag	3	0	0	3	2	11	−9	0

==== Group B ====
Pos	Team	Pld	W	D	L	GF	GA	GD	Pts
1	Kampong Cham	5	3	2	0	18	7	+11	11
2	National Defense Youth	5	3	1	1	19	4	+15	10
3	Thbong Khmum	5	3	0	2	16	4	+12	9
4	Prei Veng	5	2	1	2	17	9	+8	7
5	Kandal	5	1	2	2	9	10	−1	5
6	Takeo	5	0	0	5	3	48	−45	0

==== Group C ====
Pos	Team	Pld	W	D	L	GF	GA	GD	Pts
1	Mondul Kiri	0	0	0	0	0	0	0	0

==== Group D ====
Pos	Team	Pld	W	D	L	GF	GA	GD	Pts
1	Football Academy U18	4	3	1	0	16	2	+14	10
2	Sihanoukville	4	2	1	1	5	8	−3	7
3	Koh Kong	4	2	0	2	9	7	+2	6
4	Kampot	4	2	0	2	7	8	−1	6
5	Kep	4	0	0	4	1	13	−12	0

==== Group E ====
Pos	Team	Pld	W	D	L	GF	GA	GD	Pts
1	Siem Reap	5	3	1	1	9	5	+4	10
2	CMAC United	5	3	1	1	8	1	+7	10
3	Kampong Thom	5	3	0	2	8	6	+2	9
4	Oddar Meanchey	5	2	3	0	13	9	+4	9
5	Banteay Meanchey	5	0	2	3	3	11	−8	2
6	Preah Vihear	5	0	1	4	3	6	−3	1

=== Round of 16 ===
25 April 2018
15:00

Mondol Kiri	5 – 2	Pailin

Mondol Kiri Stadium
25 April 2018
15:00

Koh Kong	0 – 0	Thbong Khmum
Penalties
	4–3

Koh Kong Stadium
25 April 2018
15:00

Prei Veng	5 – 2	Kampong Thom

Prei Veng Stadium
25 April 2018
15:00

Kampong Cham	3 – 1	Siem Reap

Kampong Cham Stadium
25 April 2018
15:00

Kirivong Sok Sen Chey	4 – 0	National Defense Youth

Kirivong FC Stadium
25 April 2018
15:00

CMAC United	2 – 0	Sihanoukville

Olympic National Stadium
25 April 2018
15:00

Oddar Meanchey	1 – 3	Football Academy U18

Oddar Meanchey Stadium
25 April 2018
15:00

Kampot	4 – 0	Battambang

Kampot Stadium

=== Quarter-finals ===
2 May 2018
15:00

Koh Kong	3 – 1	Prei Veng

Koh Kong Stadium
2 May 2018
15:00

Football Academy U18	4 – 0	CMAC United

Tonle Bati National Football Center
2 May 2018
15:00

Kampot	3 – 2	Mondol Kiri

Kampot Stadium
2 May 2018
15:00

Kampong Cham	1 – 3	Kirivong Sok Sen Chey

Kampong Cham Stadium

=== Semi-finals ===
12 May 2018
15:00

Kirivong Sok Sen Chey	3 – 1	Kampot

Olympic National Stadium
12 May 2018
18:00

Koh Kong	1 – 2	Football Academy U18

Olympic National Stadium

=== Finals ===
23 May 2018
17:30

Kirivong Sok Sen Chey	1 – 2	Football Academy U18

Army Stadium

=== Awards ===
- Top goal scorer : Keo Naro of National Defense Ministry Youth (12 goals)
- Best goalkeeper : Hul Kimhuy of National Football Academy U18
- Best coach : Musashi Mizushima of National Football Academy U18

== National stage ==
In national stage, matches start from round of 16 and play home-away basis.

=== Round of 16 ===
==== First leg ====
11 July 2018	Soltilo Angkor	2 − 2	Angkor Tiger	Siem Reap Stadium
15:30

11 July 2018	Western Phnom Penh	1 − 5	Boeung Ket	Western Stadium
15:30

11 July 2018	Preah Khan Reach	1 − 0	Visakha	Svay Rieng Stadium
18:30

11 July 2018	EDC	1 − 2	Phnom Penh Crown	EDC Stadium
15:30

11 July 2018	Nagaworld	5 − 1	Kampot	Army Stadium
15:30

11 July 2018	National Defense	3 − 1	Asia Euro United	Army Stadium
18:30

11 July 2018	Police Commissary	2 − 2	Kirivong Sok Sen Chey	Olympic National Stadium
18:30

22 July 2018	Football Academy U18	4 − 1	Koh Kong	Football Academy Stadium
15:30

==== Second leg ====
18 July 2018	Angkor Tiger	1 − 0 (3 − 2 agg.)	Soltilo Angkor	Siem Reap Stadium
15:30

18 July 2018	Boeung Ket	1 − 0 (6 − 1 agg.)	Western Phnom Penh	Olympic National Stadium
18:30

18 July 2018	Visakha	1 − 1 (1 − 2 agg.)	Preah Khan Reach	Army Stadium
18:30

18 July 2018	Phnom Penh Crown	4 − 0 (6 − 1 agg.)	EDC	RSN Stadium
18:30

18 July 2018	Kampot	1 − 1 (2 − 6 agg.)	Nagaworld	Kampot Stadium
15:30

18 July 2018	Asia Euro United	1 − 7 (2 − 10 agg.)	National Defense	AEU Sport Park
15:30

18 July 2018	Kirivong Sok Sen Chey	0 − 1 (2 − 3 agg.)	Police Commissary	Takeo Stadium
15:30

28 July 2018	Koh Kong	0 − 1 (1 − 5 agg.)	Football Academy U18	Koh Kong Stadium
15:30

=== Quarter-finals ===
==== First leg ====
1 Aug 2018	Angkor Tiger	0 − 3	Phnom Penh Crown	Siem Reap Stadium
15:30		Report	In Sodavid 2'; Brak Thiva 5', 45'

1 Aug 2018	Police Commissary	3 − 0	Football Academy U18	Olympic National Stadium
15:30	Sous Chenda 45'; Chey Chetra 55', 90+3'	Report

1 Aug 2018	Nagaworld	2 − 0	Boeung Ket	Army Stadium
15:30	Run Rany 45+2'; Sary Matnorotin 84'	Report

1 Aug 2018	National Defense	1 − 2	Preah Khan Reach	Army Stadium
18:30	Sok Heang 32' (pen.)	Report	Hoy Phallin 27'; Sareth Krya 62'

==== Second leg ====
8 Aug 2018	Phnom Penh Crown	1 − 4 (a.e.t.) (4 − 4 agg.) (3–4 p)	Angkor Tiger	RSN Stadium
18:30	Sin Kakada 111'	Report	Pich Sovankhamarin 7', 52'; Pov Phearith 90', 120+3'
	Penalties
	Kim Chhaya (penalty missed); Ouk Sothy (penalty scored) ? (penalty scored); Yue Safy (penalty scored); Sin Kakada (penalty missed)		(penalty scored) Pov Phearith; (penalty scored) Pich Sovankhamarin; (penalty missed) Chay Rothserey; (penalty scored) ? (penalty scored) ?

8 Aug 2018	Football Academy U18	1 − 6 (1 − 9 agg.)	Police Commissary	Football Academy Stadium
15:30	Teath Kimheng 82'	Report	Sous Chenda 44'; Noun Borey 55', 85', 88'; Ol Ravy 69'; Chey Chetra 90'

8 July 2018	Boeung Ket	3 − 1 (a.e.t.) (3 − 3 agg.) (2 – 3 p)	Nagaworld	Olympic National Stadium
18:30	Ly Mizan 50'; Khun Sengthai 69'; Sun Sovannrithy 90+4' (pen.)	Report	Suong Virak 11'
	Penalties
	Sun Sovannrithy (penalty missed); Ly Mizan (penalty scored); Hong Pheng (penalty scored); Mat Yamin (penalty missed); Ke Vannak (penalty missed)		(penalty missed) Dani Kouch; (penalty scored) Kouch Sokumpheak; (penalty scored) Sos Suhana; (penalty scored) Khim Borey

8 Aug 2018	Preah Khan Reach	1 − 2 (a.e.t.) (3 − 3 agg.) (4–5 p)	National Defense	Svay Rieng Stadium
18:30	Hoy Phallin 45'	Report	Chhin Chhoeun 6'; Sok Heang 33'
	Penalties
	Prak Mony Udom (penalty scored); Nen Sothearoth (penalty scored); Nub Tola (penalty scored); Om Oudom (penalty scored); Soun Sovan (penalty missed)		(penalty scored) Sok Heang; (penalty scored) Reung Bunheing; (penalty scored) Um Sereyroth; (penalty scored) Khek Khemrin; (penalty scored) Op Kamol

=== Semi-finals ===
1 September 2018
18:30

Nagaworld	1 – 3 (a.e.t.)	National Defense
Nhim Sovannara 9'	Report	Sok Heang 31'; Sor Piseth 94'; Chhin Chhoeun 117'

Olympic National Stadium, Phnom Penh
2 September 2018
18:30

Angkor Tiger	0 – 2	Police Commissary
	Report	Noun Borey 32'; Lun Chamroeun 72'

Olympic National Stadium, Phnom Penh

=== Finals ===
6 October 2018

National Defense	3 – 0	Police Commissary
Khek Khemrin 18'; Phuong Soksana 87', 90'	Report

Olympic National Stadium, Phnom Penh

=== Awards ===
- Top goal scorer : Noun Borey of Police Commissary (9 goals)
- Player of the season : Noun Borey of Police Commissary
- Goalkeeper of the Season : Um Sereyroth of National Defense
- Coach of the season : Phea Sopheaktra of National Defense
- Fair Play: Police Commissary

== See also ==
- 2018 Cambodian League
