= 2021 Hun Sen Cup =

Tournament details
- Country: Cambodia
- Venue(s): RSN Stadium, Phnom Penh
- Dates: 16 February – 25 November 2021
- Teams: 34

Final positions
- Champions: Visakha (2nd title)
- Runners-up: Preah Khan Reach
- Third place: Boeung Ket

Tournament statistics
- Top goal scorer: Keo Sokpheng (7 goals)

Awards
- Best player: Ouk Sovann

The 2021 Hun Sen Cup is the 15th season of the Hun Sen Cup, the premier football knockout tournament in Cambodia, for association football clubs in Cambodia involving Cambodian League and provincial teams organized by the Football Federation of Cambodia. Visakha won the cup after beating Nagaworld 2-0 in the 2020 final. It was Visakha's first time winning the cup. The competition is split into 2 stages, provincial stage and national stage. The top three teams from provincial stage will enter the national stage with the 13 teams in Cambodian League 2021.

== Provincial stage ==
=== Provincial stage semi-finals ===
20 October 2021
15:00

| Battambang | 0 – 3 walkover | Tbong Khmum |

Prince Stadium
- Note: Due to positive cases of Covid-19 for two players of Battambang FC before Octerber 18, and two more players of Battambang FC before the match started, Cambodian National Competitions Committee (CNCC) cancel the match and the winning result will be given to Tboung Khumum FC.

20 October 2021
15:00

| Banteay Meanchey | 0 – 1 | Koh Kong |

AEU Sport Park

=== Provincial stage finals ===
23 October 2021
15:00

| Tbong Khmum | 0 – 3 | Koh Kong |

Cambodia Airways Stadium

=== Provincial stage awards ===
- Top goal scorer : Tha Kriya of Battambang FC (10 goals)
- Best coach : Hok Sochivorn of Koh Kong FC
- Best goalkeeper : Kendeth Sotheavathana of Koh Kong FC

== National stage ==
=== Round of 16 ===
9 November 2021
15:00

| Nagaworld | 1 – 1 | National Police |
Penalties
| | 4-2 |

Army Stadium
9 November 2021
15:00

| Visakha | 8 – 0 | Banteay Meanchey |

Prince Stadium
9 November 2021
18:00

| Phnom Penh Crown | 7 – 0 | Tbong Khmum |

Smart RSN Stadium
9 November 2021
18:00

| Preah Khan Reach | 6 – 1 | Koh Kong |

Svay Rieng Stadium
10 November 2021
15:00

| Boeung Ket | 4 – 0 | Soltilo Angkor |

Cambodia Airways Stadium
10 November 2021
15:00

| Tiffy Army | 0 – 4 | Electricite du Cambodge |

Army Stadium
10 November 2021
15:00

| Angkor Tiger | 2 – 0 | Prey Veng |

SRU Stadium
10 November 2021
15:00

| Kirivong Sok Sen Chey | 2 – 3 | Asia Euro United |

Kirivong Stadium

=== Quarter-finals ===
16 November 2021
15:00

| Visakha | 6 – 0 | Asia Euro United |
|---|---|---|
| Keo Sokpheng 22', 28', 61'; Tith Dina 42'; In Sodavid 58'; Teath Kimheng 63' (pen.) |

Prince Stadium, Phnom Penh
Attendance: 452
16 November 2021
15:00

| Nagaworld | 2 – 2 | Boeung Ket |
|---|---|---|
| Kouch Sokumpheak 4'; Nub Tola 85' | | Chan Vathanaka 89', 90+3' |
Penalties
| Sos Suhana (penalty scored); Khim Borey (penalty scored); Ream Serng (penalty scored); Samoeun Pidor (penalty scored); Sary Matnorotin (penalty scored); Keo Oudom (penalty scored); Na Bunneth (penalty scored); Yet Chetra (penalty missed) | 7 - 8 | (penalty scored) Sath Rosib; (penalty scored) Soeuth Nava; (penalty scored) Pom Barang; (penalty scored) Mat Noron; (penalty scored) Chan Vathanaka; (penalty scored) Vang Davin; (penalty scored) Sao Vaify; (penalty scored) Taing Bunchhay |

Army Stadium, Phnom Penh
Attendance: 459
16 November 2021
18:00

| Phnom Penh Crown | 1 – 0 | Electricite du Cambodge |
|---|---|---|
| Sam Ol Tina 74' |

Smart RSN Stadium, Phnom Penh
Attendance: 331
16 November 2021
18:00

| Preah Khan Reach | 3 – 0 | Angkor Tiger |
|---|---|---|
| Sareth Krya 5'; Ean Pisey 8'; Soun Sovan 81' (pen.) |

Svay Rieng Stadium

=== Semi-finals ===
22 November 2021
15:00

| Beoung Ket | 1 – 2 | Visakha |
|---|---|---|
| Soeuth Nava 17' | | Keo Sokpheng 60'; Chrerng Polroth 75' |

Cambodia Airways Stadium
Attendance: 1,250

22 November 2021
18:00

| Preah Khan Reach | 3 – 2 | Phnom Penh Crown |
|---|---|---|
| Soeuy Visal 20'; Sareth Krya 78'; Mon Vannda 85' | | Brak Thiva 25' (pen.); Mao Piseth 38' |

Svay Rieng Stadium, Phnom Penh
Attendance: 1,560

=== Third place play-off ===
25 November 2021
15:00

| Boeung Ket | 2 – 0 | Phnom Penh Crown |
|---|---|---|
| San Kimheng 44'; Vang Davin 49' |

Smart RSN Stadium, Phnom Penh
Attendance: 2,630

=== Final ===
25 November 2021
18:00

| Visakha | 2 – 2 (a.e.t.) | Preah Khan Reach |
|---|---|---|
| Wut Tola 71'; Ouk Sovann 105+1' | | Prak Mony Udom 53'; Chou Sinti 100' |
Penalties
| Tith Dina (penalty scored); En Vicchay (penalty scored); Sin Sophanat (penalty scored); In Sodavid (penalty scored); Ouk Sovann (penalty scored) | 5 – 4 | (penalty scored) Soeuy Visal; (penalty scored) Sareth Krya; (penalty scored) Ean Pisey; (penalty missed) Soun Sovan; (penalty scored) Tray Vichet |

Smart RSN Stadium, Phnom Penh
Attendance: 5,000
Referee: Ouseyha Khin

=== Awards ===
- Top goal scorer : Keo Sokpheng of Visakha (7 goals)
- Best goalkeeper : Keo Soksela of Visakha
- Best player : Ouk Sovann of Visakha
- Best coach : Akeeb Tunji Ayoyinka of Visakha
- Fair play : Phnom Penh Crown

== See also ==
- 2021 C-League
