= Márcio Santos (disambiguation) =

Márcio Santos (born 1969) is a Brazilian former football defender and 1994 World Cup winner

Márcio Santos may also refer to:

- Márcio Santos (footballer, born 1979), Portuguese football goalkeeper
- Marcio Santos (footballer, born 1987), Brazilian football midfielder
- Márcio Santos (footballer, born 1998), Portuguese football forward
- Márcio Santos (basketball), Brazilian basketball forward-center
