= Sareth =

Sareth may refer to:

- Sareth Krya, a Cambodian professional footballer
- Sareth (character), a fictional character from the 2021 TV series Foundation
