= Conor Nestor =

Irish football manager (born 1984)

Personal information
- Full name: Conor Laurence Nestor
- Date of birth: 17 April 1984 (age 42)
- Place of birth: Limerick, Ireland

Team information
- Current team: ISI Dangkor Senchey (Head coach)

Managerial career
- Years: Team
- 2014–2015: Limerick U19
- 2018–2023: Preah Khan Reach Svay Rieng
- 2023: Hyderabad
- 2024: Selangor (assistant)
- 2024–2026: Boeung Ket
- 2025: Cambodia Women
- 2026–: ISI Dangkor Senchey

Conor Laurence Nestor (born 17 April 1984) is an Irish professional football manager. He is currently the manager of Cambodian Premier League club ISI Dangkor Senchey and the Cambodia Women's National Football Team. He earned his Pro license with the Football Association of Ireland, where he previously worked as a Football Development Officer.

Under Nestor guidance, Preah Khan Reach Svay Rieng won the 2019 C-League and ended up winning the 'Coach of the Season' award.

== Honours ==
=== Club ===
==== Preah Khan Reach Svay Rieng ====
- C-League: 2019

=== Individual ===
- 2019 Cambodian League 'Coach of the Season'
