= 2000 Cambodian League =

Cambodian League
- Season: 2000
- Champions: Nokorbal Cheat

The 2000 Cambodian League season is the 19th season of top-tier football in Cambodia. Statistics of the Cambodian League for the 2000 season.

== Overview ==
It was contested by 10 teams. The top four teams qualified to the Championship play-off and Nokorbal Cheat won the championship.

== League standings ==
Pos	Team	Pld	W	D	L	GF	GA	GD	Pts
1	Nokorbal Cheat	18	14	3	1	52	18	+34	45
2	Kang Yothipoi Khemara Phumin	18	12	1	5	38	21	+17	37
3	Keila Rith	18	8	5	5	30	20	+10	29
4	Sala Vekvoeun Yothes	18	8	5	5	31	24	+7	29
5	Nokorbal Krung Phnom Penh	18	7	7	4	32	21	+11	28
6	Kangtorp Choeung Tek	18	7	5	6	40	27	+13	26
7	Prey Veng	18	5	2	11	32	49	−17	17
8	Khemara	18	5	1	12	30	58	−28	16
9	Kampot	18	4	3	11	18	40	−22	15
10	Siem Reap	18	2	4	12	11	39	−28	10

Source: RSSSF

== Championship play-off ==
=== Semi-finals ===
02 Dec 2000 Nokorbal Cheat 3-2 Sala Vekvoeun Yothes

09 Dec 2000 Kang Yothipoi KP 1-2 Keila Rith

=== Third place ===
16 Dec 2000 Sala Vekvoeun Yothes 3-1 Kang Yothipoi KP

=== Final ===
16 Dec 2000 Nokorbal Cheat 2-0 Kelia Rith
