= Paulo Victor (footballer, born 1994) =

Brazilian footballer

Personal information
- Full name: Paulo Victor Costa Soares
- Date of birth: 13 September 1994 (age 32)
- Place of birth: São Luís, Brazil
- Height: 1.80 m (5 ft 11 in)
- Position: Forward

Senior career*
Years	Team	Apps	(Gls)
2016	Goyang Zaicro	23	(2)
2018	Nacional de Muriaé	7	(0)
2019–2020	Phnom Penh Crown	31	(25)
2020–2021	Al-Hidd	0	(0)
2021–2022	Vitória	0	(0)
2022	Visakha	17	(15)
2023	Persebaya Surabaya	29	(8)
2024–2025	Al-Hudood	7	(1)
2025	Al-Naft	12	(0)
- * Club domestic league appearances and goals as of 23 October 2025

Paulo Victor Costa Soares (born 13 September 1994) is a Brazilian professional footballer who plays as a forward.

== Club career ==
Paulo Victor began playing football América Futebol Clube (RN)'s youth system. He played professionally with Goyang Zaicro in Korea during 2016, before joining Nacional Atlético Clube (MG) in January 2018.

In 2019, Soares signed for Phnom Penh Crown in the C-League, and made his debut against Boeung Ket Angkor in the first game of the season when he scored his first goal for the club despite his team going down 3:2.
