= George Bisan =

Nigerian professional football forward

Personal information
- Date of birth: 30 January 1992 (age 34)
- Place of birth: Kaduna, Nigeria
- Height: 1.86 m (6 ft 1 in)
- Position: Striker

Youth career
- Waco Boys

Senior career*
Years	Team	Apps	(Gls)
- Maracana FC
2012–2013	Boeung Ket Angkor		(18)
2012	→Chllam Samuth(loan)		(14)
2013–2016	Phnom Penh Crown		(44)
2016	Than Quang Ninh	9	(1)
2016	Phnom Penh Crown	6	(4)
2017	Asia Euro United		
2017	Preah Khan Reach Svay Rieng		
2018	Nagaworld	12	(28)
2019	National Defense Ministry	-	(-)
2020	Nagaworld	4	(0)
2020	Asia Euro United	6	(1)
- * Club domestic league appearances and goals

George Bisan (born 30 January 1992) is a Nigerian professional footballer who plays as a forward.

== Early life and career ==
Born in Kaduna, Nigeria, he moved with his family to Abuja at age four. Years later, he attended the Federal Science and Technical College Kafanchan and went on to play for Maracana FC. However, he was benched regularly because of his young age He was a Star player for De Marshal FC of Orozo Abuja Where he flourished In a midfield partnership with Muhammed Nurat. George Bisan is Known for His Strength, Pace, Shot Power and Powerful Tackles and some people liked him to Yaya Toure.

== Professional career ==
Signed by Phnom Penh Crown in winter 2013, he formed a strike partnership with Shane Booysen that netted 47 goals in 2015. Next, he moved to Than Quang Ninh of Vietnam in 2016 and quickly settled into the country.

As injury ramifications forced him to miss out a few matches, he was not able to contribute much to the club and they cancelled his contract by May 2016.

== Personal life ==
Bisan entered a Facebook photo competition during his time with Than Quang Ninh.
