= Kampong Cham FC =

Cambodian football club

- Full name: Kampong Cham Football Club
- Ground: Bun Rany Hun Sen Memot Stadium
- Coach: Thol Kosal
- League: Cambodian League
- 2019: Relegated
- Website: https://cambodianfootball.com/team/kampong-cham/
Home colours	Away colours

Kampong Cham Football Club (Khmer: ក្លឹបបាល់ទាត់ខេត្តកំពង់ចាម, Klœ̆b Băltoăt Khétt Kâmpóng Cham; lit. 'Football Club of Kampong Cham Province') is a football club based in Kampong Cham Province, Cambodia. The club was invited by the FFC to compete in the 2019 Cambodian League, the top division of Cambodian football.
