= Márcio Santos (footballer, born 1998) =

Portuguese footballer

Personal information
- Full name: Márcio Alexandre Santos Machado
- Date of birth: 18 May 1998 (age 28)
- Place of birth: Paredes, Portugal
- Height: 1.71 m (5 ft 7 in)
- Position: Forward

Team information
- Current team: São João Ver

Senior career*
| Years | Team | Apps | (Gls) |
| 2017–2020 | Penafiel | 12 | (0) |
| 2019 | → Cinfães (loan) | 6 | (2) |
| 2020–2021 | Sanjoanense | 26 | (1) |
| 2021– | São João Ver | | |
- * Club domestic league appearances and goals as of 4 September 2021

Márcio Alexandre Santos Machado (born 18 May 1998) is a Portuguese professional footballer who plays for São João Ver as a forward.

== Club career ==
On 18 March 2018, Márcio made his professional debut with Penafiel in a 2017–18 LigaPro match against Santa Clara.
