= Teath Kimheng =

Cambodian footballer

Teath Kimheng ទៀត គឹមហេង
Personal information
- Date of birth: May 1, 2000 (age 26)
- Place of birth: Sihanoukville, Cambodia
- Height: 1.73 m (5 ft 8 in)
- Position: Midfielder

Team information
- Current team: Life Sihanoukville
- Number: 10

Youth career
- 2015–2018: Bati Youth Football Academy

Senior career*
Years	Team	Apps	(Gls)
2019–2024	Visakha		
2024	Ministry of Interior FA	0	(0)
2024–2025	Life Sihanoukville	26	(1)
2025–2026	Visakha	11	(0)
2026–	Life Sihanoukville	4	(0)

International career
2015–2016	Cambodia U16	13	(1)
2017	Cambodia U18	4	(1)
2018	Cambodia U20	3	(0)
2020	Cambodia U23	3	(0)
2019	Cambodia	1	(0)
- * Club domestic league appearances and goals as of 26 October 2026

Teath Kimheng (born 1 May 2000) is a Cambodian footballer who plays as a midfielder for Life Sihanoukville in the Cambodian Premier League.

== Career ==
Teath Kimheng made his senior appearance debut for Cambodian League side Visakha in 2019.

He made one appearance for the Cambodia national team in friendly game against Bangladesh on 9 March 2019.
