= Noun Borey =

Cambodian footballer

Noun Borey នូន បូរី
Personal information
- Full name: Noun Borey
- Date of birth: 5 August 1991 (age 35)
- Place of birth: Phnom Penh, Cambodia
- Height: 1.69 m (5 ft 7 in)
- Position: Striker

Senior career*
Years	Team	Apps	(Gls)
2011–2024	Ministry of Interior FA		

International career
2015–2017	Cambodia U-22	10	(1)
2014–2017	Cambodia	2	(0)

Managerial career
- 2025: Ministry of Interior FA (Assistant)
- * Club domestic league appearances and goals

Noun Borey (Khmer: នូន បូរី; born 5 August 1991) is a former Cambodian footballer who last played for the Ministry of Interior FA in the Cambodian Premier League and the Cambodia national football team. He made his international debut in a friendly match against Singapore on 17 November 2014.
