= Hoy Phallin =

Cambodian footballer

Hoy Phallin ហ៊ុយ ផល្លីន
Personal information
- Full name: Hoy Phallin
- Date of birth: 30 March 1996 (age 30)
- Place of birth: Phnom Penh, Cambodia
- Height: 1.75 m (5 ft 9 in)
- Position: Midfielder

Youth career
- Preah Khan Reach

Senior career*
Years	Team	Apps	(Gls)
2013–2024	Preah Khan Reach Svay Rieng		
2022	→ ISI Dangkor Senchey (loan)	5	(2)
2024–2025	Ministry of Interior FA	5	(0)

International career^{‡}
2011–2012	Cambodia U-16	9	(3)
2013	Cambodia U-19	9	(1)
2015–2017	Cambodia U-22	19	(0)
2013–2022	Cambodia	30	(0)
- * Club domestic league appearances and goals as of 22 March 2018 ‡ National team caps and goals as of 22 March 2018

Hoy Phallin (Khmer: ហ៊ុយ ផល្លីន born 30 March 1996) is a Cambodian footballer who plays as a midfielder.

== International career ==
He made his senior international debut at the age of 17 on 22 March 2013 in a 2014 AFC Challenge Cup qualification match against Turkmenistan.

== Honours ==
=== Club ===
Preah Khan Reach Svay Rieng

- Cambodian Premier League: 2013, 2019, 2023–24
- Hun Sen Cup: 2015, 2017, 2023-24
