= Daisuke Kobayashi (footballer) =

Japanese footballer (born 1992)

Personal information
- Date of birth: 23 October 1992 (age 34)
- Place of birth: Jōetsu, Japan
- Height: 1.72 m (5 ft 7 1/2 in)
- Position: Midfielder

Youth career
- 2008–2010: Niigata Kogyo High School

College career
Years	Team	Apps	(Gls)
2011–2014	Hokuriku University		

Senior career*
Years	Team	Apps	(Gls)
2015–2016	Artista Asama		
2016–2017	Nakhon Phanom		
2017–2018	Surat Thani		
2018–2022	Svay Rieng	10	(1)
2022	Phnom Penh Crown	5	(0)
2022–2023	National Defense Ministry	8	(0)
2024	Loyola	6	(1)
2025	Kasuka	1	(0)
- * Club domestic league appearances and goals as of 1 November 2025

Daisuke Kobayashi (小林 大介, Kobayashi Daisuke; born 23 October 1992) is a Japanese professional footballer who plays as a midfielder.

== Youth career ==
Kobayashi was born in the city of Jōetsu in Niigata Prefecture. After graduating from Niigata High School, he played for the team of Hokuriku University.

== Club career ==
=== Japan and Thailand ===
After graduating from Hokuriku, Kobayashi joined Artista Asama in the Japanese regional leagues in 2015. After one year, he joined lower tier Thailand side Nakhon Phanom, marking his first professional contract. He would transfer to Surat Thani in the Thai League 3 the year after before departing in 2018.

=== Cambodia ===
In 2018, he would go to Cambodia to sign for league heavyweights Svay Rieng as their AFC player quota. His good performances led to his contract getting extended twice, until he departed the club in 2022, joining rivals Phnom Penh Crown before leaving the club shortly after.

=== Trialing for Persija Jakarta ===
Kobayashi would leave Cambodia and try out for the first team of Liga 1 side Persija Jakarta, playing two matches in the President's Cup in 2022. However, he didn't make the cut, and rejoined the Cambodian league later that year with National Defense Ministry.

=== Loyola ===
After leaving Tiffy Army, Kobayashi would go to Japan to pursue coaching. In 2024, he signed with Philippines Football League side Loyola as one of their foreign reinforcements for the 2024 season.

=== Kasuka ===
On 8 June 2025, Kobayashi was announced to have signed for two-time champions Kasuka FC of the Brunei Super League. He subsequently made his debut in the Shopee Cup against DH Cebu in a 2–1 win on 8 August.
