= Alexis Ramos =

Argentine footballer

Personal information
- Full name: Alexis Damián Ramos
- Date of birth: April 13, 1989 (age 37)
- Place of birth: San Carlos de Bolívar, Argentina
- Height: 1.94 m (6 ft 4 in)
- Position: Forward

Youth career
- –2011: Aldosivi

Senior career*
Years	Team	Apps	(Gls)
2011–2012	Aldosivi	0	(0)
2012–2013	Concepción	6	(1)
2013	Ferro de General Pico	12	(8)
2014	Gimnasia del Uruguay	7	(0)
2014	Estudiantes de Río Cuarto	3	(0)
2015	Independiente de Chivilcoy	4	(1)
2015	General Paz Juniors	16	(6)
2016	Huracán de Goya	8	(3)
2016	Técnico Universitario	4	(1)
2017	Isidro Metapán	15	(4)
2017	El Tanque Sisley	14	(5)
2018	Metropolitanos	4	(1)
2018	Gudja United	9	(4)
2019	Angkor Tiger	19	(12)
2020	Pérez Zeledon	7	(0)
2020	Diriangen	10	(6)
2021	Deportivo Sanarate	0	(0)
2021	Aurora	5	(0)
2022	Suchitepéquez	5	(0)
2022	Huracán Las Heras	10	(4)
2022–2023	FADEP	3	(2)
- * Club domestic league appearances and goals

Alexis Ramos (born 13 April 1989) is an Argentine footballer.

== Club career ==
Born in San Carlos de Bolívar, Ramos began playing football in the youth system of local side Aldosivi. He played with the club's senior side for one and one-half seasons before embarking on an extended spell in the Argentine regional leagues with Concepción Fútbol Club, Ferro Carril Oeste de General Pico, Gimnasia y Esgrima de Concepción del Uruguay, Estudiantes de Río Cuarto, Independiente de Chivilcoy, General Paz Juniors and Huracán de Goya.

After a spell playing for A.D. Isidro Metapán in El Salvador, Ramos played for El Tanque Sisley in the 2017 Uruguayan Primera División. After El Tanque Sisley withdrew from the 2018 league, he joined Venezuelan Primera División side Metropolitanos F.C.

Alexis Ramos made his debut in Cambodia League in 2019 For Angkor Tiger.
