= Lyuben Nikolov =

Bulgarian footballer

Personal information
- Full name: Lyuben Georgiev Nikolov
- Date of birth: 8 September 1985 (age 41)
- Place of birth: Sofia, Bulgaria
- Height: 6 ft 3 in (1.91 m)
- Position: Centre-back

Team information
- Current team: Tsarsko Selo (assistant)

Youth career
- 2002–2004: Levski Sofia

Senior career*
Years	Team	Apps	(Gls)
2004–2007	Levski Sofia	0	(0)
2004–2005	→ Vihren Sandanski (loan)	4	(1)
2005–2006	→ Rodopa Smolyan (loan)	10	(0)
2006–2007	→ Maritsa Plovdiv (loan)	18	(2)
2007–2009	Spartak Plovdiv	22	(1)
2009–2010	Nesebar	20	(2)
2010–2011	Akademik Sofia	13	(0)
2011–2012	Sportist Svoge	20	(3)
2013–2014	Dinamo Brest	53	(0)
2015–2016	Sisaket	44	(1)
2017	Super Power Samut Prakan	27	(1)
2018	PKNP FC	10	(0)
2019	Visakha	12	(2)
2019–2020	Dunav Ruse	23	(0)

Managerial career
- 2022–: Tsarsko Selo (assistant)
- * Club domestic league appearances and goals

Lyuben Nikolov (Bulgarian: Любен Николов; born 8 September 1985) is a Bulgarian former professional footballer who played as a centre-back.

== Career ==
=== Youth career in "Levski" Sofia and other Bulgarian clubs ===
Nikolov grew up as part of Levski Sofia's academy and signed his first professional contract with the senior team in the 2002–03 season. He signed a three-year contract, but did not make any official appearance for the first team. For that time he played on loan for Vihren Sandanski, Rodopa Smolian and Maritsa Plovdiv.

In Bulgaria he also played for Spartak Plovdiv, Nessebar FC, Akademik and Svoge.

=== Dynamo Brest ===
In 2013 Nikolov moved to Belarus, where he signed a one-year contract with FC Dynamo Brest. Because of his good performance, he was offered to renew his contract with the team for one more season. After two seasons in Belarus, Nikolov moved to Thailand.

=== Sisaket ===
In the beginning of January 2015, Sisaket FC announced that the club had signed Nikolov to a two-year deal (year two of the contract is a club option). Nikolov made 45 appearances and scored 1 goal during his first season in Thai premier league.

In this season Sisaket FC reached the final of the Toyota Cup, for the first time in the history of the club. They lost 1:0 to Buriram United and Nikolov was awarded a silver medal.

After this great season, Nikolov was chosen by Thaileague Mania in their "11 Top Transfers of 2015 in Thaileague":
