= Yeon Gi-sung =

South Korean footballer (born 1989)

Personal information
- Date of birth: August 1, 1989 (age 37)
- Place of birth: Suwon, South Korea
- Height: 1.86 m (6 ft 1 in)
- Position: Forward

Youth career
- Baekam High School

College career
Years	Team	Apps	(Gls)
- Honam University

Senior career*
Years	Team	Apps	(Gls)
2009	FC Seoul		
2010	Gyeongnam FC	5	
2011	TTM Phichit	26	(16)
2013	BEC Tero Sasana	7	(3)
2014	→ PTT Rayong (loan)	15	(5)
2015	Yadanarbon	18	(12)
2016	Bangkok Christian College	15	(11)
2017	Phnom Penh Crown	16	(13)
2018	PKNP	10	(4)
2019	Preah Khan Reach Svay Rieng	18	(10)
2020–2021	Chamchuri United	17	(12)
2021	Ranong United	16	(7)
2021–2022	Rajpracha	14	(2)
2022	Rayong	12	(2)
2023	Phrae United	5	(4)
- * Club domestic league appearances and goals as of 1 December 2023

Yeon Gi-sung (born 1 August 1989) is a South Korean footballer who plays as a forward.

== Club career ==
On account of limited game time at Gyeongnam, the attacker went to Thailand to play for Thai Premier League team TTM Phichit in 2011, authoring a hat-trick right away and recording seven goals in total. However, he suffered a dislocated foot, requiring two surgeries, and was benched for 20 months before a four-month stint with BEC Tero Sasana in 2014, leading to a loan spell with PTT Rayong which was cut short by a torn ligament.

As one of the many repercussions of an injury, Yeon had to recover for about a year, finally transferring to Myanmar National League side Yadanarbon F.C. in 2015, helping the club to a runners-up medal. Going back to Thailand to play for Bangkok Christian College for the remainder of the season where he scored 7 times, the Korean officially became the property of Cambodian outfit Phnom Penh Crown FC in May 2017. Appearing in a number of games, Yeon placated the fans with 7 goals in an 11-0 crushing of CMAC FC. Comfortable with life in Cambodia's capital, the forward shares residency with four Korean footballers and two agents, going to Phnom Penh SunLin Church as a Christian.
