= Ángel Carrascosa =

Spanish footballer (born 1990)

Personal information
- Full name: Ángel Carrascosa Muñoz
- Date of birth: 1 April 1990 (age 36)
- Place of birth: Tomelloso, Spain
- Height: 1.81 m (5 ft 11 in)
- Position: Striker

Team information
- Current team: C.D. Honduras

Senior career*
Years	Team	Apps	(Gls)
2009–2010	CD Toledo B		
2010–2011	Manzanares CF		
2011–2012	CD Puertollano		
2012–2013	Naft Maysan SC		
2014	Stallion Laguna FC		
2015	Al-Orouba SC		
2015–2017	Club Valencia		
2018	Victory Sports Club		
2019	Boeung Ket Angkor FC		
2021–2022	Club Green Streets		
2022–	CD Honduras Progreso		
- * Club domestic league appearances and goals

Ángel Carrascosa Muñoz (born 1 April 1990) is a Spanish footballer who plays as a striker for CD Honduras Progreso.

== Career ==
He started his career with Spanish side CD Toledo B. In 2010, he signed for Spanish side Manzanares CF. In 2011, he signed for Spanish side CD Puertollano. On 23 October 2011, he debuted for the club during a 1–0 win over CP Cacereño. On 2 December 2011, he scored his first goal for the club during a 3–2 win over CD Badajoz. In 2012, he signed for Iraqi side Naft Maysan SC. In 2014, he signed for Filipino side Stallion Laguna FC. In 2015, he signed for Omani side Al-Orouba SC. After that, he signed for Maldivian side Club Valencia. In 2018, he signed for Maldivian side Victory Sports Club. In 2019, he signed for Cambodian side Boeung Ket Angkor FC. In 2021, he signed for Maldivian side Club Green Streets. In 2022, he signed for Honduran side CD Honduras Progreso. He was described as "showed flashes of good football with the '10' on the back" but suffered a ligament injury while playing for the club.

== Style of play ==
He mainly operates as a striker. He is left-footed. He is known for his mobility.

== Personal life ==
He is a native of Tomelloso, Spain.
