= Kenjiro Ogino =

Japanese footballer

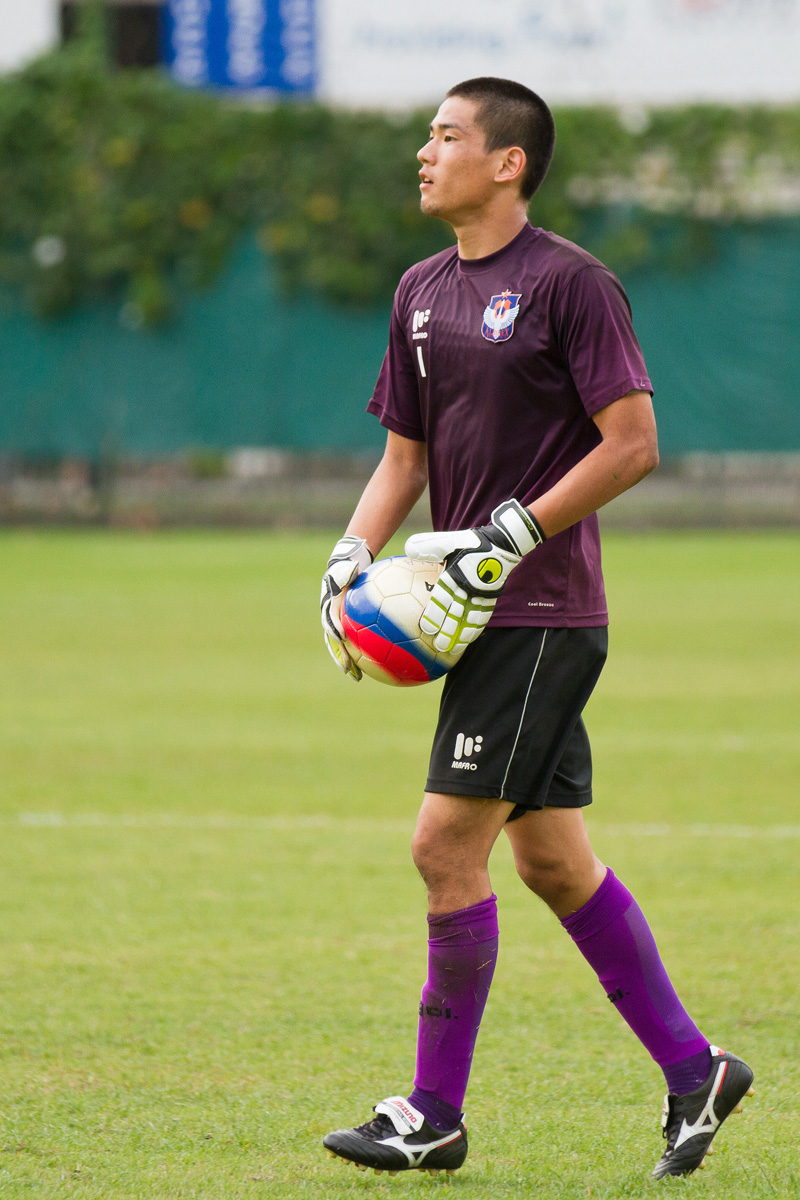

Personal information
- Full name: Kenjiro Ogino
- Date of birth: September 14, 1991 (age 35)
- Place of birth: Yosano, Kyoto, Japan
- Height: 1.87 m (6 ft 1 1/2 in)
- Position: Goalkeeper

Senior career*
Years	Team	Apps	(Gls)
2010–2012	Cerezo Osaka	0	(0)
2013–2015	Albirex Niigata Singapore	15	(0)
2016–2017	MIO Biwako Shiga		
2017	Asia Euro United	14	(0)
2017	Soltilo Angkor	0	(0)
2018	Angkor Tiger	9	(0)
2019-2022	FC Tokushima	6	(0)
- * Club domestic league appearances and goals as of December 31, 2015

Kenjiro Ogino (荻野 賢次郎, Ogino Kenjiro; born September 14, 1991) is a Japanese former football player who played as a goalkeeper.

== Career ==
He was educated at and played for Yosano Municipal Koyo Junior High School and Mineyama High School. He was selected as part of the squad to represent Japan U-18 in the AFC U-19 Championship.

After graduating from the high school in 2010, he joined the recent promoted J1 League side Cerezo Osaka. During his 3-year stay, he failed to make an appearance for the club. Hence he signed for Albirex Niigata Singapore from the S.League in 2013.
