= Anderson Zogbe =

Ivorian footballer

Personal information
- Full name: Anderson Gbayoro Zogbe
- Date of birth: 16 December 1995 (age 30)
- Place of birth: Kodiakro, Ivory Coast
- Height: 1.85 m (6 ft 1 in)
- Position: Centre-back

Team information
- Current team: Phnom Penh Crown
- Number: 40

Youth career
- Bangkok Glass

Senior career*
Years	Team	Apps	(Gls)
2013–2015	Nagaworld		
2015–2016	Build Bright United		
2016–2020	Nagaworld		
2020–2023	Boeung Ket		
2022	→ Nagaworld (loan)	10	(1)
2023–2024	Prey Veng	16	(1)
2024–2026	Visakha	0	(0)
2025	→ Police Tero (loan)	13	(2)
2025–2026	→ Nagaworld (loan)	26	(1)
2026–	Phnom Penh Crown	2	(0)
- * Club domestic league appearances and goals as of 9 November 2026

Anderson Gbayoro Zogbe (born 16 December 1995) is an Ivorian professional footballer who plays as a centre-back for Cambodian Premier League club Phnom Penh Crown.

== Club career ==
Zogbe started his professional football career in Cambodia in 2013 joining Nagaworld despite born in Ivory Coast.

Zogbe signed for Phnom Penh Crown on 7 July 2026 make him eligible to compete in higher football level especially in 2026–27 AFC Champions League Two.

== Personal life ==
Zogbe is a naturalized Cambodian citizen made him eligible to represent Cambodia internationally.

== Honours ==
Nagaworld

- Cambodian League: 2018

Boeung Ket

- Cambodian League:2020
