= Shane Booysen =

South African former soccer player

Personal information
- Full name: Shane Booysen
- Date of birth: 23 November 1988 (age 37)
- Place of birth: Cape Town, South Africa
- Height: 1.68 m (5 ft 6 in)
- Position: Forward

Youth career
- 1998–2002: Ajax Cape Town
- 2002–2005: Hellenic
- 2005–2007: Mamelodi Sundowns

Senior career*
Years	Team	Apps	(Gls)
2007	Gleneden United		
2007–2014	Ajax Cape Town		
–	→ Ikapa Sporting (loan)		
2014	Rbac Mittraphap		
2014–2015	Bangkok Christian College		
2015–2017	Phnom Penh Crown	41	(41)
2018	Preah Khan Reach Svay Rieng	10	(7)
2019	National Police Commissary	10	(10)
2019	Phnom Penh Crown	12	(8)
2020	Nagaworld	14	(5)
2021	National Police Commissary	2	(2)
- * Club domestic league appearances and goals

Shane Booysen (born 23 November 1988) is a South African former soccer player who plays for Phnom Penh Crown in Cambodian League.
