= Dudu (footballer, born 1988) =

Brazilian footballer

Personal information
- Full name: Luiz Eduardo Purcino
- Date of birth: December 29, 1988 (age 37)
- Place of birth: Brazil
- Height: 1.75 m (5 ft 9 in)
- Positions: Forward; winger

Youth career
- 2005–2009: A. A. Caldense
- 2007: Venda Nova

Senior career*
Years	Team	Apps	(Gls)
2006–2009	A. A. Caldense		
2010–2011	Buriram PEA	21	(10)
2011	Sriracha	9	(4)
2012	Osotspa Saraburi	22	(12)
2013	Phuket	20	(7)
2014	Police United	12	(3)
2015–2016	Phan Thong	10	(7)
2017	Sahab	0	(0)
2017	MISC-MIFA	8	(4)
2019	Boeung Ket		
- * Club domestic league appearances and goals

Luiz Eduardo Purcino (born 29 December 1988), known as Dudu, is a Brazilian professional football player who plays as a forward and also can play as a winger.

Dudu scored 10 goals for Buriram PEA in the 2010 Thai Premier League season. Runner up and foreigner top score of the club. He was released from Buriram PEA in January 2011.
