= Evangelos Skraparas =

German footballer

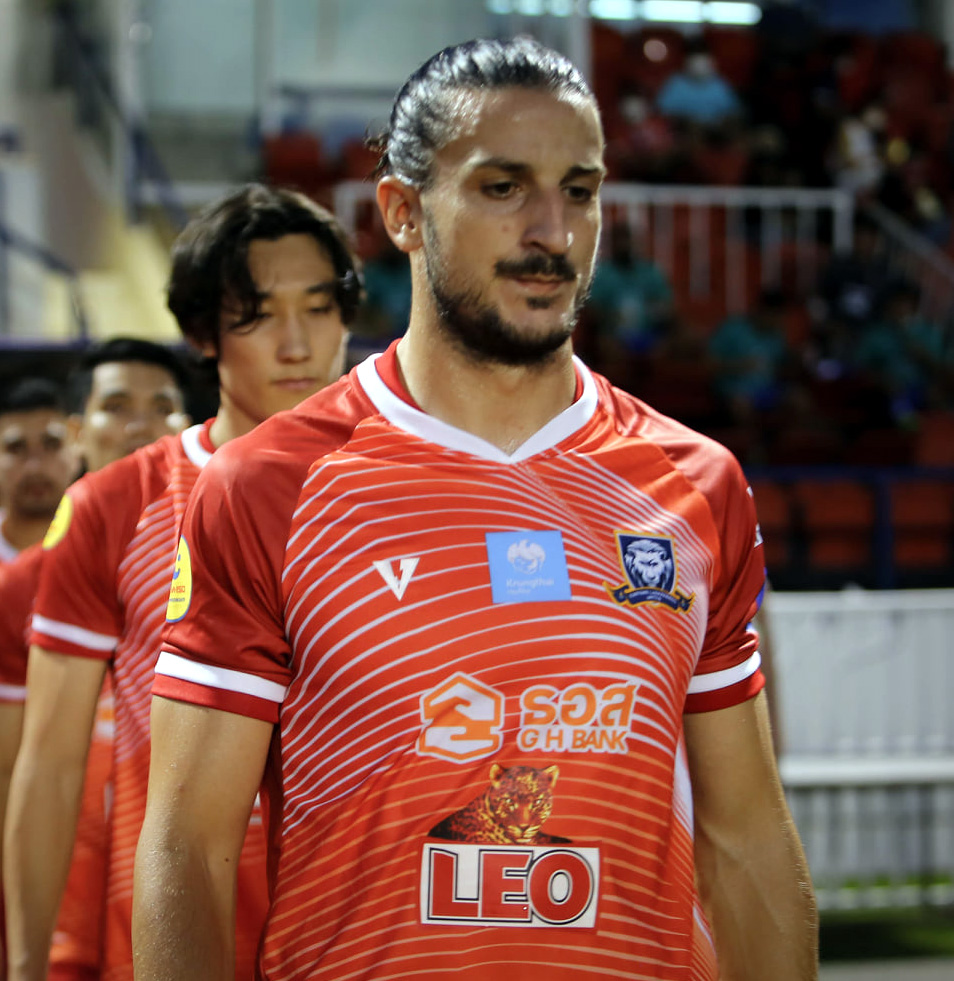
- Skraparas with Customs Ladkrabang United

Personal information
- Date of birth: 5 March 1991 (age 35)
- Place of birth: Remscheid, Germany
- Positions: Winger; forward

Senior career*
Years	Team	Apps	(Gls)
–2010	Wuppertaler SV	0	(0)
2010–2011	VfB Hüls	9	(0)
2011–2012	SC Westfalia Herne	21	(2)
2012–2013	FC Kray	1	(0)
2013–2014	TuS Ennepetal	30	(6)
2014–2015	Malchower SV	28	(8)
2015–2016	Sportul Snagov	8	(2)
2015–2016	AO Chania	2	(0)
2016–2017	Sportul Snagov	10	(4)
2016–2017	Aiginiakos	13	(0)
2018	Richmond SC	7	(9)
2018–2019	Sportul Snagov	2	(0)
2019	Visakha FC	16	(9)
2020–2021	Bonner SC	4	(0)
2020–2021	FC Wegberg-Beeck	22	(2)
2021	Customs Ladkrabang United	16	(1)
2022	Udon Thani	17	(2)
2022–2023	UE Santa Coloma	2	(0)
- * Club domestic league appearances and goals as of 01:38, 4 July 2024 (UTC)

Evangelos Skraparas (Greek: Βαγγέλης Σκραπάρας; born 5 March 1991) is a German professional footballer who plays as a winger or forward.

== Career ==
In 2013, Skraparas signed for TuS Ennepetal. In 2016, Skraparas signed for Sportul Snagov. After that, he signed for Aiginiakos. În 2018, he trialed for Quang Nam. In 2019, he signed for Visakha FC. In 2020, he signed for Bonner SC. In 2021, he signed for Customs Ladkrabang United. In 2022, he signed for Udon Thani.
