= Prak Chanratana =

Cambodian footballer

Prak Chanratana ប្រាក់ ចាន់រតនា
Personal information
- Full name: Prak Chanratana
- Date of birth: October 16, 1993 (age 33)
- Place of birth: Kampot, Cambodia
- Position: Forward

Senior career*
Years	Team	Apps	(Gls)
2012–2017	Nagaworld		
2018–2020	Soltilo Angkor		
2021	Kirivong Sok Sen Chey	18	(2)

International career
2015	Cambodia U-22	2	(0)
2015	Cambodia	3	(0)
- * Club domestic league appearances and goals

Prak Chanratana (born 16 October 1993) is a former Cambodian footballer who last played for the Kirivong Sok Sen Chey in the Cambodian League and the Cambodia national football team.
