= Ean Pisey =

Cambodian footballer

Personal information
- Full name: Ean Pisey
- Date of birth: 11 March 2002 (age 24)
- Place of birth: Kandal, Cambodia
- Height: 1.64 m (5 ft 5 in)
- Position: Winger

Team information
- Current team: Nagaworld
- Number: 10

Youth career
- Kirivong Sok Sen Chey
- Bati Academy

Senior career*
Years	Team	Apps	(Gls)
2021–2024	Preah Khan Reach Svay Rieng	47	(2)
2023–2024	→ Kirivong Sok Sen Chey (loan)	20	(2)
2025–	Nagaworld	17	(0)

International career
2019	Cambodia U19		
2021–2023	Cambodia U23		
2021–2022	Cambodia	3	(0)
- * Club domestic league appearances and goals as of 9 November 2026

Ean Pisey (born 11 March 2002) is a Cambodian professional footballer who plays as a winger for Cambodian Premier League club Nagaworld and the Cambodia national team.
