= Sin Kakada =

Cambodian footballer

Sin Kakada ស៊ិន កក្កដា
Personal information
- Full name: Sin Kakada
- Date of birth: July 29, 2000 (age 26)
- Place of birth: Phnom Penh, Cambodia
- Height: 1.70 m (5 ft 7 in)
- Position: Attacking midfielder

Team information
- Current team: Visakha
- Number: 11

Youth career
- 2013–2017: Phnom Penh Crown

Senior career*
Years	Team	Apps	(Gls)
2017–2018	Phnom Penh Crown		
2019–	Visakha	95	(15)

International career^{‡}
2019–2022	Cambodia U23	6	(2)
2018–	Cambodia	15	(1)
Medal record
Men's football
Representing Cambodia
FIFA ASEAN Challenge Cup
Runner-up	2026 Hong Kong
- * Club domestic league appearances and goals ‡ National team caps and goals as of 5 October 2026

Sin Kakada (born 29 July 2000) is a Cambodian professional footballer who plays as an attacking midfielder for Cambodian Premier League club Visakha and the Cambodia national team.

== Club career ==
Kakada made his senior debut in Cambodia League in 2018 For Phnom Penh Crown.

== International career ==
Kakada made his senior debut in a friendly match against Laos on 21 March 2018.

On 27 September 2026, he scored his first international goal during the 2026 FIFA ASEAN Cup scoring the winning goal in the 90+4' stoppage time against Myanmar

== International goals ==
No.	Date	Venue	Opponent	Score	Result	Competition
1.	27 September 2026	Kai Tak Stadium, Kowloon, Hong Kong	Myanmar	1–0	1–0	2026 FIFA ASEAN Cup
