= Marcio Santos (footballer, born 1987) =

Brazilian footballer

Personal information
- Full name: Marcio Gleydson da Silva Santos
- Date of birth: 22 February 1987 (age 39)
- Place of birth: São Paulo, Brazil
- Height: 1.81 m (5 ft 11 in)
- Position: Midfielder

Team information
- Current team: Ultimate
- Number: 8

Youth career
- Comercial F. C.
- Botafogo de Futebol e Regatas

Senior career*
Years	Team	Apps	(Gls)
2005–2006	Olimpia F.C.	0	(0)
2006–2007	Jaboticabal Atlético	18	(0)
2009–2010	Raj Pracha Thailand F.C.	26	(7)
2010–2012	Okktha United F.C.	24	(4)
2012	Phuket F.C.	22	(6)
2013	Rayong United F.C.	15	(0)
2014	Udon Thani F.C.	11	(0)
2015	Rakhine United F.C.	14	(7)
2016	Savan United		
2017	Chennai City F.C.	2	(0)
2018	Luang Prabang United		
2019	Kirivong Sok Sen Chey		
2020–	Ultimate		
- * Club domestic league appearances and goals

Marcio Gleydson da Silva Santos, known as Marcio Santos (born Feb 22, 1987 in Brazil) is a Brazilian football player, who currently plays for Ultimate F.C. in the Malaysia M3 League. He usually plays as a midfielder. Despite playing on one of the bottom-ranking teams in Thailand, Myanmar and Laos, he has proven to be a moderate success and has scored and assisted in his recent appearances as a starter.
