= Soeuy Visal =

Cambodian footballer (born 1995)

Personal information
- Full name: Soeuy Visal
- Date of birth: 19 August 1995 (age 31)
- Place of birth: Phnom Penh, Cambodia
- Height: 1.73 m (5 ft 8 in)
- Positions: Centre back; defensive midfielder

Team information
- Current team: Preah Khan Reach Svay Rieng
- Number: 5

Youth career
- 2013: Preah Khan Reach

Senior career*
| Years | Team | Apps | (Gls) |
| 2013–2014 | Asia Europe University | | |
| 2014– | Preah Khan Reach Svay Rieng | | |

International career^{‡}
| 2015–2017 | Cambodia U22 | 15 | (1) |
| 2015 | Cambodia U23 | 4 | (0) |
| 2014– | Cambodia | 85 | (5) |
- * Club domestic league appearances and goals ‡ National team caps and goals as of 25 March 2025

Soeuy Visal (Khmer: សឿយ វិសាល, Sœăy Vĭsal [sɨəj ʋisaːl]; born 19 August 1995) is a Cambodian professional footballer who plays as a centre back or a defensive midfielder for Preah Khan Reach Svay Rieng and the Cambodia national team.

== International career ==
=== International goals ===
Scores and results list Cambodia's goal tally first.

| # | Date | Venue | Opponent | Score | Result | Competition |
|---|---|---|---|---|---|---|
| 1. | 3 November 2015 | Phnom Penh National Olympic Stadium, Phnom Penh, Cambodia | Brunei | 6–1 | 6–1 | Friendly |
| 2. | 9 October 2016 | Phnom Penh National Olympic Stadium, Phnom Penh, Cambodia | Sri Lanka | 1–0 | 4–0 | Friendly |
| 3. | 10 September 2018 | Phnom Penh National Olympic Stadium, Phnom Penh, Cambodia | Malaysia | 1–0 | 1–3 | Friendly |
| 4. | 7 June 2021 | Al Muharraq Stadium, Arad, Bahrain | Iraq | 1–3 | 1–4 | 2022 FIFA World Cup qualification |
| 5. | 11 September 2023 | Phnom Penh National Olympic Stadium, Phnom Penh, Cambodia | Macau | 3–0 | 4–0 | Friendly |

== Honours ==
Preah Khan Reach Svay Rieng

- Cambodian Premier League: 2023–24
- Hun Sen Cup: 2023–24
- AFC Challenge League runner-up: 2024–25
