= Ly Mizan =

Cambodian footballer

Personal information
- Full name: Ly Mizan
- Date of birth: 16 August 1993 (age 33)
- Place of birth: Kampong Cham, Cambodia
- Height: 1.70 m (5 ft 7 in)
- Position: Midfielder

Senior career*
Years	Team	Apps	(Gls)
2012–2023	Boeung Ket		
2023–2024	ISI Dangkor Senchey	13	(1)

International career^{‡}
2017	Cambodia	1	(0)
- * Club domestic league appearances and goals ‡ National team caps and goals as of 9 February 2017

Ly Mizan (Khmer: លី មីហ្សាន born 16 August 1993) is a Cambodian footballer.

== International career ==
He made his debut in a friendly match against Saudi Arabia national football team on 14 January 2017
