= Ouk Sothy =

Cambodian footballer

Ouk Sothy អ៊ុក សុធី
Personal information
- Full name: Ouk Sothy
- Date of birth: October 5, 1987 (age 39)
- Place of birth: Phnom Penh, Cambodia
- Height: 1.70 m (5 ft 7 in)
- Position: Midfielder

Senior career*
Years	Team	Apps	(Gls)
2011–2019	Phnom Penh Crown		

International career^{‡}
2014–2017	Cambodia	4	(0)

Managerial career
- 2021–2022: Soltilo Angkor
- 2021–2024: Cambodia (assistant)
- * Club domestic league appearances and goals ‡ National team caps and goals as of March 17, 2015

Ouk Sothy (born 5 October 1987) is a Cambodian football coach and former football player. who last played as a midfielder for Phnom Penh Crown and the Cambodia national football team. His nickname is Messi which is given by his teammates. He is currently work as head coach of Soltilo Angkor in the Cambodian League and assistant coach of Cambodia national football team.

== Honors ==
=== Club ===
Phnom Penh Crown

- Cambodian League: 2014, 2015
