= Sos Suhana =

Cambodian footballer (born 1992)

Personal information
- Full name: Sos Suhana
- Date of birth: 4 April 1992 (age 34)
- Place of birth: Phnom Penh, Cambodia
- Height: 1.68 m (5 ft 6 in)
- Position: Midfielder

Team information
- Current team: Nagaworld
- Number: 12

Youth career
- Prek Pra Keila

Senior career*
Years	Team	Apps	(Gls)
2010–2011	Prek Pra Keila		
2011–2016	Phnom Penh Crown		
2016–	Nagaworld		

International career^{‡}
2012	Cambodia U22	6	(2)
2011–2015	Cambodia U23	13	(1)
2012–	Cambodia	81	(4)
- * Club domestic league appearances and goals ‡ National team caps and goals as of 19 August 2026

Sos Suhana (Khmer: សុះ ស៊ូហាណា, Sŏh Suhana [soh suːhaːnaː]; born 4 April 1992) is a Cambodian professional footballer who plays as a midfielder for Cambodian Premier League club Nagaworld.

== Personal life ==
Born in Phnom Penh, Suhana is a Cambodian Muslim.

== Club career ==
=== Phnom Penh Crown ===
After the relegation of Prek Pra Keila in 2011, Suhana has signed for Phnom Penh Crown. In 2012, he was in the squad in play in 2012 AFC President's Cup. He helped his club to win Cambodian League in the 2014 season and helped his club to be the third place in 2014 Mekong Club Championship too.

=== Nagaworld ===
In 2016, Suhana signed a contract with Nagaworld after spending 5 years with Phnom Penh Crown.

== International career ==
After impressed national team's coach while he was playing for Prek Pra Keila, Suhana was called up for his national team to play against Laos in 2014 FIFA World Cup qualification – AFC first round. He made his international debut in a Friendly Match against Philippines on 5 September 2012, which ended in a scoreless draw. However, it was not a FIFA full 'A' international friendly since the Cambodian side used seven substitutes instead of six. He scored his first international goal in 2018 FIFA World Cup qualification – AFC second round against Singapore in the 65th minute. On 23 November 2016, he scored a goal against Myanmar during 2016 AFF Championship.

== International goals ==
#	Date	Venue	Opponent	Score	Result	Competition
1.	13 October 2015	National Stadium, Kallang, Singapore	Singapore	1–2	1–2	2018 FIFA World Cup qualification
2.	23 November 2016	Thuwunna Stadium, Yangon, Myanmar	Myanmar	1–0	1–3	2016 AFF Championship
3.	12 October 2021	Khalifa Sports City Stadium, Isa Town, Bahrain	Guam	1–1	2–1	2023 AFC Asian Cup qualification
4.	10 September 2024	Olympic Stadium, Phnom Penh, Cambodia	Sri Lanka	2–1	2–2 (a.e.t.); 2–4 (p)	2027 AFC Asian Cup qualification

== Honours ==
Phnom Penh Crown

- Cambodian League: 2014
