= RSN Stadium =

Football stadium in Phnom Penh, Cambodia

Phnom Penh Crown Stadium
- Interactive map of Phnom Penh Crown Stadium
- Full name: Phnom Penh Crown Stadium
- Location: Phnom Penh, Cambodia
- Coordinates: 11.60469°N 104.89427°E
- Owner: Rithy Samnang
- Operator: Phnom Penh Crown
- Capacity: 5,000
- Field size: 105 x 68 m

Construction
- Groundbreaking: 2014
- Opened: 2015

Tenant
- Phnom Penh Crown (2015–present)

RSN Stadium, currently known as the Smart RSN Stadium for sponsorship reasons, is a football stadium in Phnom Penh, Cambodia, and the home of Cambodian Premier League club Phnom Penh Crown. The all-seater Smart RSN Stadium is named after the club late owner, Rithy Samnang. The stadium was opened with the RSN Youth Cup in June 2015 with a 4-team international tournament including Malaysia's Frenz United and Chonburi and Muangthong United from Thailand. All proceeds from the tournament were given to the Kantha Bopha Children's Hospital. The stadium hosted 2023 SEA Games Women's football events.

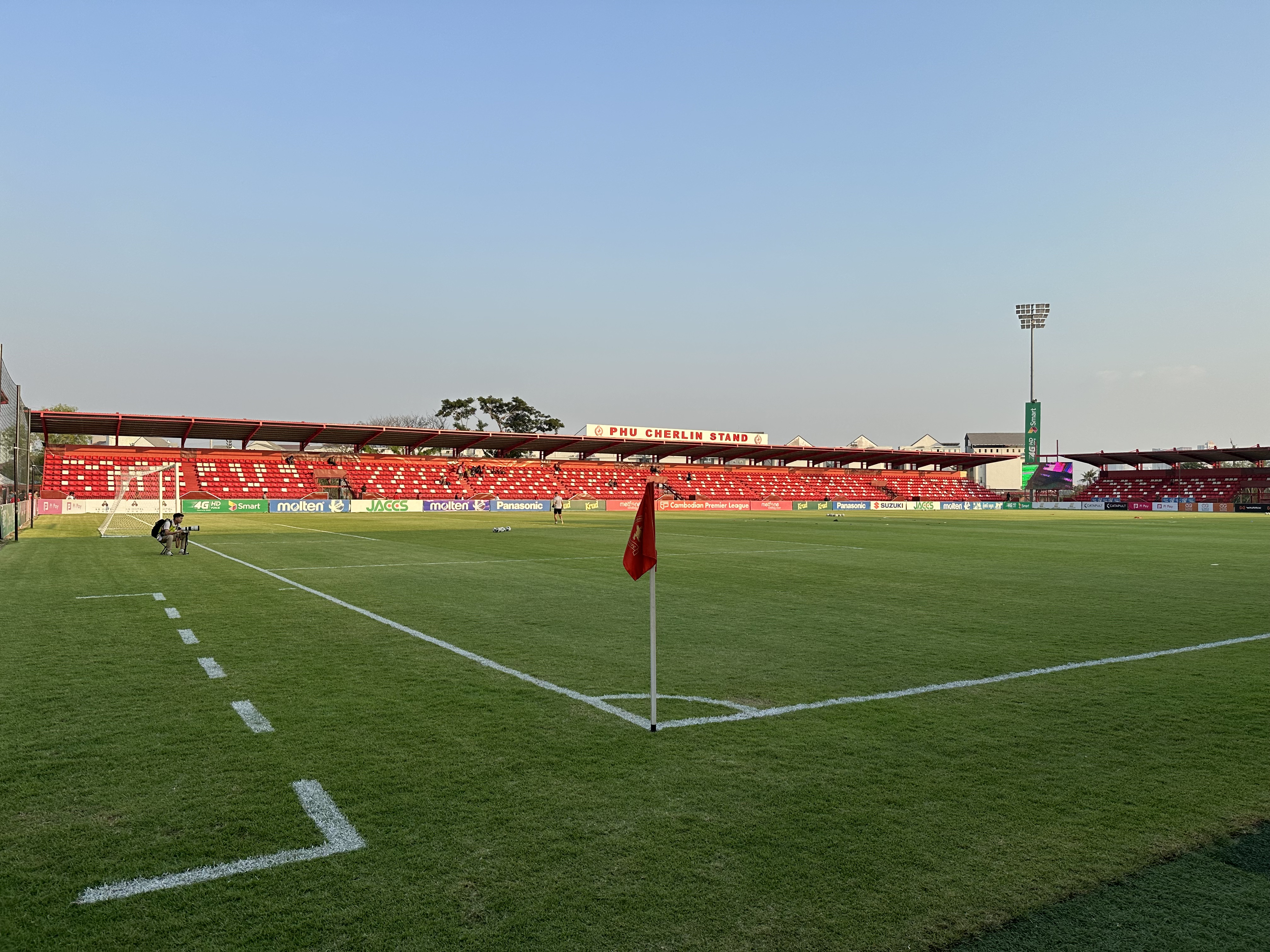
RSN Stadium view from corner
