= In Sodavid =

Cambodian footballer

Personal information
- Full name: In Sodavid
- Date of birth: 2 July 1998 (age 28)
- Place of birth: Phnom Penh, Cambodia
- Height: 1.65 m (5 ft 5 in)
- Position: Midfielder

Team information
- Current team: Visakha
- Number: 23

Youth career
- 2011–2015: Phnom Penh Crown

Senior career*
Years	Team	Apps	(Gls)
2015–2018	Phnom Penh Crown	50	(9)
2019–	Visakha		

International career^{‡}
2016	Cambodia U19	4	(1)
2017	Cambodia U22	6	(0)
2019	Cambodia U23	4	(0)
2016–	Cambodia	18	(0)
- * Club domestic league appearances and goals ‡ National team caps and goals as of 6 June 2025

In Sodavid (Khmer: អុិន សូដាវីដ [ʔin soːɗaːʋit]; born 2 July 1998) is a Cambodian professional footballer who plays for Cambodian Premier League club Visakha and the Cambodia national football team.

== Club career ==
Sodavid signed his first professional contract with Phnom Penh Crown in 2015 and made his first appearance on 26 September. During his first professional season, he made 6 appearances with 2 goals and helped his club to win sixth title.

== International career ==
He made his international debut in a Friendly Match against Sri Lanka on 9 October 2016.

== Honours ==
=== Club ===
Phnom Penh Crown

- Cambodian League: 2015

Visakha

- Hun Sen Cup: 2020, 2021, 2022
