= Sary Matnorotin =

Cambodian footballer

Sary Matnorotin សារី ម៉ាត់រ៉ូទីន
Personal information
- Full name: Sary Matnorotin
- Date of birth: 5 October 1996 (age 30)
- Place of birth: Phnom Penh, Cambodia
- Height: 1.73 m (5 ft 8 in)
- Position: Striker

Senior career*
Years	Team	Apps	(Gls)
2013–2015	Asia Europe University		
2015–2016	Phnom Penh Crown		
2016–2018	Nagaworld		
2018–2020	Visakha		
2020–2022	Nagaworld		
2023	Koh Kong		
2023–2024	Angkor Tiger	23	(1)

International career
2015	Cambodia U22	7	(1)
2015	Cambodia	1	(0)
- * Club domestic league appearances and goals

Sary Matnorotin (born 5 October 1996 in Cambodia) is a Cambodian footballer who plays as a striker.

== International career ==
=== Cambodia U22 ===
He scored his first U-22 goal in 2016 AFC U-23 Championship qualification against North Korea U22 on 29 March 2015, despite losing 4–1.

=== Cambodia ===
Sary Matnorotin made his international debut in a friendly match against Bhutan on 20 August 2015.
