= Sareth Krya =

Cambodian footballer (born 1996)

Sareth Krya សារ៉េត គ្រីយ៉ា
Personal information
- Full name: Sareth Krya
- Date of birth: 3 March 1996 (age 30)
- Place of birth: Kandal, Cambodia
- Height: 1.75 m (5 ft 9 in)
- Positions: Right back; centre back

Team information
- Current team: Preah Khan Reach Svay Rieng
- Number: 13

Youth career
- 2013: Preah Khan Reach Svay Rieng

Senior career*
Years	Team	Apps	(Gls)
2014–	Preah Khan Reach Svay Rieng	126	(13)

International career^{‡}
- Cambodia U22
- Cambodia U23
2017–	Cambodia	43	(2)
- * Club domestic league appearances and goals ‡ National team caps and goals as of 5 October 2026

Sareth Krya (born 3 March 1996) is a Cambodian professional footballer who plays as a right back or a centre back for Cambodian Premier League club Preah Khan Reach Svay Rieng and the Cambodian national football team.

== Club career ==
Krya has spent most of his professional career at Preah Khan Reach Svay Rieng where he notably scored a goal in the 2025 AFC Challenge League final against Turkmenistan club Arkadag but lost 2–1 to the opponents.

== Personal life ==
Born in Kandal, Krya is a Cambodian Muslim.

== Career statistics ==
=== International goals ===
Scores and results list Cambodia's goal tally first.

#	Date	Venue	Opponent	Score	Result	Competition
1.	23 December 2022	Gelora Bung Karno Stadium, Jakarta, Indonesia	Indonesia	1–1	1–2	2022 AFF Championship
2.	13 November 2025	Hong Kong Stadium, So Kon Po, Hong Kong	Hong Kong	1–1	1–1	Friendly
