= MOI Kompong Dewa FC =

Cambodian football club

MOI Kompong Dewa អឹម អូ អាយ កំពង់ដេវ៉ា អេហ្វសុី
- Full name: MOI Kompong Dewa Football Club
- Nickname: The Police
- Founded: 1994; 32 years ago, as National Police; 24 June 2025; 15 months ago, as MOI Kompong Dewa FC
- Ground: Prince Stadium
- Capacity: 15,000
- President: Kevin Hardiman
- Head coach: Alex Dorado
- League: Cambodian Premier League
- 2025–26: Cambodian Premier League, 6th of 11
- Website: kompongdewafc.com
Home colours	Away colours

MOI Kompong Dewa Football Club (Khmer: អឹម អូ អាយ កំពង់ដេវ៉ា អេហ្វស៊ី) is a professional Cambodian football club based in Sihanoukville, Preah Sihanouk province. Historically known as the National Police (នគរបាលជាតិ), the club changed its name to the Ministry of Interior FA (សមាគមកីឡាបាល់ទាត់ក្រសួងមហាផ្ទៃ) in 2024, under the management of Cambodia's Ministry of Interior. They were renamed again in 2025, to MOI Kompong Dewa. They won their first and only Cambodian League in 2000, as well as one Hun Sen Cup in 2014.

== Players ==
As of 8 September 2026

Note: Flags indicate national team as defined under FIFA eligibility rules; some limited exceptions apply. Players may hold more than one non-FIFA nationality.

No.	Pos.	Nation	Player
1	GK	CAM	Kim Chanveasna
2	DF	CAM	In Khindaro
4	DF	CAM	Loem Vatana
6	DF	CAM	Chan Sanith
7	FW	CAM	Keo Oudom
8	MF	JPN	Takara Masutani
9	FW	CAM	Sitha Mathew
10	MF	CAM	San Kimheng
12	MF	CAM	Sri Piseth
13	GK	CAM	Saveng Samnang
14	DF	CAM	Sonn Thavisiv
15	MF	CAM	Phoa Theara
16	DF	CAM	Ny Sokry
17	MF	CAM	Khorn Narong
18	MF	CAM	San Sovathe
19	DF	CAM	Soun Savdy
20	MF	CAM	Alisher Mirzaev (on loan from Visakha)

No.	Pos.	Nation	Player
22	FW	KOR	Kim Hyeon-su
23	FW	CAM	San Bora
27	FW	CAM	Mon Rado
28	GK	BRA	Dida (captain)
39	DF	CAM	Phach Socheavila (on loan from Phnom Penh Crown)
41	DF	CAM	Sdaeng Phanhasopheaktra
44	DF	BRA	Pedro Henrique
47	FW	CAM	Soeun Solido
54	MF	CAM	Mon Vanda
65	DF	CAM	Vong Visal
66	MF	CAM	Dy Pharunn
88	DF	CAM	Lo Rasi
94	DF	BRA	Maurício Barbosa
96	DF	BRA	Charleston Silva
97	FW	CAM	Thol Rithy
—	GK	CAM	Mat Farib

=== Players with multiple nationalities ===
- (Uzbekistan) (Cambodia) Alisher Mirzaev
- (United States) (Cambodia) Sitha Mathew

== Club staff ==
Position	Staff
Team manager	(Cambodia) Sareth Sidon
Head coach	(Spain) Alex Dorado
Assistant coach	(Nigeria) Samuel Oseika
Assistant coach	(Cambodia) Chin Vannak
Assistant coach	(Cambodia) Tang Sopheak
Goalkeeper coach	(Brazil) Mauro Machado
Fitness coach	(Spain) Lopes Forner Marco
Match analyst	(Cambodia) Kun Sakrovy
Physiotherapist	(Cambodia) Khat Chanhak
Physiotherapist	(Spain) Villa Toledano Alejandro

== Achievements ==
- Cambodian League
  - Champions (1): 2000
- Hun Sen Cup
  - Champions (1): 2014
