= 2009 Albirex Niigata season =

Albirex Niigata
2009 season
- Chairman: Mitsugu Tamura
- Manager: Jun Suzuki
- Stadium: Big Swan
- J. League 1: 8th
- Emperor's Cup: Quarterfinals
- J. League Cup: Group stage
- Top goalscorer: League: (Brazil) Pedro Júnior (10) (Brazil) Marcio Richardes (10); All: (Japan) Kisho Yano (13)
- Highest home attendance: 40,268 (vs Júbilo Iwata, 5 May 2009)
- Lowest home attendance: 24,392 (vs Oita Trinita, 19 September 2009)
- Average home league attendance: 33,446
Home colours	Away colours

The 2009 Albirex Niigata season was Albirex Niigata's sixth consecutive season in J. League Division 1. It also included the 2009 J. League Cup, and the 2009 Emperor's Cup.

== Competitions ==
=== J. League ===
==== League table ====
Pos	Team	Pld	W	D	L	GF	GA	GD	Pts
6	Urawa Red Diamonds	34	16	4	14	43	43	0	52
7	Shimizu S-Pulse	34	13	12	9	44	41	+3	51
8	Albirex Niigata	34	13	11	10	42	31	+11	50
9	Nagoya Grampus	34	14	8	12	46	42	+4	50
10	Yokohama F. Marinos	34	11	13	10	43	37	+6	46

Updated to match(es) played on December 5, 2009. Source: J.League Division 1
Rules for classification: 1) points; 2) goal difference; 3) number of goals scored.

==== Results summary ====
Overall								Home						Away					
Pld	W	D	L	GF	GA	GD	Pts	W	D	L	GF	GA	GD	W	D	L	GF	GA	GD
34	13	11	10	42	31	+11	50	4	8	5	22	22	0	9	3	5	20	9	+11

Last updated: 1 February 2012.
Source: "J. League". Archived from the original on 2013-03-16.

==== Results by round ====
Round	1	2	3	4	5	6	7	8	9	10	11	12	13	14	15	16	17	18	19	20	21	22	23	24	25	26	27	28	29	30	31	32	33	34
Ground	A	H	A	H	A	H	A	H	A	H	A	H	H	A	H	A	H	A	H	H	A	H	H	A	A	H	A	A	H	A	A	H	A	H
Result	W	W	D	W	L	D	W	D	L	D	W	W	L	W	W	W	D	D	D	D	D	L	L	L	W	D	W	W	L	L	W	L	L	D
Position	2	2	1	1	3	3	2	3	6	5	4	3	3	2	2	2	3	3	2	3	3	3	5	6	6	6	5	5	5	6	5	7	8	8

Source: "J. League". Archived from the original on 2013-03-16.
A = Away; H = Home; W = Win; D = Draw; L = Loss

=== J. League Cup ===
==== Group stage ====
25 March 2009 1	Omiya Ardija	2 – 1	Albirex Niigata	Saitama
19:00 JST	Neretljak 24'; Ishihara 82'	Report	58' Gilton	Stadium: NACK5 Stadium; Attendance: 5,435

29 March 2009 2	Albirex Niigata	0 – 0	Júbilo Iwata	Niigata
14:00 JST		Report		Stadium: Big Swan; Attendance: 20,162

30 May 2009 4	Urawa Reds	2 – 0	Albirex Niigata	Saitama
15:01 JST	Nishizawa 28'; Escudero 56'	Report		Stadium: Saitama Stadium; Attendance: 27,446

3 June 2009 5	Albirex Niigata	0 – 3	Yokohama F. Marinos	Niigata
19:00 JST		Report	38' Hyodo; 45' Chima; 77' Yūsuke Tanaka (football defender)	Stadium: Big Swan; Attendance: 19,011

7 June 2009 6	Sanfrecce Hiroshima	5 – 1	Albirex Niigata	Hiroshima
13:00 JST	Takayanagi 7'; Nakajima 13'; Kashiwagi 44'; Satō 72'; Osaki 86'	Report	4' Matsushita	Stadium: Big Arch; Attendance: 9473

13 June 2009 7	Albirex Niigata	1 – 2	Oita Trinita	Niigata
14:00 JST	Matsushita 44'	Report	00' Umeda; 73' Edmilson	Stadium: Big Swan; Attendance: 20,560

=== Emperor's Cup ===
10 October 2009 2nd round	Nara Club	0 – 3	Albirex Niigata	Sakai
13:00 JST		Report	Everton Santos 6', 15'; Yano 43'	Stadium: Techno Port; Attendance: 3,865; Referee: Jouji Kashihara

31 October 2009 3rd round	Albirex Niigata	3 – 1	Yokohama FC	Niigata
19:00 JST	Matsuo 17'; Yano 28'; Marcio Richardes 89'	Report	8' Namba	Stadium: Big Swan; Attendance: 7,733; Referee: Takuto Okabe

15 November 2009 4th round	Meiji University	1 – 3	Albirex Niigata	Tendō
13:00 JST	Yamamoto 46'	Report	16'Oshima; 40', 64' Yano	Stadium: ND Soft Stadium; Attendance: 3,313; Referee: Junpei Iida

12 December 2009 Quarterfinal	Shimizu S-Pulse	3 – 2 (a.e.t.)	Albirex Niigata	Shizuoka
13:00 JST	Okazaki 12'; Johnsen 86'; Kodama 104'	Report	Matsushita 16' (pen.); Yano 88'	Stadium: Nihondaira Stadium; Attendance: 7,905; Referee: Hajime Matsuo

== Players ==
=== First team squad ===
Note: Flags indicate national team as defined under FIFA eligibility rules; some limited exceptions apply. Players may hold more than one non-FIFA nationality.

No.	Pos.	Nation	Player
1	GK	JPN	Takashi Kitano
2	DF	JPN	Hiroshi Nakano
3	MF	JPN	Kazuhiko Chiba
4	MF	JPN	Jun Marques Davidson
5	DF	JPN	Mitsuru Chiyotanda
6	DF	JPN	Mitsuru Nagata
7	MF	JPN	Toshihiro Matsushita
8	FW	BRA	Everton Santos
9	FW	BRA	Pedro Júnior
10	MF	BRA	Marcio Richardes
11	FW	JPN	Kisho Yano
13	MF	JPN	Fumiya Kogure
14	MF	JPN	Yuta Mikado
15	MF	JPN	Isao Homma

No.	Pos.	Nation	Player
16	FW	JPN	Hideo Ōshima
17	DF	JPN	Jun Uchida
18	FW	JPN	Kengo Kawamata
19	MF	JPN	Kazuya Myodo
20	FW	KOR	Cho Young-Cheol
21	GK	JPN	Masaaki Higashiguchi
22	GK	JPN	Takaya Kurokawa
23	MF	JPN	Atomu Tanaka
24	MF	JPN	Gotoku Sakai
25	DF	JPN	Kazunari Ono
26	DF	JPN	Daisuke Suzuki
27	MF	JPN	Hidetoshi Nakata
28	DF	JPN	Naoto Matsuo
29	DF	BRA	Gilton
30	MF	JPN	Musashi Okuyama

* Players in bold have senior international caps.

=== Out on loan ===
Note: Flags indicate national team as defined under FIFA eligibility rules; some limited exceptions apply. Players may hold more than one non-FIFA nationality.

No.	Pos.	Nation	Player
—	DF	NZL	Michael Fitzgerald (to Japan Soccer College)
—	FW	JPN	Kazuhisa Kawahara (to Tochigi S.C.)
—	FW	BRA	Bruno Castanheira (to Machida Zelvia)

=== Starting XI ===
Last updated on 3 February 2012.

No.	Pos.	Nat.	Name	MS	Notes
1	GK	(Japan)	Takashi Kitano	34	
17	RB	(Japan)	Jun Uchida	32	
5	CB	(Japan)	Mitsuru Chiyotanda	33	
6	CB	(Japan)	Mitsuru Nagata	33	
29	LB	(Brazil)	Gilton	21	Hiroshi Nakano had 6 starts
15	DM	(Japan)	Isao Homma	32	
10	RM	(Brazil)	Marcio Richardes	29	
7	LM	(Japan)	Toshihiro Matsushita	32	
11	RW	(Japan)	Kisho Yano	33	
16	CF	(Japan)	Hideo Ōshima	33	
9	LW	(Brazil)	Pedro Júnior	21	

== Player statistics ==
No.	Pos.	Player	D.o.B. (Age)	J. League 1		Emperor's Cup		J. League Cup		Total	
No.	Pos.	Player	D.o.B. (Age)	Apps	Goals	Apps	Goals	Apps	Goals	Apps	Goals
1	GK	Takashi Kitano	October 4, 1982 (aged 26)	34	0	4	0	4	0	42	0
2	DF	Hiroshi Nakano	October 23, 1983 (aged 25)	8	0	1	0	2	0	11	0
3	MF	Kazuhiko Chiba	June 21, 1985 (aged 23)	13	0	2	0	2	0	17	0
4	MF	Jun Marques Davidson	June 7, 1983 (aged 25)	8	0	0	0	2	0	10	0
5	DF	Mitsuru Chiyotanda	June 1, 1980 (aged 28)	33	1	3	0	5	0	41	1
6	DF	Mitsuru Nagata	April 6, 1983 (aged 25)	33	0	2	0	6	0	42	0
7	MF	Toshihiro Matsushita	October 17, 1983 (aged 25)	34	4	3	1	6	2	43	7
8	FW	Éverton Santos	October 14, 1986 (aged 22)	11	0	2	2	0	0	13	2
9	FW	Pedro Júnior	January 29, 1987 (aged 22)	21	10	0	0	3	0	24	10
10	MF	Marcio Richardes	November 30, 1981 (aged 27)	29	10	3	1	5	0	37	11
11	FW	Kisho Yano	April 5, 1984 (aged 24)	33	8	4	5	1	0	38	13
13	MF	Fumiya Kogure	June 28, 1989 (aged 19)	3	0	1	0	4	0	8	0
14	MF	Yuta Mikado	December 26, 1986 (aged 22)	8	0	4	0	1	0	13	0
15	MF	Isao Homma	April 19, 1981 (aged 27)	32	0	4	0	6	0	42	0
16	FW	Hideo Ōshima	March 7, 1980 (aged 29)	33	4	4	1	6	0	43	5
17	DF	Jun Uchida	October 14, 1977 (aged 31)	32	0	3	0	3	0	38	0
18	FW	Kengo Kawamata	October 14, 1989 (aged 19)	1	0	0	0	1	0	2	0
19	MF	Kazuya Myodo	April 4, 1986 (aged 22)	0	0	0	0	0	0	0	0
20	FW	Cho Young-Cheol	May 31, 1989 (aged 19)	25	1	3	0	6	0	34	1
21	GK	Masaaki Higashiguchi	May 12, 1986 (aged 22)	0	0	0	0	1	0	1	0
22	GK	Takaya Kurokawa	April 7, 1981 (aged 27)	0	0	0	0	1	0	1	0
23	MF	Atomu Tanaka	October 4, 1987 (aged 21)	5	0	2	0	3	0	10	0
24	DF	Gotoku Sakai	March 14, 1991 (aged 17)	18	0	1	0	4	0	23	0
25	DF	Kazunari Ono	August 4, 1989 (aged 19)	0	0	0	0	1	0	1	0
26	DF	Daisuke Suzuki	January 29, 1990 (aged 19)	0	0	1	0	0	0	1	0
27	FW	Bruno Castanheira	May 20, 1990 (aged 18)	0	0	0	0	0	0	0	0
28	DF	Naoto Matsuo	September 10, 1979 (aged 29)	13	1	2	0	5	0	20	1
29	DF	Gilton Ribeiro	March 25, 1989 (aged 19)	25	2	3	0	4	1	32	3
