= 2010 Albirex Niigata season =

Albirex Niigata
2010 season
- Chairman: Mitsugu Tamura
- Manager: Hisashi Kurosaki
- Stadium: Big Swan
- J.League 1: 9th
- Emperor's Cup: 4th Round
- J.League Cup: Group stage
- Top goalscorer: League: Márcio Richardes (16); All: Márcio Richardes (20)
- Highest home attendance: 41,002 (vs Yokohama F. Marinos, 5 May 2010)
- Lowest home attendance: 19,152 (vs Vissel Kobe, 14 November 2010)
- Average home league attendance: 30,542
Home colours	Away colours

The 2010 Albirex Niigata season was Albirex Niigata's seventh consecutive season in J.League Division 1. It also includes the 2010 J.League Cup, and the 2010 Emperor's Cup.

== Competitions ==
=== J.League ===
==== League table ====
Pos	Team	Pld	W	D	L	GF	GA	GD	Pts
7	Sanfrecce Hiroshima	34	14	9	11	45	38	+7	51
8	Yokohama F. Marinos	34	15	6	13	43	39	+4	51
9	Albirex Niigata	34	12	13	9	48	45	+3	49
10	Urawa Red Diamonds	34	14	6	14	48	41	+7	48
11	Júbilo Iwata	34	11	11	12	38	49	−11	44

Updated to match(es) played on December 4, 2010. Source: J.League Division 1
Rules for classification: 1) points; 2) goal difference; 3) number of goals scored.

==== Results summary ====
Overall								Home						Away					
Pld	W	D	L	GF	GA	GD	Pts	W	D	L	GF	GA	GD	W	D	L	GF	GA	GD
34	12	13	9	48	45	+3	49	8	7	2	30	19	+11	4	6	7	18	26	−8

Last updated: 1 February 2012.
Source: "J.League". Archived from the original on 2012-10-14.

==== Results by round ====
Round	1	2	3	4	5	6	7	8	9	10	11	12	13	14	15	16	17	18	19	20	21	22	23	24	25	26	27	28	29	30	31	32	33	34
Ground	A	H	A	A	H	H	A	H	A	H	A	H	H	A	A	H	A	A	H	H	A	H	H	A	A	H	A	H	A	H	A	H	A	H
Result	L	D	D	L	D	L	D	D	W	W	W	W	D	W	D	W	W	L	W	W	L	L	D	L	L	W	D	W	D	D	L	D	D	W
Position	12	12	13	15	18	18	18	18	15	13	8	7	10	8	9	7	5	7	7	6	8	8	8	9	10	10	10	8	9	10	10	10	10	9

Source: "J.League". Archived from the original on 2012-10-14.
A = Away; H = Home; W = Win; D = Draw; L = Loss

=== J.League Cup ===
==== Group stage ====
31 March 2010 1	Albirex Niigata	0 – 0	Vegalta Sendai	Niigata
19:00 JST		Report		Stadium: Big Swan; Attendance: 16,234

14 April 2010 2	Cerezo Osaka	0 – 1	Albirex Niigata	Osaka
19:00 JST		Report	76' Michael	Stadium: Kincho Stadium; Attendance: 4,774

22 May 2010 3	FC Tokyo	1 – 0	Albirex Niigata	Chōfu
19:00 JST	Otake 90+4'	Report		Stadium: Ajinomoto Stadium; Attendance: 13,098

26 May 2010 4	Albirex Niigata	1 – 4	Kyoto Sanga	Niigata
19:00 JST	Suzuki 81'	Report	32', 40' Yanagisawa; 63' Dutra; 74' Diego	Stadium: Big Swan; Attendance: 14,278

29 May 2010 4	Albirex Niigata	1 – 0	Omiya Ardija	Niigata
19:00 JST	Márcio Richardes 82'	Report		Stadium: Big Swan; Attendance: 21,916

9 June 2010 7	Nagoya Grampus	0 – 2	Albirex Niigata	Nagoya
19:00 JST		Report	20' Márcio Richardes; 56' Michael	Stadium: Mizuho Stadium; Attendance: 3,909

=== Emperor's Cup ===
5 September 2010 2nd round	Albirex Niigata	3 – 0	Zweigen Kanazawa	Niigata
18:00 JST	Márcio Richardes 53', 90+2'; Suzuki 86'	Report		Stadium: Big Swan; Attendance: 5,664; Referee: Masayoshi Okada

9 October 2010 3rd round	Albirex Niigata	2 – 1	Machida Zelvia	Niigata
13:00 JST	Tanaka 23', 45+2'	Report	49' Ota	Stadium: Big Swan; Attendance: 5,645; Referee: Joji Kashihara

17 November 2010 4th round	Nagoya Grampus	1 – 1 (a.e.t.) (5 – 4 p)	Albirex Niigata	Nagoya
19:00 JST	Alex Santos 7'	Report	68' Tanaka	Stadium: Mizuho Stadium; Attendance: 3,540; Referee: Yasuro Imamura
	Penalties
	Alex Santos (penalty scored); Y. Maki (penalty scored); Taguchi (penalty scored); K. Hashimoto (penalty scored); Isomura (penalty scored)		(penalty scored) Chiba; (penalty scored) D. Nishi; (penalty scored) Homma; (penalty missed) Kato; (penalty scored) Michael

== Players ==
=== First team squad ===
Note: Flags indicate national team as defined under FIFA eligibility rules; some limited exceptions apply. Players may hold more than one non-FIFA nationality.

No.	Pos.	Nation	Player
1	GK	(Japan) JPN	Takaya Kurokawa
2	DF	(Japan) JPN	Kazunari Ōno
3	MF	(Japan) JPN	Kazuhiko Chiba
4	DF	(Japan) JPN	Daisuke Suzuki
6	DF	(Japan) JPN	Mitsuru Nagata
7	MF	(Brazil) BRA	João Paulo
8	MF	(Brazil) BRA	Michael
9	FW	(South Korea) KOR	Cho Young-Cheol
10	MF	(Brazil) BRA	Márcio Richardes
11	FW	(Japan) JPN	Kisho Yano
13	MF	(Japan) JPN	Fumiya Kogure
14	MF	(Japan) JPN	Yuta Mikado
15	MF	(Japan) JPN	Isao Homma (captain)
16	FW	(Japan) JPN	Hideo Ōshima
17	DF	(Japan) JPN	Jun Uchida

No.	Pos.	Nation	Player
18	FW	(Japan) JPN	Kengo Kawamata
19	MF	(Japan) JPN	Kazuya Myodo
20	FW	(Japan) JPN	Kazuhisa Kawahara
21	GK	(Japan) JPN	Masaaki Higashiguchi
22	MF	(Japan) JPN	Daigo Nishi
23	MF	(Japan) JPN	Atomu Tanaka
24	DF	(Japan) JPN	Gotoku Sakai
25	MF	(Japan) JPN	Musashi Okuyama
26	DF	(Japan) JPN	Hiroshi Nakano
27	MF	(Japan) JPN	Hidetoshi Nakata
28	GK	(Japan) JPN	Takahiro Takagi
29	MF	(Japan) JPN	Masaru Kato
30	FW	(Brazil) BRA	Fagner
31	GK	(Japan) JPN	Yasuhiro Watanabe (youth)
32	MF	(Japan) JPN	Yoshiyuki Kobayashi
34	DF	(Japan) JPN	Yohei Iwasaki

=== Out on loan ===
Note: Flags indicate national team as defined under FIFA eligibility rules; some limited exceptions apply. Players may hold more than one non-FIFA nationality.

No.	Pos.	Nation	Player
—	DF	(New Zealand) NZL	Michael Fitzgerald (to Zweigen Kanazawa)
—	MF	(Japan) JPN	Ayato Hasebe (to Zweigen Kanazawa)
—	FW	(Japan) JPN	Bruno Castanheira (to Machida Zelvia)

=== Starting XI ===
Last updated on 3 February 2012.

No.	Pos.	Nat.	Name	MS	Notes
21	GK	(Japan)	Masaaki Higashiguchi	24	Takaya Kurokawa had 10 starts
22	RB	(Japan)	Daigo Nishi	26	Jun Uchida had 8 starts
3	CB	(Japan)	Kazuhiko Chiba	33	
6	CB	(Japan)	Mitsuru Nagata	34	
24	LB	(Japan)	Gotoku Sakai	28	
15	DM	(Japan)	Isao Homma	31	
32	DM	(Japan)	Yoshiyuki Kobayashi	23	Yuta Mikado had 10 starts
10	RM	(Brazil)	Márcio Richardes	26	
9	LM	(South Korea)	Cho Young-Cheol	28	
8	SS	(Brazil)	Michael	23	Hideo Ōshima had 6 starts
11	FW	(Japan)	Kisho Yano	19	Hideo Ōshima had 14 starts

== Player statistics ==
No.	Pos.	Player	D.o.B. (Age)	J.League 1		Emperor's Cup		J.League Cup		Total	
No.	Pos.	Player	D.o.B. (Age)	Apps	Goals	Apps	Goals	Apps	Goals	Apps	Goals
1	GK	Takaya Kurokawa	April 7, 1981 (aged 28)	11	0	1	0	1	0	13	0
2	DF	Kazunari Ono	August 4, 1989 (aged 20)	4	0	1	0	0	0	5	0
3	MF	Kazuhiko Chiba	June 21, 1985 (aged 24)	33	0	3	0	5	0	41	0
4	DF	Daisuke Suzuki	January 29, 1990 (aged 20)	5	0	2	1	1	1	8	2
6	DF	Mitsuru Nagata	April 6, 1983 (aged 26)	34	0	2	0	6	0	42	0
7	MF	Joao Paulo	February 22, 1985 (aged 25)	8	0	0	0	1	0	9	0
8	MF	Michael	January 21, 1982 (aged 28)	27	4	2	0	6	2	35	6
9	FW	Cho Young-Cheol	May 31, 1989 (aged 20)	29	11	0	0	6	0	35	11
10	MF	Márcio Richardes	November 30, 1981 (aged 28)	26	16	2	2	6	2	34	20
11	FW	Kisho Yano	April 5, 1984 (aged 25)	20	3	0	0	2	0	22	3
13	MF	Fumiya Kogure	June 28, 1989 (aged 20)	7	0	1	0	4	0	12	0
14	MF	Yuta Mikado	December 26, 1986 (aged 23)	32	3	3	0	5	0	40	3
15	MF	Isao Homma	April 19, 1981 (aged 28)	32	3	3	0	6	0	41	3
16	FW	Hideo Ōshima	March 7, 1980 (aged 29)	28	4	3	0	5	0	36	4
17	DF	Jun Uchida	October 14, 1977 (aged 32)	18	0	3	0	4	0	24	0
18	FW	Kengo Kawamata	October 14, 1989 (aged 20)	4	0	2	0	0	0	6	0
19	MF	Kazuya Myodo	April 4, 1986 (aged 23)	6	0	0	0	0	0	6	0
20	FW	Kazuhisa Kawahara	January 29, 1987 (aged 23)	4	0	0	0	0	0	4	0
21	GK	Masaaki Higashiguchi	May 12, 1986 (aged 23)	25	0	2	0	5	0	32	0
22	DF	Daigo Nishi	August 28, 1987 (aged 22)	29	1	3	0	6	0	38	1
23	MF	Atomu Tanaka	October 4, 1987 (aged 22)	10	1	3	3	3	0	16	4
24	DF	Gotoku Sakai	March 14, 1991 (aged 18)	31	0	0	0	4	0	35	0
25	MF	Musashi Okuyama	May 15, 1991 (aged 18)	0	0	0	0	0	0	0	0
26	DF	Hiroshi Nakano	October 23, 1983 (aged 26)	8	0	1	0	4	0	13	0
27	FW	Bruno Castanheira	May 20, 1990 (aged 19)	0	0	0	0	0	0	0	0
28	GK	Takahiro Takagi	July 1, 1982 (aged 27)	0	0	0	0	0	0	0	0
29	MF	Masaru Kato	May 7, 1991 (aged 18)	4	0	2	0	0	0	6	0
30	FW	Fagner	August 24, 1990 (aged 19)	9	1	0	0	3	0	12	1
32	MF	Yoshiyuki Kobayashi	January 27, 1978 (aged 32)	28	0	2	0	5	0	35	0
33	GK	Daiki Kanei	December 8, 1987 (aged 22)	0	0	0	0	0	0	0	0
34	DF	Yohei Iwasaki	March 24, 1987 (aged 22)	0	0	0	0	0	0	0	0
