= 2008 Albirex Niigata season =

Albirex Niigata
2008 season
- Manager: Jun Suzuki
- Stadium: Tohoku Denryoku Big Swan Stadium
- J. League 1: 13th
- Emperor's Cup: 5th Round
- J. League Cup: GL-D 3rd
- Top goalscorer: Alessandro Nunes (13)
- Average home league attendance: 34,490
Home colours	Away colours

2008 Albirex Niigata season

== Competitions ==
Competitions	Position
J. League 1	13th / 18 clubs
Emperor's Cup	5th Round
J. League Cup	GL-D 3rd / 4 clubs

== Domestic results ==
=== J. League 1 ===
Pos	Team	Pld	W	D	L	GF	GA	GD	Pts
11	Kashiwa Reysol	34	13	7	14	48	45	+3	46
12	Omiya Ardija	34	12	7	15	36	45	−9	43
13	Albirex Niigata	34	11	9	14	32	46	−14	42
14	Kyoto Sanga	34	11	8	15	37	46	−9	41
15	JEF United Chiba	34	10	8	16	36	53	−17	38

Updated to match(es) played on December 6, 2008. Source: J. League Division 1
Rules for classification: 1) points; 2) goal difference; 3) number of goals scored.

Match	Date	Venue	Opponents	Score
1	2008..			-
2	2008..			-
3	2008..			-
4	2008..			-
5	2008..			-
6	2008..			-
7	2008..			-
8	2008..			-
9	2008..			-
10	2008..			-
11	2008..			-
12	2008..			-
13	2008..			-
14	2008..			-
15	2008..			-
16	2008..			-
17	2008..			-
18	2008..			-
19	2008..			-
20	2008..			-
21	2008..			-
22	2008..			-
23	2008..			-
24	2008..			-
25	2008..			-
26	2008..			-
27	2008..			-
28	2008..			-
29	2008..			-
30	2008..			-
31	2008..			-
32	2008..			-
33	2008..			-
34	2008..			-

=== Emperor's Cup ===
Match	Date	Venue	Opponents	Score
4th Round	2008..			-
5th Round	2008..			-

=== J. League Cup ===
Match	Date	Venue	Opponents	Score
GL-D-1	2008..			-
GL-D-2	2008..			-
GL-D-3	2008..			-
GL-D-4	2008..			-
GL-D-5	2008..			-
GL-D-6	2008..			-

== Player statistics ==
No.	Pos.	Player	D.o.B. (Age)	Height / Weight	J. League 1		Emperor's Cup		J. League Cup		Total	
No.	Pos.	Player	D.o.B. (Age)	Height / Weight	Apps	Goals	Apps	Goals	Apps	Goals	Apps	Goals
1	GK	Takashi Kitano	October 4, 1982 (aged 25)	cm / kg	32	0						
2	DF	Hiroshi Nakano	October 23, 1983 (aged 24)	cm / kg	11	0						
3	DF	Kazuhiko Chiba	June 21, 1985 (aged 22)	cm / kg	31	0						
5	DF	Mitsuru Chiyotanda	June 1, 1980 (aged 27)	cm / kg	32	2						
6	DF	Mitsuru Nagata	April 6, 1983 (aged 24)	cm / kg	30	1						
7	MF	Toshihiro Matsushita	October 17, 1983 (aged 24)	cm / kg	28	2						
8	MF	Davi	June 4, 1984 (aged 23)	cm / kg	10	0						
8	MF	Augusto	November 20, 1983 (aged 24)	cm / kg	4	0						
9	FW	Alessandro Nunes	March 2, 1982 (aged 26)	cm / kg	30	13						
10	MF	Marcio Richardes	November 30, 1981 (aged 26)	cm / kg	24	3						
11	FW	Kisho Yano	April 5, 1984 (aged 23)	cm / kg	33	6						
13	MF	Fumiya Kogure	June 28, 1989 (aged 18)	cm / kg	12	0						
15	MF	Isao Homma	April 19, 1981 (aged 26)	cm / kg	25	1						
16	MF	Yoshito Terakawa	September 6, 1974 (aged 33)	cm / kg	27	0						
17	DF	Jun Uchida	October 14, 1977 (aged 30)	cm / kg	33	2						
18	FW	Kengo Kawamata	October 14, 1989 (aged 18)	cm / kg	1	0						
19	DF	Keiji Kaimoto	November 26, 1972 (aged 35)	cm / kg	9	0						
20	FW	Kazuhisa Kawahara	January 29, 1987 (aged 21)	cm / kg	18	0						
21	GK	Yosuke Nozawa	November 9, 1979 (aged 28)	cm / kg	2	0						
22	GK	Takaya Kurokawa	April 7, 1981 (aged 26)	cm / kg	0	0						
23	MF	Atomu Tanaka	October 4, 1987 (aged 20)	cm / kg	25	1						
24	DF	Ayato Hasebe	February 6, 1990 (aged 18)	cm / kg	1	0						
25	DF	Kazunari Ono	August 4, 1989 (aged 18)	cm / kg	0	0						
26	DF	Daisuke Suzuki	January 29, 1990 (aged 18)	cm / kg	0	0						
27	DF	Michael James	September 17, 1988 (aged 19)	cm / kg	0	0						
28	DF	Naoto Matsuo	September 10, 1979 (aged 28)	cm / kg	30	1						
29	DF	Gotoku Sakai	March 14, 1991 (aged 16)	cm / kg	0	0						

== Other pages ==
- (in Japanese) J. League official site
