= 2007 Albirex Niigata season =

Albirex Niigata
2007 season
- Manager: Jun Suzuki
- Stadium: Tohoku Denryoku Big Swan Stadium
- J. League 1: 6th
- Emperor's Cup: 4th Round
- J. League Cup: GL-D 3rd
- Top goalscorer: Edmilson (19)
- Average home league attendance: 38,276
Home colours	Away colours

2007 Albirex Niigata season

== Competitions ==
Competitions	Position
J. League 1	6th / 18 clubs
Emperor's Cup	4th Round
J. League Cup	GL-D 3rd / 4 clubs

== Domestic results ==
=== J. League 1 ===
Pos	Team	Pld	W	D	L	GF	GA	GD	Pts
4	Shimizu S-Pulse	34	18	7	9	53	36	+17	61
5	Kawasaki Frontale	34	14	12	8	66	48	+18	54
6	Albirex Niigata	34	15	6	13	48	47	+1	51
7	Yokohama F. Marinos	34	14	8	12	54	35	+19	50
8	Kashiwa Reysol	34	14	8	12	43	36	+7	50

Updated to match(es) played on December 1, 2007. Source: J. League Division 1
Rules for classification: 1) points; 2) goal difference; 3) number of goals scored.

Match	Date	Venue	Opponents	Score
1	2007..			-
2	2007..			-
3	2007..			-
4	2007..			-
5	2007..			-
6	2007..			-
7	2007..			-
8	2007..			-
9	2007..			-
10	2007..			-
11	2007..			-
12	2007..			-
13	2007..			-
14	2007..			-
15	2007..			-
16	2007..			-
17	2007..			-
18	2007..			-
19	2007..			-
20	2007..			-
21	2007..			-
22	2007..			-
23	2007..			-
24	2007..			-
25	2007..			-
26	2007..			-
27	2007..			-
28	2007..			-
29	2007..			-
30	2007..			-
31	2007..			-
32	2007..			-
33	2007..			-
34	2007..			-

=== Emperor's Cup ===
Match	Date	Venue	Opponents	Score
4th Round	2007..			-

=== J. League Cup ===
Match	Date	Venue	Opponents	Score
GL-D-1	2007..			-
GL-D-2	2007..			-
GL-D-3	2007..			-
GL-D-4	2007..			-
GL-D-5	2007..			-
GL-D-6	2007..			-

== Player statistics ==
No.	Pos.	Player	D.o.B. (Age)	Height / Weight	J. League 1		Emperor's Cup		J. League Cup		Total	
No.	Pos.	Player	D.o.B. (Age)	Height / Weight	Apps	Goals	Apps	Goals	Apps	Goals	Apps	Goals
1	GK	Takashi Kitano	October 4, 1982 (aged 24)	cm / kg	34	0						
2	DF	Hikaru Mita	August 1, 1981 (aged 25)	cm / kg	4	0						
3	DF	Kazuhiko Chiba	June 21, 1985 (aged 21)	cm / kg	27	0						
4	MF	Jun Marques Davidson	June 7, 1983 (aged 23)	cm / kg	0	0						
5	DF	Mitsuru Chiyotanda	June 1, 1980 (aged 26)	cm / kg	33	2						
6	DF	Mitsuru Nagata	April 6, 1983 (aged 23)	cm / kg	22	0						
7	MF	Toshihiro Matsushita	October 17, 1983 (aged 23)	cm / kg	25	0						
8	MF	Silvinho	January 17, 1977 (aged 30)	cm / kg	22	1						
9	FW	Masaki Fukai	September 13, 1980 (aged 26)	cm / kg	18	2						
10	FW	Edmilson	September 15, 1982 (aged 24)	cm / kg	29	19						
11	FW	Kisho Yano	April 5, 1984 (aged 22)	cm / kg	33	7						
13	DF	Hideya Tanaka	June 25, 1986 (aged 20)	cm / kg	0	0						
14	MF	Masataka Sakamoto	February 24, 1978 (aged 29)	cm / kg	34	2						
15	MF	Isao Homma	April 19, 1981 (aged 25)	cm / kg	30	2						
16	MF	Yoshito Terakawa	September 6, 1974 (aged 32)	cm / kg	18	0						
17	DF	Jun Uchida	October 14, 1977 (aged 29)	cm / kg	30	2						
18	MF	Shingo Suzuki	March 20, 1978 (aged 28)	cm / kg	17	0						
19	DF	Keiji Kaimoto	November 26, 1972 (aged 34)	cm / kg	0	0						
20	FW	Kazuhisa Kawahara	January 29, 1987 (aged 20)	cm / kg	14	1						
21	GK	Yosuke Nozawa	November 9, 1979 (aged 27)	cm / kg	0	0						
22	GK	Yudai Suwa	May 5, 1986 (aged 20)	cm / kg	0	0						
23	MF	Atomu Tanaka	October 4, 1987 (aged 19)	cm / kg	11	1						
24	MF	Takuya Muguruma	June 13, 1984 (aged 22)	cm / kg	0	0						
25	MF	Shogo Yoshizawa	July 26, 1986 (aged 20)	cm / kg	0	0						
26	DF	Hiroshi Nakano	October 23, 1983 (aged 23)	cm / kg	7	0						
27	MF	Marcio Richardes	November 30, 1981 (aged 25)	cm / kg	28	9						
28	DF	Naoto Matsuo	September 10, 1979 (aged 27)	cm / kg	20	0						

== Other pages ==
- (in Japanese) J. League official site
