= 2011 Albirex Niigata season =

Albirex Niigata
2011 season
- Chairman: Mitsugu Tamura
- Manager: Hisashi Kurosaki
- Stadium: Big Swan
- J.League Division 1: 14th
- Emperor's Cup: 3rd round
- J. League Cup: Quarterfinal
- Top goalscorer: League: Bruno Lopes (13); All: Bruno Lopes (16)
- Highest home attendance: 37,830 (vs Shimizu S-Pulse, 6 August 2011)
- Lowest home attendance: 13,644 (vs Ventforet Kofu, 13 July 2011)
- Average home league attendance: 26,049
Home colours	Away colours

The 2011 Albirex Niigata season was Albirex Niigata's eighth consecutive season in J.League Division 1. It also includes the 2011 J. League Cup, and the 2011 Emperor's Cup.

== Match results ==
=== J. League ===
==== League table ====
Pos	Team	Pld	W	D	L	GF	GA	GD	Pts	Qualification or relegation
12	Cerezo Osaka	34	11	10	13	67	53	+14	43	
13	Omiya Ardija	34	10	12	12	38	48	−10	42	
14	Albirex Niigata	34	10	9	15	38	46	−8	39	
15	Urawa Red Diamonds	34	8	12	14	36	43	−7	36	
16	Ventforet Kofu (R)	34	9	6	19	42	63	−21	33	Relegation to 2012 J.League Division 2

Updated to match(es) played on December 3, 2011. Source: J. League Division 1
Rules for classification: 1st points; 2nd goal differential; 3rd goals scored; 4th head-to-head results; 5th disciplinary points; 6th draw. The winners of the 2011 Emperor's Cup, FC Tokyo, which played in the 2011 J.League Division 2, also qualified for the group stage of the 2012 AFC Champions League. If two clubs are tied for first place, both clubs will be declared champions.
(R) Relegated

==== Results summary ====
Overall								Home						Away					
Pld	W	D	L	GF	GA	GD	Pts	W	D	L	GF	GA	GD	W	D	L	GF	GA	GD
34	10	9	15	38	46	−8	39	6	6	5	25	20	+5	4	3	10	13	26	−13

Last updated: 1 February 2012.
Source: "J. League". Archived from the original on 2012-10-14.

==== Results by round ====
Round	1	2	3	4	5	6	7	8	9	10	11	12	13	14	15	16	17	18	19	20	21	22	23	24	25	26	27	28	29	30	31	32	33	34
Ground	A	H	A	H	A	H	A	A	H	A	H	A	H	H	H	A	A	H	A	H	H	A	H	A	H	A	A	H	A	H	A	H	A	H
Result	W	D	D	W	D	L	L	D	L	L	D	L	D	W	L	W	L	W	W	W	L	L	D	L	D	L	L	W	W	W	L	D	L	L
Position	1	2	4	4	5	7	9	10	11	13	15	15	15	14	14	14	11	11	15	13	11	9	13	13	13	14	13	13	13	11	15	13	13	14

Source: "J. League". Archived from the original on 2012-10-14.
A = Away; H = Home; W = Win; D = Draw; L = Loss

=== J. League Cup ===
14 September 2011 2nd round – 1st leg	Shimizu S-Pulse	2–1	Albirex Niigata	Shimizu
19:04 JST	Omae 16'; Alex 74'	Report	6' Homma	Stadium: Nihondaira Stadium; Attendance: 6,939

28 September 2011 2nd round – 2nd leg	Albirex Niigata	3–1	Shimizu S-Pulse	Niigata
19:03 JST	Bruno Lopes 36'; Tanaka 55'; Michael 58'	Report	25' Omae	Stadium: Big Swan; Attendance: 10,024

5 October 2011 Quarterfinal	Nagoya Grampus	5–3 (a.e.t.)	Albirex Niigata	Nagoya
19:00	Kanazaki 15'; Nagai 90+1', 105+2'; Hashimoto 114'; Tulio 120+1'	Report	63' Bruno Lopes; 90+3' Kawamata; 98' Kikuchi	Stadium: Mizuho Stadium; Attendance: 4,108

=== Emperor's Cup ===
12 October 2011 2nd round	Albirex Niigata	5–0	Toyama Shinjo Club	Niigata
19:00 JST	Bruno Lopes 36'; Kawamata 21'; Kogure 23'; Kawamata 76'; Uchida 94'	Report		Stadium: Big Swan; Attendance: 3,597

16 November 2011 3rd round	Albirex Niigata	0–1	Matsumoto Yamaga	Niigata
19:00 JST		Report	94' Tatara	Stadium: Big Swan; Attendance: 4,842

== Players ==
=== First team squad ===
Note: Flags indicate national team as defined under FIFA eligibility rules; some limited exceptions apply. Players may hold more than one non-FIFA nationality.

No.	Pos.	Nation	Player
1	GK	JPN	Takaya Kurokawa
3	MF	JPN	Kazuhiko Chiba
4	DF	JPN	Daisuke Suzuki
5	DF	JPN	Naoki Ishikawa
6	MF	JPN	Yuta Mikado
7	FW	BRA	Anderson
8	MF	JPN	Fumiya Kogure
9	FW	KOR	Cho Young-Cheol
10	MF	BRA	Michael
11	FW	BRA	Bruno Lopes
13	MF	JPN	Masaru Kato
14	MF	JPN	Seiya Fujita
15	MF	JPN	Isao Homma (captain)
17	DF	JPN	Jun Uchida
18	FW	JPN	Kengo Kawamata
19	DF	JPN	Ayato Hasebe

No.	Pos.	Nation	Player
20	DF	JPN	Shigeto Masuda
21	GK	JPN	Masaaki Higashiguchi
22	GK	JPN	Yasuhiro Watanabe
23	MF	JPN	Atomu Tanaka
24	DF	JPN	Gotoku Sakai
26	DF	JPN	Yusuke Murakami
27	MF	JPN	Hidetoshi Nakata
28	MF	BRA	Rafael
29	FW	JPN	Noriyoshi Sakai
30	GK	JPN	Hideaki Ozawa
31	MF	JPN	Fumiya Hayakawa (youth)
32	MF	JPN	Yoshiyuki Kobayashi
33	DF	JPN	Ryoma Nishimura (youth)
34	DF	JPN	Yohei Iwasaki
36	DF	JPN	Naoya Kikuchi
39	GK	JPN	Yohei Takeda (on loan from Shimizu S-Pulse)

=== Out on loan ===
Note: Flags indicate national team as defined under FIFA eligibility rules; some limited exceptions apply. Players may hold more than one non-FIFA nationality.

No.	Pos.	Nation	Player
—	DF	NZL	Michael Fitzgerald (to Zweigen Kanazawa)
—	DF	JPN	Kazunari Ono (to Ehime FC)
—	MF	JPN	Musashi Okuyama (to Albirex Niigata Singapore)

No.	Pos.	Nation	Player
—	FW	JPN	Bruno Castanheira (to Albirex Niigata Singapore)
—	FW	JPN	Kazuhisa Kawahara (to Tochigi SC)
—	FW	JPN	Hideo Ōshima (to JEF United Chiba)

=== Starting XI ===
Last updated on 3 February 2012.

No.	Pos.	Nat.	Name	MS	Notes
30	GK	(Japan)	Hideaki Ozawa	15	Masaaki Higashiguchi had 14 starts
25	RB	(Japan)	Yusuke Murakami	15	Seiya Fujita had 12 starts
3	CB	(Japan)	Kazuhiko Chiba	28	
4	CB	(Japan)	Daisuke Suzuki	20	Naoya Kikuchi had 14 starts
24	LB	(Japan)	Gotoku Sakai	23	Naoki Ishikawa had 9 starts
15	DM	(Japan)	Isao Homma	34	
32	DM	(Japan)	Yoshiyuki Kobayashi	14	Naoya Kikuchi had 9 starts
23	RM	(Japan)	Atomu Tanaka	22	
9	LM	(South Korea)	Cho Young-Cheol	21	Fumiya Kogure had 6 starts
10	SS	(Brazil)	Michael	25	Kengo Kawamata had 5 starts
11	CF	(Brazil)	Bruno Lopes	32	
