= 2006 Albirex Niigata season =

Albirex Niigata
2006 season
- Manager: Jun Suzuki
- Stadium: Niigata Stadium
- J. League 1: 14th
- Emperor's Cup: 5th Round
- J. League Cup: GL-C 3rd
- Top goalscorer: Edmilson (10)
- Average home league attendance: 38,709
Home colours	Away colours

2006 Albirex Niigata season

== Competitions ==
Competitions	Position
J. League 1	14th / 18 clubs
Emperor's Cup	5th Round
J. League Cup	GL-C 3rd / 4 clubs

== Domestic results ==
=== J. League 1 ===
Pos	Team	Pld	W	D	L	GF	GA	GD	Pts	Qualification or relegation
12	Omiya Ardija	34	13	5	16	43	55	−12	44	
13	FC Tokyo	34	13	4	17	56	65	−9	43	
14	Albirex Niigata	34	12	6	16	46	65	−19	42	
15	Ventforet Kofu	34	12	6	16	42	64	−22	42	
16	Avispa Fukuoka (R)	34	5	12	17	32	56	−24	27	2006 promotion/relegation Series

Updated to match(es) played on December 2, 2006. Source: J. League Division 1
Rules for classification: 1) points; 2) goal difference; 3) number of goals scored.
(R) Relegated

Match	Date	Venue	Opponents	Score
1	2006..			-
2	2006..			-
3	2006..			-
4	2006..			-
5	2006..			-
6	2006..			-
7	2006..			-
8	2006..			-
9	2006..			-
10	2006..			-
11	2006..			-
12	2006..			-
13	2006..			-
14	2006..			-
15	2006..			-
16	2006..			-
17	2006..			-
18	2006..			-
19	2006..			-
20	2006..			-
21	2006..			-
22	2006..			-
23	2006..			-
24	2006..			-
25	2006..			-
26	2006..			-
27	2006..			-
28	2006..			-
29	2006..			-
30	2006..			-
31	2006..			-
32	2006..			-
33	2006..			-
34	2006..			-

=== Emperor's Cup ===
Match	Date	Venue	Opponents	Score
4th Round	2006..			-
5th Round	2006..			-

=== J. League Cup ===
Match	Date	Venue	Opponents	Score
GL-C-1	2006..			-
GL-C-2	2006..			-
GL-C-3	2006..			-
GL-C-4	2006..			-
GL-C-5	2006..			-
GL-C-6	2006..			-

== Player statistics ==
No.	Pos.	Player	D.o.B. (Age)	Height / Weight	J. League 1		Emperor's Cup		J. League Cup		Total	
No.	Pos.	Player	D.o.B. (Age)	Height / Weight	Apps	Goals	Apps	Goals	Apps	Goals	Apps	Goals
1	GK	Takashi Kitano	October 4, 1982 (aged 23)	cm / kg	24	0						
2	DF	Hikaru Mita	August 1, 1981 (aged 24)	cm / kg	24	1						
3	DF	Kazuhiko Chiba	June 21, 1985 (aged 20)	cm / kg	14	0						
4	DF	Kentaro Suzuki	June 2, 1980 (aged 25)	cm / kg	0	0						
5	DF	Osamu Umeyama	August 16, 1973 (aged 32)	cm / kg	24	0						
6	DF	Mitsuru Nagata	April 6, 1983 (aged 22)	cm / kg	0	0						
7	MF	Daisuke Aono	September 19, 1979 (aged 26)	cm / kg	0	0						
8	MF	Silvinho	January 17, 1977 (aged 29)	cm / kg	30	3						
9	MF	Fabinho	June 26, 1973 (aged 32)	cm / kg	23	4						
10	FW	Edmilson	September 15, 1982 (aged 23)	cm / kg	25	10						
11	FW	Kisho Yano	April 5, 1984 (aged 21)	cm / kg	33	6						
13	MF	Katsuyuki Miyazawa	September 15, 1976 (aged 29)	cm / kg	4	0						
14	FW	Takayuki Nakahara	November 18, 1984 (aged 21)	cm / kg	15	2						
15	MF	Isao Homma	April 19, 1981 (aged 24)	cm / kg	14	1						
16	MF	Yoshito Terakawa	September 6, 1974 (aged 31)	cm / kg	33	1						
17	DF	Kojiro Kaimoto	October 14, 1977 (aged 28)	cm / kg	5	0						
17	DF	Jun Uchida	October 14, 1977 (aged 28)	cm / kg	14	1						
18	MF	Shingo Suzuki	March 20, 1978 (aged 27)	cm / kg	34	9						
19	DF	Keiji Kaimoto	November 26, 1972 (aged 33)	cm / kg	31	1						
20	MF	Tetsuya Okayama	August 27, 1973 (aged 32)	cm / kg	16	0						
21	GK	Yosuke Nozawa	November 9, 1979 (aged 26)	cm / kg	10	0						
23	MF	Masashi Otani	April 17, 1983 (aged 22)	cm / kg	0	0						
24	FW	Kosei Nakamura	April 5, 1981 (aged 24)	cm / kg	0	0						
25	MF	Akihiro Kurihara	May 2, 1985 (aged 20)	cm / kg	0	0						
26	DF	Hiroshi Nakano	October 23, 1983 (aged 22)	cm / kg	25	0						
27	FW	Kazuhisa Kawahara	January 29, 1987 (aged 19)	cm / kg	5	1						
28	FW	Yuzo Funakoshi	June 12, 1977 (aged 28)	cm / kg	4	0						
29	DF	Yasushi Kita	April 25, 1978 (aged 27)	cm / kg	11	0						
30	GK	Yudai Suwa	May 5, 1986 (aged 19)	cm / kg	0	0						
31	DF	Daisuke Fujii	October 15, 1986 (aged 19)	cm / kg	6	0						
32	MF	Atomu Tanaka	October 4, 1987 (aged 18)	cm / kg	22	1						
33	DF	Yuki Sakai	June 28, 1985 (aged 20)	cm / kg	0	0						
34	MF	Takuya Muguruma	June 13, 1984 (aged 21)	cm / kg	2	0						
35	MF	Toshihiro Matsushita	October 17, 1983 (aged 22)	cm / kg	19	3						

== Other pages ==
- (in Japanese) J. League official site
