= Mitsuru Nagata =

Japanese footballer

Mitsuru Nagata 永田 充
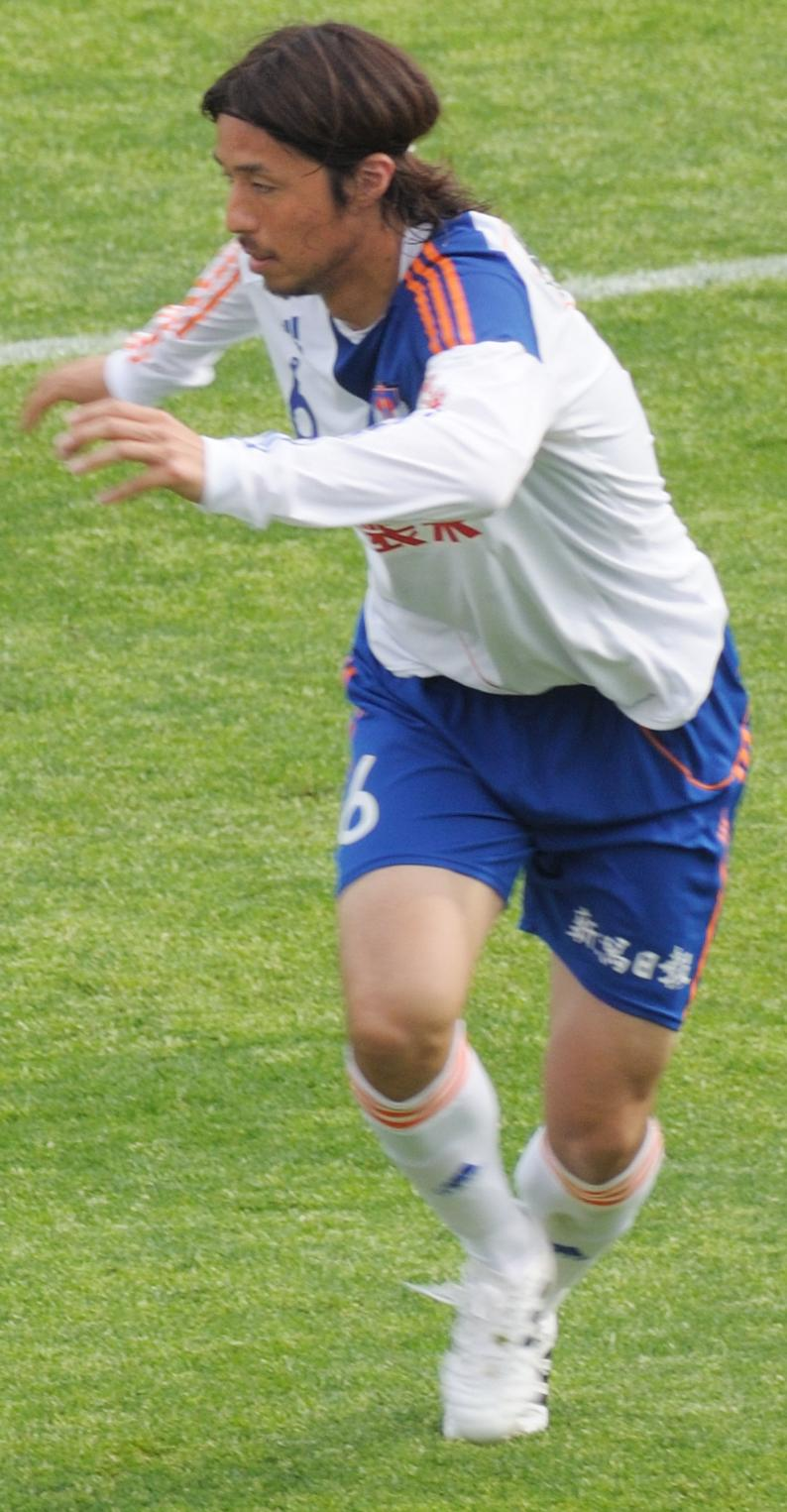
- Nagata playing for Albirex Niigata

Personal information
- Full name: Mitsuru Nagata
- Date of birth: 6 April 1983 (age 43)
- Place of birth: Shizuoka, Japan
- Height: 1.84 m (6 ft 1/2 in)
- Position: Centre back

Youth career
- 1999–2001: Shizuoka Gakuen High School

Senior career*
Years	Team	Apps	(Gls)
2002–2005	Kashiwa Reysol	62	(3)
2006–2010	Albirex Niigata	119	(1)
2011–2016	Urawa Reds	91	(2)
2017–2018	Tokyo Verdy	10	(0)
2019	Tokyo United FC	7	(0)
Total		282	(6)

International career
2002–2003	Japan U-20	9	(0)
2010–2011	Japan	2	(0)
Medal record
Urawa Reds
Runner-up	J1 League	2014
Runner-up	J1 League	2016
Winner	J.League Cup	2016
Runner-up	J.League Cup	2011
Runner-up	J.League Cup	2013
Runner-up	Emperor's Cup	2015
Representing Japan
AFC Asian Cup
Gold medal – first place	2011 Qatar
AFC U-19 Championship
Silver medal – second place	2002 Qatar
- * Club domestic league appearances and goals

Mitsuru Nagata (永田 充, Nagata Mitsuru; born 6 April 1983) is a Japanese retired football player. He played for Japan national team.

== Club career ==
Nagata was born in Shizuoka on 6 April 1983. After graduating from Shizuoka Gakuen High School, he joined J1 League club Kashiwa Reysol in 2002. He debuted in September 2002 and became a regular center back in 2003. However he injured his anterior cruciate ligament in March 2005. Although he came back in November, Reysol was relegated to J2 League end of 2005 season. In 2006, Nagata moved to J1 club Albirex Niigata with teammate Kisho Yano. However Nagata could not play at all in the match for injuries in 2006. He became a regular player in 2007 and played many matches as center back with Mitsuru Chiyotanda (2007–2009) and Kazuhiko Chiba (2010). In 2011, Nagata moved to Urawa Reds with teammate Márcio Richardes. He became a regular center back from first season. However he could not play many matches for repeated injuries from 2013. In 2017, he moved to J2 club Tokyo Verdy. Although he played for the club in 2 seasons, he could hardly play in the match and resigned end of 2018 season. Nagata joined Tokyo United FC on 15 May 2019.

== National team career ==
Nagata was a participant at 2003 World Youth Championship in United Arab Emirates. He was called up to senior national team in 2004. He made his full international debut on 2 September 2010 in a friendly match against Guatemala. He was also selected in the national squad for the 2011 Asian Cup finals as a late replacement for injured Tomoaki Makino. He played 2 games for Japan until 2011.

== Club statistics ==
As of end of 2018 season

Club	Season	League		Emperor's Cup		J.League Cup		Other^{1}		Total	
Club	Season	Apps	Goals	Apps	Goals	Apps	Goals	Apps	Goals	Apps	Goals
Kashiwa Reysol	2002	6	0	0	0	0	0	-		6	0
Kashiwa Reysol	2003	23	0	1	0	4	0	-		28	0
Kashiwa Reysol	2004	28	2	1	0	4	0	2	0	35	2
Kashiwa Reysol	2005	5	1	0	0	1	0	2	0	8	1
Albirex Niigata	2006	0	0	0	0	0	0	-		0	0
Albirex Niigata	2007	22	0	0	0	3	0	-		25	0
Albirex Niigata	2008	30	1	2	0	5	0	-		37	1
Albirex Niigata	2009	33	0	4	0	6	0	-		43	0
Albirex Niigata	2010	34	0	2	0	6	0	-		42	0
Urawa Reds	2011	34	2	0	0	7	0	-		41	2
Urawa Reds	2012	29	0	2	0	5	1	-		36	1
Urawa Reds	2013	9	0	2	0	1	0	2	0	14	0
Urawa Reds	2014	13	0	2	0	5	0	-		20	0
Urawa Reds	2015	5	0	1	0	1	0	3	0	10	0
Urawa Reds	2016	1	0	0	0	0	0	3	0	4	0
Tokyo Verdy	2017	10	0	1	0	-		-		11	0
Tokyo Verdy	2018	0	0	3	0	-		-		3	0
Career total		282	6	21	0	48	1	12	0	363	7

^{1}Includes other competitive competitions, including the J. League promotion/relegation series.

== National team statistics ==
Japan national team
Year	Apps	Goals
2010	1	0
2011	1	0
Total	2	0

=== Appearances in major competitions ===
Team	Competition	Category	Appearances		Goals	Team record
Team	Competition	Category	Start	Sub	Goals	Team record
Japan	2002 AFC Youth Championship	U-19	6	0	0	Runners-up
Japan	2003 FIFA World Youth Championship	U-20	2	1	0	Quarter-finals
Japan	2011 AFC Asian Cup	Senior	0	1	0	Champions

== Honours ==
=== Japan ===
- AFC Asian Cup: 1

2011

=== Urawa Reds ===
- J.League Cup: 1

2016

=== Individual ===
- AFC U-19 Championship Best Eleven: 1

2002
