= Takaya Kurokawa =

Japanese footballer (born 1981)

Takaya Kurokawa 黒河 貴矢
Personal information
- Full name: Takaya Kurokawa
- Date of birth: April 7, 1981 (age 45)
- Place of birth: Saijo, Ehime, Japan
- Height: 1.84 m (6 ft 1/2 in)
- Position: Goalkeeper

Youth career
- 1997–1999: Ichiritsu Funabashi High School

Senior career*
Years	Team	Apps	(Gls)
2000–2005	Shimizu S-Pulse	53	(0)
2006	Tokyo Verdy	0	(0)
2006	JEF United Chiba	0	(0)
2007	Japan Soccer College	14	(0)
2008–2016	Albirex Niigata	33	(0)
Total		100	(0)
Medal record
Shimizu S-Pulse
Winner	Emperor's Cup	2001
Runner-up	Emperor's Cup	2000
Runner-up	Emperor's Cup	2005
JEF United Chiba
Winner	J.League Cup	2006
Representing Japan
Asian Games
Silver medal – second place	2002 Busan	Team
AFC U-19 Championship
Silver medal – second place	2000 Iran
- * Club domestic league appearances and goals

Takaya Kurokawa (黒河 貴矢, Kurokawa Takaya; born April 7, 1981) is a former Japanese football player.

== Club career ==
Kurokawa was born in Saijo on April 7, 1981. After graduating from high school, he joined Shimizu S-Pulse in 2000. He debuted in 2000 and his opportunity to play increased on behalf of veteran goalkeeper Masanori Sanada. However he did not play much, since Yohei Nishibe came to S-Pulse in 2004. Although he moved to Tokyo Verdy and JEF United Chiba in 2006, he did not play much. He moved to the Regional Leagues club Japan Soccer College in 2007. He played in many matches and moved to Albirex Niigata. However he did not play much there, as he was the team's reserve goalkeeper behind Takashi Kitano (2008-09), Masaaki Higashiguchi (2010-13), and Tatsuya Morita (2014-16). He retired at the end of the 2016 season.

== National team career ==
In June 2001, Kurokawa was selected Japan U-20 national team for 2001 World Youth Championship. But he did not play in the match, as he was the team's reserve goalkeeper behind Yosuke Fujigaya. In August 2004, he was selected Japan U-23 national team for 2004 Summer Olympics. But he did not play in the match, as he was the team's reserve goalkeeper behind Hitoshi Sogahata was selected as over aged.

== Club statistics ==
Club	Season	League		Emperor's Cup		J.League Cup		Total	
Club	Season	Apps	Goals	Apps	Goals	Apps	Goals	Apps	Goals
Shimizu S-Pulse	2000	1	0	0	0	1	0	2	0
Shimizu S-Pulse	2001	8	0	5	0	0	0	13	0
Shimizu S-Pulse	2002	11	0	0	0	2	0	13	0
Shimizu S-Pulse	2003	24	0	0	0	3	0	27	0
Shimizu S-Pulse	2004	4	0	1	0	0	0	5	0
Shimizu S-Pulse	2005	5	0	0	0	1	0	6	0
Tokyo Verdy	2006	0	0	0	0	-		0	0
JEF United Chiba	2006	0	0	0	0	0	0	0	0
Japan Soccer College	2007	14	0	2	0	-		16	0
Albirex Niigata	2008	0	0	0	0	0	0	0	0
Albirex Niigata	2009	0	0	0	0	1	0	1	0
Albirex Niigata	2010	11	0	1	0	1	0	13	0
Albirex Niigata	2011	0	0	0	0	0	0	0	0
Albirex Niigata	2012	7	0	0	0	1	0	8	0
Albirex Niigata	2013	13	0	1	0	3	0	17	0
Albirex Niigata	2014	0	0	0	0	0	0	0	0
Albirex Niigata	2015	2	0	2	0	0	0	4	0
Albirex Niigata	2016	0	0	0	0	0	0	0	0
Career total		100	0	12	0	13	0	125	0
