= Isao Homma =

Japanese footballer (born 1981)

Isao Homma 本間 勲
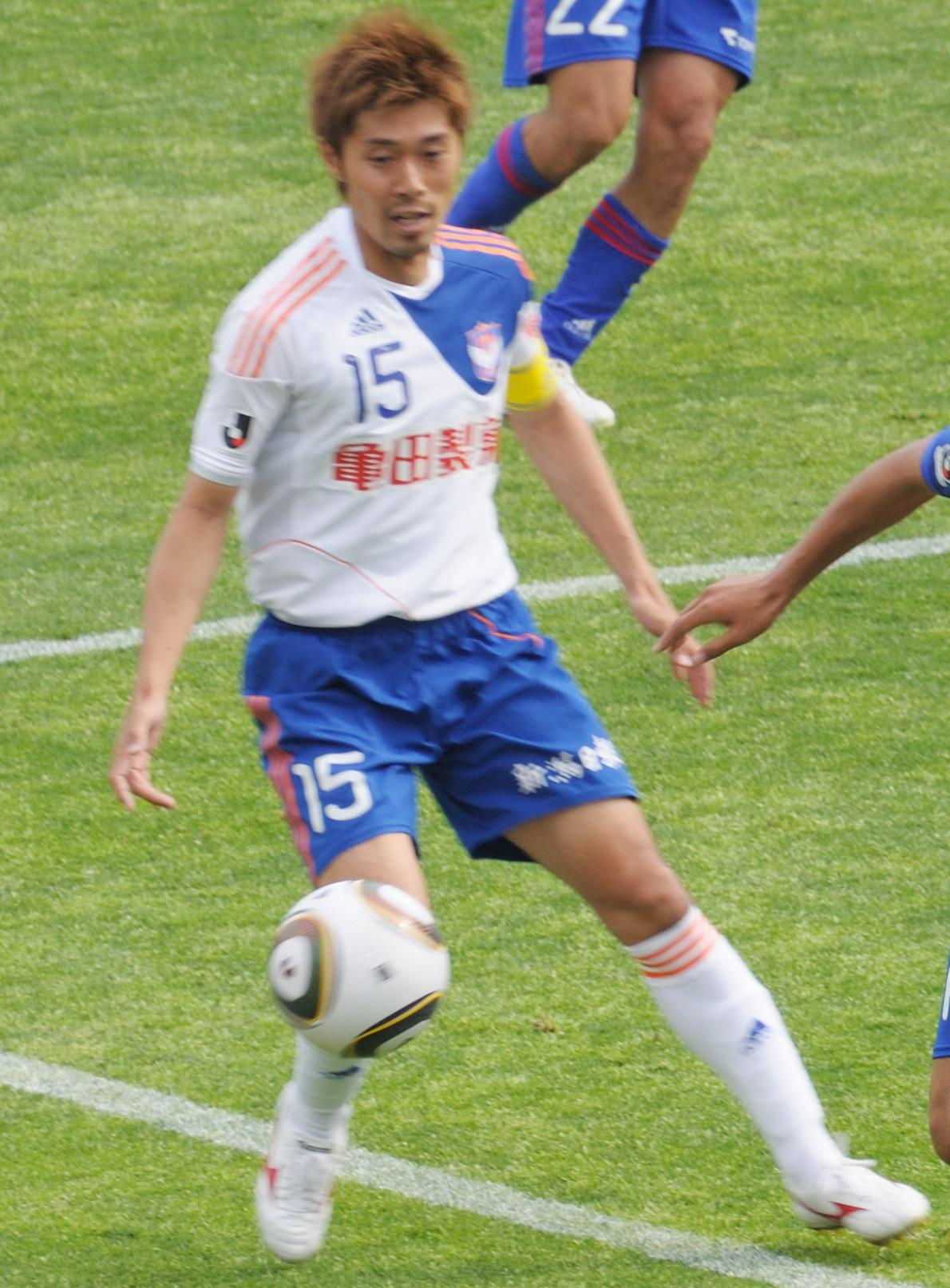
- Homma with Albirex Niigata in 2010

Personal information
- Full name: Isao Homma
- Date of birth: 19 April 1981 (age 45)
- Place of birth: Tainai, Niigata, Japan
- Height: 1.73 m (5 ft 8 in)
- Position: Midfielder

Youth career
- 1997–1999: Narashino High School

Senior career*
Years	Team	Apps	(Gls)
2000–2014	Albirex Niigata	312	(13)
2014–2016	Tochigi SC	76	(2)
2017	Albirex Niigata	5	(0)
Total		393	(15)
- * Club domestic league appearances and goals

Isao Homma (本間 勲, Homma Isao; born 19 April 1981) is a former Japanese football player.

== Playing career ==
Homma was born in Tainai on 19 April 1981. He began to play youth team football at the age of 8, with Nakajo Junior Soccer Club. In 1997, he entered Narashino High School in Chiba Prefecture and chose to play for the school. His school team won the prefectural tournament in 1998.

Homma began his professional career with Albirex Niigata in 2000. He made his professional debut on 5 May 2000, in a J2 League match against Mito HollyHock. Three days later, he scored his first professional goal in a 2–1 away victory over Shonan Bellmare. Homma finished his rookie campaign with 31 total appearances and three goals. However, he spent the next few years trying to break into the first team, spending most of his time as a substitute.

In the 2009 season, he was one of the most important players of Jun Suzuki's team. As the team usually deployed a 4–3–3 formation, he usually played as a central/defensive midfielder. He succeeded in retaining his place in the team, making 42 total appearances in the 2009 season.

At the start of the 2010 season Homma was selected as the new captain of Albirex Niigata. However, his opportunity to play decreased behind Léo Silva and Yuki Kobayashi in 2013 and he did not play at all in 2014.

In August 2014, he moved to the J2 club Tochigi SC. He played as a regular player as defensive midfielder. However the club finished in last place in 2015 and was relegated to the J3 League in 2016. In 2016, although he played as a regular player and the club won second place, the club lost in the promotion playoffs and was not promoted to J2. In 2017, he returned to Albirex Niigata. He retired at the end of the 2017 season.

== Club statistics ==
Club	season	League		Emperor's Cup		J.League Cup		Total	
Club	season	Apps	Goals	Apps	Goals	Apps	Goals	Apps	Goals
Albirex Niigata	2000	29	3	1	0	1	0	31	3
Albirex Niigata	2001	11	1	2	0	0	0	13	1
Albirex Niigata	2002	6	0	1	1	–		7	1
Albirex Niigata	2003	15	0	0	0	–		15	0
Albirex Niigata	2004	12	0	1	0	2	0	15	0
Albirex Niigata	2005	28	0	2	0	3	0	33	0
Albirex Niigata	2006	14	1	0	0	1	0	15	1
Albirex Niigata	2007	30	2	1	0	4	0	35	2
Albirex Niigata	2008	25	1	2	0	5	0	32	1
Albirex Niigata	2009	32	0	4	0	6	0	42	0
Albirex Niigata	2010	32	3	3	0	6	0	41	3
Albirex Niigata	2011	34	2	1	0	3	1	38	3
Albirex Niigata	2012	33	0	1	0	2	0	36	0
Albirex Niigata	2013	11	0	2	1	4	0	17	1
Albirex Niigata	2014	0	0	1	0	0	0	1	0
Tochigi SC	2014	13	0	0	0	–		13	0
Tochigi SC	2015	34	2	1	0	–		35	2
Tochigi SC	2016	29	0	–		–		29	0
Albirex Niigata	2017	5	0	1	0	6	0	12	0
Career total		393	15	24	2	43	1	460	18

== Honors ==
- J2 League (1): 2003
