= Atomu Tanaka =

Japanese footballer

Atomu Tanaka 田中 亜土夢
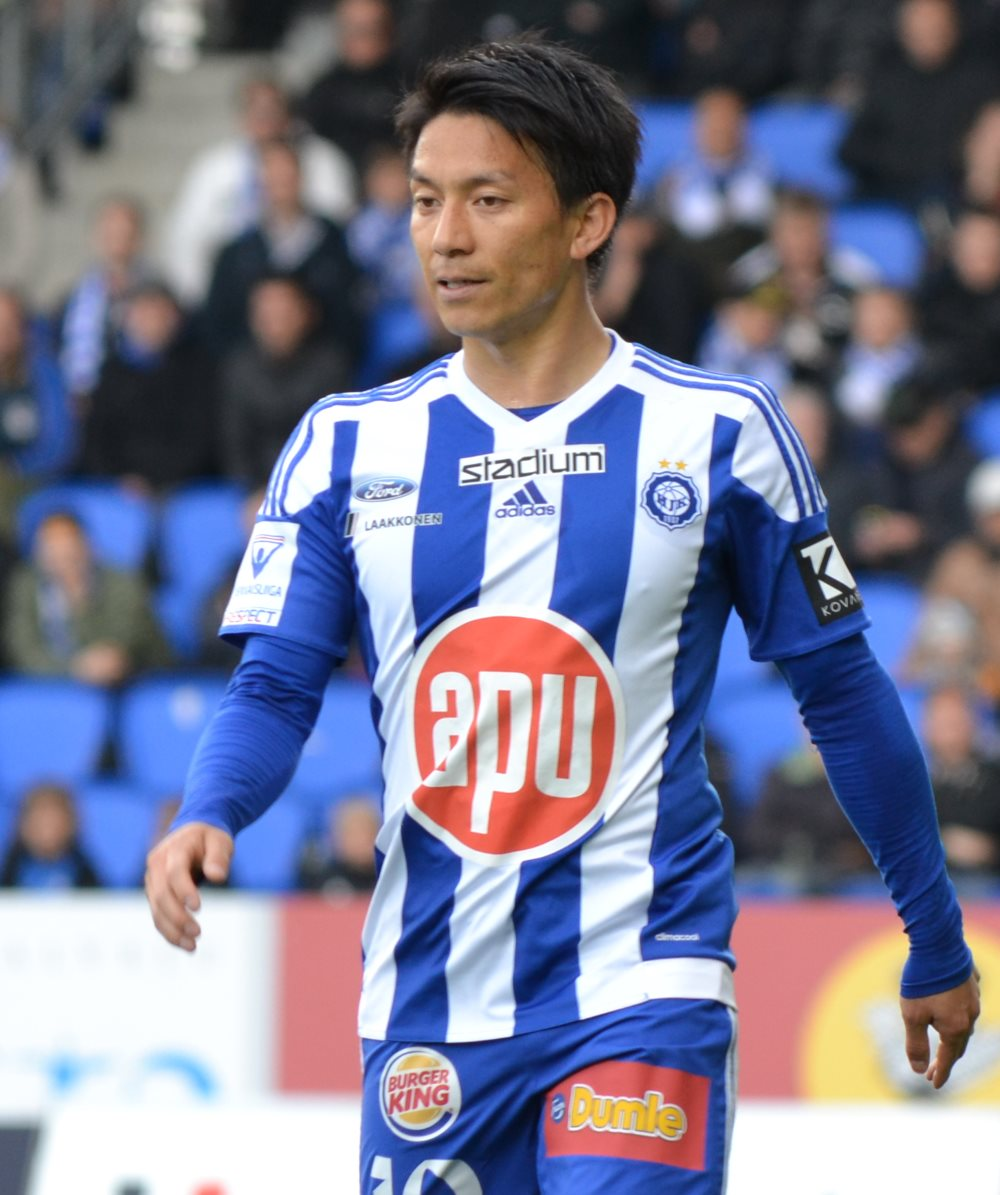
- Tanaka with HJK in 2017

Personal information
- Full name: Atomu Tanaka
- Date of birth: 4 October 1987 (age 39)
- Place of birth: Niigata, Japan
- Height: 1.67 m (5 ft 6 in)
- Position: Midfielder

Team information
- Current team: KTP
- Number: 37

Youth career
- 1996–1999: Shindori Eagles
- 2000–2002: Kido Junior High School
- 2003–2005: Maebashi Ikuei High School

Senior career*
Years	Team	Apps	(Gls)
2005–2014	Albirex Niigata	200	(17)
2015–2017	HJK	71	(16)
2018–2019	Cerezo Osaka	27	(2)
2018–2019	→ Cerezo Osaka U-23	3	(0)
2020–2024	HJK	80	(8)
2025–	KTP	42	(3)

International career
2006–2007	Japan U20	8	(1)
Medal record
Representing Japan
AFC U-19 Championship
Silver medal – second place	2006 India
- * Club domestic league appearances and goals as of 1 November 2026

Atomu Tanaka (田中 亜土夢, Tanaka Atomu; born 4 October 1987), nicknamed Atom, is a Japanese professional footballer who plays as a midfielder for Ykkösliiga club KTP.

He was a participant at 2007 FIFA U-20 World Cup in Canada and scored 1 goal in 3 appearances.

== Club career ==
=== Albirex Niigata ===
Tanaka was educated at and played for Maebashi Ikuei High School in Maebashi, Gunma. While he was a high school student, he was registered as a J.League specially-designated player by Albirex Niigata. It meant that he was eligible to play and train with Albirex Niigata, while he was still eligible to play for his high school football club. He played two league games for Albirex in the 2005 season. He made his debut on 27 November 2005 in a J1 League away match against Nagoya Grampus Eight.

After graduating from his high school in 2006, he officially signed with Albirex Niigata. His first appearance as a professional player came on 5 March 2006 in a league match against Kawasaki Frontale. His first professional goal came on 8 April 2006 in a league match against Ventforet Kofu.

=== HJK Helsinki ===
After scoring once in five matches for his new team HJK Helsinki in the 2015 Finnish League Cup, he scored on his Veikkausliiga debut against RoPS in a 3–1 away win on 12 April.

In October 2015 of the same year, HJK exercised their option of keeping Tanaka under contract for the 2016 season. Tanaka was voted as a best eleven member in 2015 and 2016 in the Finnish League.

On 25 October 2017, it was announced that Tanaka would leave HJK at the end of the 2017 season.

=== Cerezo Osaka ===
He is playing for Cerezo Osaka for the 2018 season.

=== Return to HJK ===
On 3 March 2020, Tanaka returned to Helsingin Jalkapalloklubi, after signing a contract until the end of July.

In the 2023 season Atom surpassed the 200th match mark in HJK. On 28 November 2023, Atom extended his contract with HJK, signing a new deal for the 2024 season, which will be his eight season with the club in total. In December 2024, it was announced that Tanaka would leave HJK after the 2024 season.

=== KTP ===
In January 2025, Tanaka signed with newly promoted Veikkausliiga club Kotkan Työväen Palloilijat (KTP).

== International career ==
Tanaka was a U-20 international and took part in the 2006 AFC Youth Championship and 2007 U-20 World Cup. He scored 1 goal in 8 appearances for this tournament.

== Personal life ==
Atom is a Finnish sauna enthusiast and he writes a sauna blog in Japanese. He has described Helsinki his second hometown.

== Career statistics ==
As of 26 July 2026

Appearances and goals by club, season and competition
Club	Season	League			National Cup		League Cup		Continental		Total	
Club	Season	Division	Apps	Goals	Apps	Goals	Apps	Goals	Apps	Goals	Apps	Goals
Albirex Niigata	2005	J1 League	2	0	0	0	0	0	–		2	0
Albirex Niigata	2006	J1 League	22	1	1	0	4	1	–		27	2
Albirex Niigata	2007	J1 League	11	1	0	0	2	0	–		13	1
Albirex Niigata	2008	J1 League	25	1	2	0	5	0	–		32	1
Albirex Niigata	2009	J1 League	5	0	2	0	3	0	–		10	0
Albirex Niigata	2010	J1 League	10	1	3	3	3	0	–		16	4
Albirex Niigata	2011	J1 League	25	3	1	0	2	1	–		28	4
Albirex Niigata	2012	J1 League	34	4	1	0	4	0	–		39	4
Albirex Niigata	2013	J1 League	33	4	2	1	6	0	–		41	5
Albirex Niigata	2014	J1 League	33	2	4	1	0	0	–		37	3
Albirex Niigata	Total		200	17	16	5	29	2	0	0	245	24
HJK Helsinki	2015	Veikkausliiga	31	8	3	2	5	1	6 (Note: Appearances at the UEFA Champions League and UEFA Europa League)	1	45	12
HJK Helsinki	2016	Veikkausliiga	17	5	2	1	5	2	4 (Note: Appearances at the UEFA Europa League)	2	28	10
HJK Helsinki	2017	Veikkausliiga	23	3	7	2	–		0	0	30	5
HJK Helsinki	Total		71	16	12	5	10	3	10	3	103	27
Cerezo Osaka	2018	J1 League	6	0	1	0	0	0	3	0	10	0
Cerezo Osaka	2019	J1 League	21	2	1	0	8	1	–		30	3
Cerezo Osaka	Total		27	2	2	0	8	1	3	0	40	3
Cerezo Osaka U-23	2018	J3 League	1	0	–		–		–		1	0
Cerezo Osaka U-23	2019	J3 League	2	0	–		–		–		2	0
Cerezo Osaka U-23	Total		3	0	0	0	0	0	0	0	3	0
HJK Helsinki	2020	Veikkausliiga	19	5	4	0	–		–		23	5
HJK Helsinki	2021	Veikkausliiga	16	1	5	1	–		7 (Note: Appearances at the UEFA Champions League and UEFA Europa Conference League)	1	28	3
HJK Helsinki	2022	Veikkausliiga	19	1	1	0	2	0	6	0	28	1
HJK Helsinki	2023	Veikkausliiga	18	1	1	0	5	2	8 (Note: Appearances at the UEFA Champions League, UEFA Europa League and UEFA Europa Conference League)	0	32	3
HJK Helsinki	2024	Veikkausliiga	8	0	2	0	2	0	5 (Note: Appearances in UEFA Conference League)	0	17	0
HJK Helsinki	Total		80	8	13	1	9	2	26	1	128	12
KTP	2025	Veikkausliiga	27	1	2	0	5	1	–		34	2
KTP	2026	Ykkösliiga	11	2	0	0	6	0	–		17	2
KTP	Total		38	3	2	0	11	1	0	0	51	4
Career total			419	46	45	11	67	9	39	4	554	70

== Honours ==
=== Club ===
HJK Helsinki

- Veikkausliiga: 2017, 2020, 2021, 2022, 2023
- Finnish Cup: 2017, 2020
- Finnish League Cup: 2023

=== Individual ===
- Veikkausliiga Team of the Year: 2016
