= Jun Uchida =

Japanese footballer

Jun Uchida 内田 潤
Personal information
- Full name: Jun Uchida
- Date of birth: October 14, 1977 (age 49)
- Place of birth: Amagasaki, Japan
- Height: 1.75 m (5 ft 9 in)
- Position: Defender

Youth career
- 1993–1995: Toin Gakuen High School
- 1996–1999: Komazawa University

Senior career*
Years	Team	Apps	(Gls)
2000–2006	Kashima Antlers	77	(1)
2006–2013	Albirex Niigata	144	(5)
Total		221	(6)
Medal record
Kashima Antlers
Winner	J1 League	2000
Winner	J1 League	2001
Winner	J.League Cup	2000
Winner	J.League Cup	2002
Runner-up	J.League Cup	2003
Runner-up	J.League Cup	2006
Winner	Emperor's Cup	2000
Runner-up	Emperor's Cup	2002
- * Club domestic league appearances and goals

Jun Uchida (内田 潤, Uchida Jun; born October 14, 1977) is a former Japanese football player.

== Playing career ==
Uchida was born in Amagasaki on October 14, 1977. After graduating from Komazawa University, he joined J1 League club Kashima Antlers in 2000. He got opportunity to play as right and left side back from first season and the club won the champions all three major title in Japan; J1 League, J.League Cup and Emperor's Cup. The club also won the champions 2001 J1 League for 2 years in a row. From summer 2002, he became a regular player as left side back and the club won the champions 2002 J.League Cup. Although his opportunity to play decreased in 2003, he played many matches in 2004 and 2005. However he could not become a regular player. In June 2006, he moved to Albirex Niigata. He became a regular player as right side back immediately. However his opportunity to play decreased behind new member Daigo Nishi in 2010 and he could not play many matches from 2011. He retired at the end of the 2013 season.

== Career statistics ==
Appearances and goals by club, season and competition
Club	Season	League			Emperor's Cup		J.League Cup		Total	
Club	Season	Division	Apps	Goals	Apps	Goals	Apps	Goals	Apps	Goals
Kashima Antlers	2000	J1 League	8	0	1	0	2	0	11	0
Kashima Antlers	2001	J1 League	9	0	1	0	0	0	10	0
Kashima Antlers	2002	J1 League	20	1	2	0	9	0	31	1
Kashima Antlers	2003	J1 League	6	0	4	0	3	0	13	0
Kashima Antlers	2004	J1 League	17	0	0	0	4	0	21	0
Kashima Antlers	2005	J1 League	17	0	1	0	5	0	23	0
Kashima Antlers	2006	J1 League	0	0	0	0	0	0	0	0
Albirex Niigata	2006	J1 League	14	1	2	0	0	0	16	1
Albirex Niigata	2007	J1 League	30	2	1	0	5	0	36	2
Albirex Niigata	2008	J1 League	33	2	2	1	6	0	41	3
Albirex Niigata	2009	J1 League	32	0	3	0	3	0	38	0
Albirex Niigata	2010	J1 League	18	0	3	0	4	0	25	0
Albirex Niigata	2011	J1 League	5	0	1	1	1	0	7	1
Albirex Niigata	2012	J1 League	5	0	0	0	1	0	6	0
Albirex Niigata	2013	J1 League	7	0	0	0	2	0	9	0
Career total			221	6	21	2	45	0	287	8
