= Kisho Yano =

Japanese footballer (born 1984)

Kisho Yano 矢野 貴章
Personal information
- Full name: Kisho Yano
- Date of birth: 5 April 1984 (age 42)
- Place of birth: Hamamatsu, Shizuoka, Japan
- Height: 1.87 m (6 ft 2 in)
- Positions: Forward; right-back

Team information
- Current team: Tochigi SC
- Number: 29

Youth career
- 2000–2002: Hamana High School

Senior career*
Years	Team	Apps	(Gls)
2003–2005	Kashiwa Reysol	39	(4)
2006–2010	Albirex Niigata	152	(30)
2010–2012	SC Freiburg	15	(0)
2012	Albirex Niigata	30	(2)
2013–2016	Nagoya Grampus	115	(8)
2017–2020	Albirex Niigata	94	(8)
2020–	Tochigi SC	210	(23)

International career
2001	Japan U-17	2	(1)
2002	Japan U-20	5	(2)
2007–2010	Japan	19	(2)
Medal record
Representing Japan
AFC U-19 Championship
Silver medal – second place	2002 Qatar
- * Club domestic league appearances and goals as of 17 August 2026

Kisho Yano (矢野 貴章, Yano Kishō; born 5 April 1984) is a Japanese professional footballer who plays as a forward or right-back for Tochigi SC.

== Club career ==
Yano was born in Hamamatsu, Shizuoka. He was chosen as one of the Designated Players for Development by J.League and JFA in 2002 when he was a student of Hamana High School. Because of this status, Yano was able to register as a Júbilo Iwata player while he was still eligible to play for his high school club. However, he did not play any official match for Iwata.

After graduating from his high school, he joined J1 League side Kashiwa Reysol. He played as substitute forward from first season. Although his opportunity to play increased late from summer 2005, Reysol was relegated to J2 League end of 2005 season.

In 2006, Yano was transferred to Albirex Niigata with teammate Mitsuru Nagata. He quickly established himself as a first-choice forward. Although his play style was a tall center forward, he was converted to right winger of three forwards in 2009 because Niigata gain same style forward Hideo Oshima.

In August 2010, Yano was transferred to Bundesliga club SC Freiburg. After an unsuccessful stint in Europe, he returned to Japan and signed for Niigata in February 2012. Although he initially played as regular forward, he lost his position and he played many matches as substitute forward from June. The club results were also sluggish and finished at the 15th place of 18 clubs in 2012 season.

In 2013, Yano moved to Nagoya Grampus. Although he initially played as center forward instead Joshua Kennedy who was injured, Kennedy came back in May and Yano played many matches as substitute forward. In 2014, Yano was converted to right side back by new manager Akira Nishino and became a regular player as right side back. Although he played as regular player every season, Nagoya finished at the 16th place of 18 clubs in 2016 season and was relegated to J2 League.

In 2017, Yano re-joined Albirex Niigata for the first time in four years. Although he played many matches as right side back, Niigata was relegated to J2 end of 2017 season. He was returned to his original position forward by new manager Masakazu Suzuki in 2018.

== International career ==
Yano represented Japan at several underage levels and was a member of the Japan U-17 team at the 2001 U-17 World Championship finals where he scored one goal.

He received his first cap for the Japan national team when he came on as a substitute on 24 March 2007 in a friendly against Peru. He was a member of the Japan team for the 2007 Asian Cup finals and played two games as a substitute. Yano's first international goal was an injury time winner against Switzerland on 11 September 2007 in a friendly played in Klagenfurt. In May 2010, he was selected for the 2010 World Cup. At the World Cup, he played once, coming on as a substitute against Cameroon. This match was his last out of 19 for Japan.

== Career statistics ==
=== Club ===
As of 4 February 2020

Appearances and goals by club, season and competition
Club	Season	League			National cup (Note: Includes Emperor's Cup and DFB-Pokal.)		League cup (Note: Includes J.League Cup.)		Other (Note: Includes J.League play-offs.)		Total	
Club	Season	Division	Apps	Goals	Apps	Goals	Apps	Goals	Apps	Goals	Apps	Goals
Kashiwa Reysol	2003	J1 League	18	2	0	0	2	0	–		20	2
Kashiwa Reysol	2004	J1 League	2	0	0	0	1	0	–		3	0
Kashiwa Reysol	2005	J1 League	19	2	2	0	1	0	2	0	24	2
Kashiwa Reysol	Total		39	4	2	0	4	0	2	0	47	4
Albirex Niigata	2006	J1 League	33	6	2	1	6	1	–		41	8
Albirex Niigata	2007	J1 League	33	7	1	0	6	1	–		40	8
Albirex Niigata	2008	J1 League	33	6	2	0	3	0	–		38	6
Albirex Niigata	2009	J1 League	33	8	4	5	1	0	–		38	13
Albirex Niigata	2010	J1 League	20	3	0	0	2	0	–		22	3
Albirex Niigata	Total		152	30	9	6	18	2	–		179	38
SC Freiburg	2010–11	Bundesliga	15	0	0	0	–		–		15	0
SC Freiburg	2011–12	Bundesliga	0	0	0	0	–		–		0	0
SC Freiburg	Total		15	0	0	0	–		–		15	0
Albirex Niigata	2012	J1 League	30	2	2	0	4	0	–		36	2
Nagoya Grampus	2013	J1 League	29	1	1	0	5	1	–		35	2
Nagoya Grampus	2014	J1 League	26	2	4	0	6	1	–		36	3
Nagoya Grampus	2015	J1 League	28	3	1	0	7	0	–		36	3
Nagoya Grampus	2016	J1 League	31	2	1	0	3	0	–		35	2
Nagoya Grampus	Total		114	8	7	0	21	2	–		142	10
Albirex Niigata	2017	J1 League	23	1	1	0	0	0	–		24	1
Albirex Niigata	2018	J2 League	39	5	0	0	2	1	–		41	6
Albirex Niigata	2019	J2 League	32	2	1	0			–		33	2
Albirex Niigata	Total		94	8	2	0	2	1	–		98	9
Tochigi SC	2020	J2 League	0	0	0	0			–		0	0
Career total			444	52	22	6	49	5	2	0	517	63

=== International ===
Appearances and goals by national team and year
National team	Year	Apps	Goals
Japan	2007	7	1
Japan	2008	5	0
Japan	2009	4	1
Japan	2010	3	0
Total		19	2

Scores and results list Japan's goal tally first, score column indicates score after each Yano goal.

List of international goals scored by Kisho Yano
No.	Date	Venue	Opponent	Score	Result	Competition
1	11 September 2007	Hypo-Arena, Klagenfurt, Switzerland	Switzerland	4–3	4–3	Friendly
2	31 May 2009	National Olympic Stadium, Tokyo, Japan	Belgium	4–0	4–0	2009 Kirin Cup

== Honours ==
Japan

- Kirin Cup: 2008, 2009
