= Toshihiro Matsushita =

Japanese footballer

Toshihiro Matsushita 松下 年宏
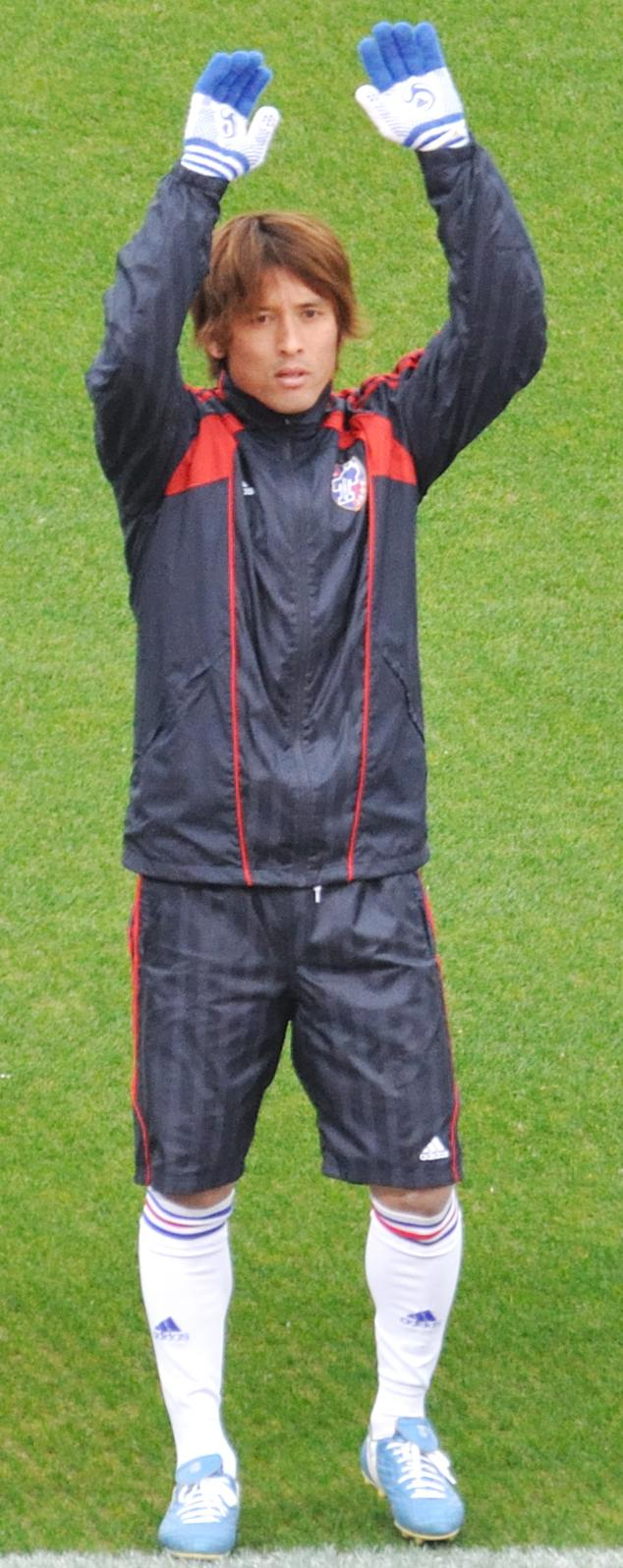

Personal information
- Full name: Toshihiro Matsushita
- Date of birth: 17 October 1983 (age 43)
- Place of birth: Kagoshima, Kagoshima, Japan
- Height: 1.74 m (5 ft 8 1/2 in)
- Position: Midfielder

Youth career
- 1999–2001: Kagoshima Jitsugyo High School

Senior career*
| Years | Team | Apps | (Gls) |
| 2002–2006 | Gamba Osaka | 29 | (0) |
| 2006–2009 | Albirex Niigata | 106 | (9) |
| 2010 | FC Tokyo | 21 | (1) |
| 2011–2013 | Vegalta Sendai | 78 | (5) |
| 2014–2016 | Yokohama FC | 74 | (9) |
| 2017–2018 | Kagoshima United FC | 15 | (1) |
| Total | | 323 | (25) |
Medal record
Gamba Osaka
| Winner | J1 League | 2005 |
| Runner-up | J.League Cup | 2005 |
| Runner-up | Emperor's Cup | 2006 |
Vegalta Sendai
| Runner-up | J1 League | 2012 |
- * Club domestic league appearances and goals

Toshihiro Matsushita (松下 年宏, Matsushita Toshihiro; born 17 October 1983) is a former Japanese football player.

== Playing career ==
Matsushita was born in Kagoshima on 17 October 1983. After graduating from high school, he joined J1 League club Gamba Osaka in 2002. He debuted in first season and played several matches as right side midfielder every season. In 2005, he played many matches as substitute. However he could hardly play in the match behind new player Akira Kaji in 2006. In June 2006, he moved to Albirex Niigata. He played many matches as substitute midfielder until 2007. In 2008, he became a regular player as offensive midfielder. In 2010, he moved to FC Tokyo. However his opportunity to play decreased from summer.

In 2011, he moved to Vegalta Sendai. He played many matches offensive midfielder and defensive midfielder. Vegalta finished at the 4th place in 2011 season which is best results in the club history. In addition, Vegalta won the 2nd place in 2012 season. In 2014, he moved to J2 League club Yokohama FC. He played many matches as right midfielder. However his opportunity to play decreased in 2016. In 2017, he moved to his local club Kagoshima United FC in J3 League. He played in 2 seasons and retired end of 2018 season.

== Club statistics ==
Updated to 1 January 2019.

| Club performance | | | League | | Cup | | League Cup | | Continental | | Total | |
| Season | Club | League | Apps | Goals | Apps | Goals | Apps | Goals | Apps | Goals | Apps | Goals |
| Japan | | | League | | Emperor's Cup | | J.League Cup | | AFC | | Total | |
|---|---|---|---|---|---|---|---|---|---|---|---|---|
| 2002 | Gamba Osaka | J1 League | 5 | 0 | 0 | 0 | 1 | 0 | - | | 6 | 0 |
| 2003 | Gamba Osaka | J1 League | 5 | 0 | 0 | 0 | 1 | 0 | - | | 6 | 0 |
| 2004 | Gamba Osaka | J1 League | 4 | 0 | 2 | 0 | 1 | 0 | - | | 7 | 0 |
| 2005 | Gamba Osaka | J1 League | 14 | 0 | 3 | 0 | 7 | 0 | - | | 24 | 0 |
| 2006 | Gamba Osaka | J1 League | 1 | 0 | 0 | 0 | 0 | 0 | - | | 1 | 0 |
| Total | | | 29 | 0 | 5 | 0 | 10 | 0 | - | | 44 | 0 |
| 2006 | Albirex Niigata | J1 League | 19 | 3 | 2 | 0 | 0 | 0 | - | | 21 | 3 |
| 2007 | Albirex Niigata | J1 League | 25 | 0 | 0 | 0 | 4 | 0 | - | | 29 | 0 |
| 2008 | Albirex Niigata | J1 League | 28 | 2 | 0 | 0 | 5 | 0 | - | | 33 | 2 |
| 2009 | Albirex Niigata | J1 League | 34 | 4 | 3 | 1 | 6 | 2 | - | | 43 | 7 |
| Total | | | 106 | 9 | 5 | 1 | 15 | 2 | - | | 126 | 12 |
| 2010 | FC Tokyo | J1 League | 21 | 1 | 3 | 1 | 4 | 0 | - | | 28 | 2 |
| Total | | | 21 | 1 | 3 | 1 | 4 | 0 | - | | 28 | 2 |
| 2011 | Vegalta Sendai | J1 League | 26 | 2 | 3 | 0 | 4 | 0 | - | | 33 | 2 |
| 2012 | Vegalta Sendai | J1 League | 26 | 1 | 2 | 0 | 7 | 1 | - | | 35 | 2 |
| 2013 | Vegalta Sendai | J1 League | 26 | 2 | 3 | 1 | 2 | 1 | 2 | 0 | 33 | 4 |
| Total | | | 78 | 5 | 7 | 1 | 13 | 2 | 2 | 0 | 100 | 8 |
| 2014 | Yokohama FC | J2 League | 29 | 5 | 1 | 0 | - | | - | | 30 | 5 |
| 2015 | Yokohama FC | J2 League | 35 | 4 | 2 | 1 | - | | - | | 37 | 5 |
| 2016 | Yokohama FC | J2 League | 10 | 0 | 2 | 1 | - | | - | | 12 | 5 |
| Total | | | 74 | 9 | 5 | 2 | - | | - | | 79 | 11 |
| 2017 | Kagoshima United FC | J3 League | 14 | 1 | 2 | 0 | - | | - | | 16 | 1 |
| 2018 | Kagoshima United FC | J3 League | 1 | 0 | 1 | 0 | - | | - | | 2 | 0 |
| Total | | | 15 | 1 | 3 | 0 | - | | - | | 18 | 1 |
| Career total | | | 323 | 25 | 29 | 5 | 42 | 4 | 2 | 0 | 396 | 34 |
