= Naoto Matsuo =

Japanese footballer

Naoto Matsuo 松尾 直人
Personal information
- Date of birth: September 10, 1979 (age 47)
- Place of birth: Wakayama, Japan
- Height: 1.81 m (5 ft 11 1/2 in)
- Position: Defender

Youth career
- 1995–1997: Kindai University Wakayama High School

Senior career*
Years	Team	Apps	(Gls)
1998–2005	Vissel Kobe	71	(3)
1999	→Gimnasia y Esgrima Jujuy (loan)		
2002	→Cerezo Osaka (loan)	0	(0)
2004	→Albirex Niigata (loan)	11	(1)
2006	FC Tokyo	0	(0)
2007–2009	Albirex Niigata	63	(2)
2010–2011	Shonan Bellmare	4	(0)
2012–2013	FC Osaka	19	(3)
Total		168	(9)
- * Club domestic league appearances and goals

Naoto Matsuo (松尾 直人, Matsuo Naoto; born September 10, 1979) is a former Japanese football player.

== Playing career ==
Matsuo was born in Wakayama on September 10, 1979. After graduating from high school, he joined J1 League club Vissel Kobe in 1998. He played many matches as a substitute midfielder in the first season. In 1999, he moved to the Argentine club Gimnasia y Esgrima Jujuy on loan. In April 1999, he returned to Vissel Kobe. However, he could hardly play in the match until 2000. In 2001, he played many matches as mainly left side back. In 2002, he moved to J2 League club Cerezo Osaka on loan. However, he could not play at all in the match. In July 2002, he returned to Vissel Kobe. However, he could hardly play in the match. In August 2004, he moved to newly was promoted to J1 League club, Albirex Niigata on loan. He played many matches as left-back of three backs defense. In 2005, he returned to Vissel Kobe. Although he played many matches as left-back of three backs defense, he could not play at all in the match in late 2005. In 2006, he moved to FC Tokyo. However, he could not play at all in the match for injury. In 2007, he moved to Albirex Niigata. He played as regular left side back. However his opportunity to play decreased in 2009. In 2010, he moved to Shonan Bellmare. However, he could hardly play in the match due to injury. In 2012, he moved to Regional Leagues club FC Osaka. He retired at the end of the 2013 season.

== Career statistics ==
Appearances and goals by club, season and competition
Club	Season	League			Emperor's Cup		J.League Cup		Total	
Club	Season	Division	Apps	Goals	Apps	Goals	Apps	Goals	Apps	Goals
Vissel Kobe	1998	J1 League	16	0	0	0	2	1	18	1
Vissel Kobe	1999	J1 League	0	0	0	0	0	0	0	0
Vissel Kobe	2000	J1 League	4	0	4	1	2	0	10	1
Vissel Kobe	2001	J1 League	25	2	1	0	3	0	29	2
Cerezo Osaka	2002	J2 League	0	0	0	0	–		0	0
Vissel Kobe	2002	J1 League	0	0	0	0	0	0	0	0
Vissel Kobe	2003	J1 League	12	0	3	0	3	0	18	0
Vissel Kobe	2004	J1 League	2	0	0	0	0	0	2	0
Albirex Niigata	2004	J1 League	11	1	1	0	2	0	14	1
Vissel Kobe	2005	J1 League	12	1	0	0	5	0	17	0
FC Tokyo	2006	J1 League	0	0	0	0	0	0	0	0
Albirex Niigata	2007	J1 League	20	0	0	0	2	0	22	0
Albirex Niigata	2008	J1 League	30	1	0	0	6	0	36	1
Albirex Niigata	2009	J1 League	13	1	2	0	5	0	20	1
Shonan Bellmare	2010	J1 League	0	0	0	0	0	0	0	0
Shonan Bellmare	2011	J2 League	4	0	2	0	–		6	0
FC Osaka	2012	Regional Leagues	13	3	–		–		13	3
FC Osaka	2013	Regional Leagues	6	0	–		–		6	0
Career total			168	9	13	1	30	1	211	11
