= Keiji Kaimoto =

Japanese footballer

Keiji Kaimoto 海本 慶治
Personal information
- Full name: Keiji Kaimoto
- Date of birth: November 26, 1972 (age 53)
- Place of birth: Suita, Osaka, Japan
- Height: 1.81 m (5 ft 11 1/2 in)
- Position: Defender

Youth career
- 1988–1990: Tokai University Gyosei High School
- 1991–1994: Tokai University

Senior career*
Years	Team	Apps	(Gls)
1995–2000	Vissel Kobe	104	(6)
2001–2004	Nagoya Grampus Eight	49	(0)
2005–2008	Albirex Niigata	60	(2)
Total		213	(8)

International career
2000	Japan	1	(0)
Medal record
Representing Japan
AFC Asian Cup
Gold medal – first place	2000 Lebanon
- * Club domestic league appearances and goals

Keiji Kaimoto (海本 慶治, Kaimoto Keiji; born November 26, 1972) is a former Japanese football player. He played for Japan national team. His younger brother Kojiro Kaimoto is also a former footballer.

== Club career ==
Kaimoto was born in Suita on November 26, 1972. After graduating from Tokai University, he joined the Japan Football League club Vissel Kobe in 1995. The club won second place in 1996 and was promoted to the J1 League. He played often in 1997. In 2001, he moved to Nagoya Grampus Eight. In 2003, his younger brother Kojiro Kaimoto also joined Grampus. However his playing time gradually decreased. He moved to Albirex Niigata with Kojiro in 2005. Although he played often, Kojiro left the club in May 2006. His did not play as much in 2007 and retired at the end of the 2008 season.

== National team career ==
Kaimoto was selected once to play for the Japan national team. He played a 2000 Asian Cup match against Qatar at the group stage in Beirut on October 20, 2000. He was relieved in the 39th minute of the match. The team went on to win the tournament.

== Career statistics ==
=== Club ===
Appearances and goals by club, season and competition
Club	Season	League			Emperor's Cup		J.League Cup		Total	
Club	Season	Division	Apps	Goals	Apps	Goals	Apps	Goals	Apps	Goals
Vissel Kobe	1995	Football League	2	0	0	0	-		2	0
Vissel Kobe	1996	Football League	0	0	0	0	-		0	0
Vissel Kobe	1997	J1 League	20	0	2	1	0	0	22	1
Vissel Kobe	1998	J1 League	32	4	1	0	3	0	36	4
Vissel Kobe	1999	J1 League	28	1	0	0	2	0	30	1
Vissel Kobe	2000	J1 League	22	1	4	0	1	0	27	1
Nagoya Grampus Eight	2001	J1 League	21	0	1	0	5	0	27	0
Nagoya Grampus Eight	2002	J1 League	12	0	0	0	5	1	17	1
Nagoya Grampus Eight	2003	J1 League	7	0	0	0	2	0	9	0
Nagoya Grampus Eight	2004	J1 League	9	0	1	0	3	0	13	0
Albirex Niigata	2005	J1 League	20	1	1	0	6	0	27	1
Albirex Niigata	2006	J1 League	31	1	1	0	4	0	36	1
Albirex Niigata	2007	J1 League	0	0	0	0	0	0	0	0
Albirex Niigata	2008	J1 League	9	0	0	0	0	0	9	0
Career total			213	8	11	1	31	1	255	10

=== International ===
Japan national team
Year	Apps	Goals
2000	1	0
Total	1	0

== National team ==
- 2000 Asian Cup (Champions)

== Honors and awards ==
=== Team honors ===
- AFC Asian Cup Champions: 2000
