= Jun Marques Davidson =

Japanese footballer

Jun Marques Davidson ディビッドソン 純 マーカス
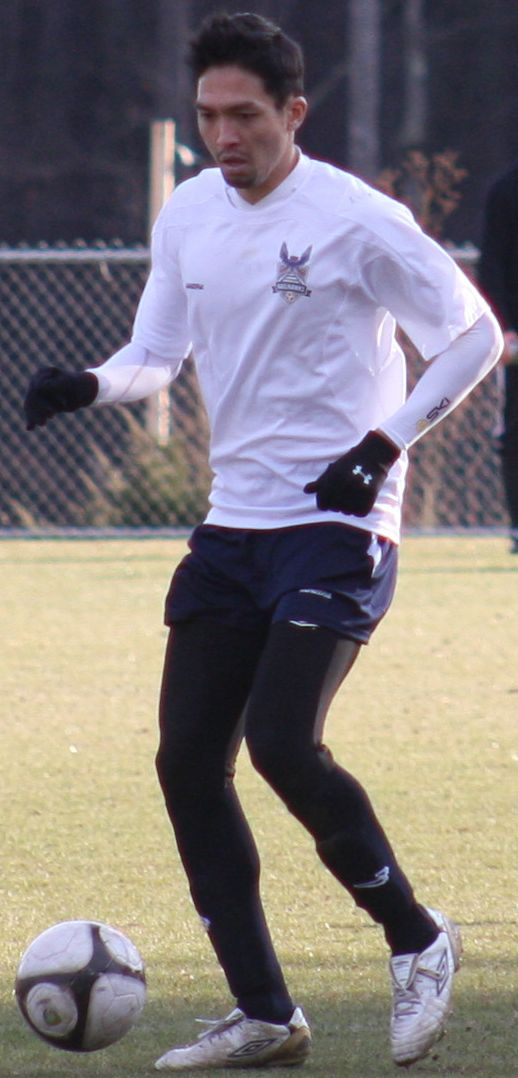

Personal information
- Full name: Jun Marques Davidson
- Date of birth: June 7, 1983 (age 43)
- Place of birth: Tokyo, Japan
- Height: 1.86 m (6 ft 1 in)
- Position: Midfielder

Team information
- Current team: Selangor (assistant coach)

Youth career
- 1996–1998: Tokyo Gas FC
- 1998–1999: TASIS England
- 1999–2001: American Global Soccer School

Senior career*
Years	Team	Apps	(Gls)
2002–2006	Omiya Ardija	74	(1)
2007–2009	Albirex Niigata	8	(0)
2007	→ Vissel Kobe (loan)	10	(0)
2008	→ Consadole Sapporo (loan)	17	(0)
2010	Carolina RailHawks	23	(1)
2011	Tokushima Vortis	24	(0)
2012–2013	Vancouver Whitecaps	50	(0)
2014	Carolina RailHawks	25	(0)
2015	Navy	32	(1)
2016–2017	Charlotte Independence	54	(2)
Total		317	(5)

Managerial career
- 2017–2019: Omiya Ardija (youth)
- 2019: Guangzhou R&F (youth)
- 2020: Shijiazhuang Ever Bright (assistant)
- 2024: Shaanxi Union
- 2024: Kagoshima United (youth)
- 2024–: Selangor (assistant)
- * Club domestic league appearances and goals

Jun Marques Davidson (ディビッドソン 純 マーカス, Davidson Jun Marques; born June 7, 1983) is a Japanese former footballer who is currently the assistant coach of Malaysia Super League club Selangor.

== Playing career ==
=== Youth ===
Davidson was born and raised in Tokyo to a Japanese mother and an American father. He moved with his family to Pasadena, California in 1995, where he attended high school and played for the American Global Soccer School.

=== Japanese club ===
Davidson returned to Japan in 2002, and made his professional debut with Omiya Ardija at the age of 19. After three seasons in the J2 League, he helped the team win promotion to the J1 League in 2004. Davidson remained with Omiya Ardija until 2006, finishing his career at the club with 87 appearances and 2 goal in all competitions.

Davidson transferred to Albirex Niigata in 2007, but never settled at the club, and spending time on loan at Vissel Kobe and Consadole Sapporo. He returned Niigata in 2009.

Davidson returned to the United States in 2010 when he signed for Carolina RailHawks of the USSF Division 2 Professional League. He helped the Railhawks in winning the NASL Conference title and earning a trip to the USSF D-2 championship series.

Davidson spent the 2011 season with Tokushima Vortis of Japan's J2 League. He remained at the club for one season and appeared in 24 league matches helping the club to a fourth-place finish in, three points out of promotion. Davidson signed with Vancouver Whitecaps of Major League Soccer on 1 January 2012, reuniting with former coach Martin Rennie. He made his debut on March 10, 2012 against the Montreal Impact and played two seasons for Whitecaps. Davidson signed for the Carolina RailHawks in March 2014 and was named captain for the 2014 season. He collected the team MVP award after leading the club to a fifth-place finish in the North American Soccer League.

From 2015, Davidson played for Thai Premier League club Navy in 2015 and United Soccer League club Charlotte Independence (2016–2017). He retired from his playing career at the end of the 2017 season.

== Managerial career ==
After retiring in 2017, Davidson focused into coaching, starting with his boyhood club, Omiya Ardija where he worked with the youth teams. In 2019, he moved to China to joined Guangzhou R&F as the club youth academy coach. In 2020, Davidson was appointed as the assistant coach at Shijiazhuang Ever Bright working under Iranian head coach Afshin Ghotbi.

In early 2024, Davidson was appointed as Shaanxi Union club director. In mid June, he returned home to joined J2 League club Kagoshima United as the club youth academy coach.

On 30 November 2024, Davidson was announced as the assistant coach of Malaysia Super League club Selangor where he will work under compatriot Katsuhito Kinoshi.

== Club statistics ==
Club performance			League		Cup		League Cup		Total	
Season	Club	League	Apps	Goals	Apps	Goals	Apps	Goals	Apps	Goals
2002	Omiya Ardija	J2 League	0	0	0	0	-		0	0
2003	Omiya Ardija	J2 League	7	0	0	0	-		7	0
2004	Omiya Ardija	J2 League	17	1	1	1	-		18	2
2005	Omiya Ardija	J1 League	30	0	4	0	8	0	42	0
2006	Omiya Ardija	J1 League	20	0	0	0	0	0	20	0
Total			74	1	5	1	8	0	87	2
2007	Albirex Niigata	J1 League	0	0	0	0	0	0	0	0
Total			0	0	0	0	0	0	0	0
2007	Vissel Kobe	J1 League	10	0	1	0	0	0	11	0
Total			10	0	1	0	0	0	11	0
2008	Consadole Sapporo	J1 League	17	0	1	0	2	0	20	0
Total			17	0	1	0	2	0	20	0
2009	Albirex Niigata	J1 League	8	0	0	0	2	0	10	0
Total			8	0	0	0	2	0	10	0
2010	Carolina RailHawks	USSF D2 Pro League	23	1	-		3	0	26	1
Total			23	1	-		3	0	26	1
2011	Tokushima Vortis	J2 League	24	0	1	0	-		25	0
Total			24	0	1	0	-		25	0
2012	Vancouver Whitecaps	Major League Soccer	24	0	2	0	0	0	26	0
2013	Vancouver Whitecaps	Major League Soccer	26	0	2	0	-		28	0
Total			50	0	4	0	0	0	54	0
2014	Carolina RailHawks	North American Soccer League	25	0	4	1	-		29	1
Total			25	0	4	1	-		29	1
2015	Navy	Thai Premier League	32	1	0	0	0	0	32	1
Total			32	1	0	0	0	0	32	1
2016	Charlotte Independence	United Soccer League	30	2	1	0	-		31	2
2017	Charlotte Independence	United Soccer League	24	0	1	0	-		25	0
Total			54	2	2	0	-		56	2
Career total			317	5	18	2	15	0	350	7
