= Gilton =

Brazilian footballer (born 1989)

Personal information
- Full name: Gilton Ribeiro
- Date of birth: March 25, 1989 (age 37)
- Place of birth: Campo Grande, Brazil
- Height: 1.84 m (6 ft 0 in)
- Position: Left back

Youth career
- 2007: Cruzeiro

Senior career*
Years	Team	Apps	(Gls)
2008	Porto Alegre		
2008	Juventus-SP		
2008–2012	Joinville		
2008	→ Cerezo Osaka (loan)	8	(1)
2009	→ Albirex Niigata (loan)	25	(2)
2010	→ Kashima Antlers (loan)	25	(1)
2012	→ Chapecoense (loan)	9	(0)
2013	Paraná	17	(0)
2013	Paysandu	10	(0)
2014	Brusque	15	(2)
2014	Cuiabá	3	(0)
2016	Ventforet Kofu	0	(0)
2016–2017	Guarani	26	(0)
- * Club domestic league appearances and goals as of 21 January 2018

Gilton Ribeiro or simply Gilton (born March 25, 1989) is a Brazilian football defender who last played for Guarani.

== Club statistics ==
Club performance			League		Cup		League Cup		Continental		Total	
Season	Club	League	Apps	Goals	Apps	Goals	Apps	Goals	Apps	Goals	Apps	Goals
Japan			League		Emperor's Cup		J.League Cup		Asia		Total	
2008	Cerezo Osaka	J2 League	8	1	2	1	-		-		10	2
2009	Albirex Niigata	J1 League	25	2	3	0	4	1	-		32	3
2010	Kashima Antlers	J1 League	25	1	3	0	2	0	4	0	34	1
Country	Japan		58	4	8	1	6	1	4	0	76	6
Total			58	4	8	1	6	1	4	0	76	6
