= Fumiya Kogure =

Japanese footballer

Personal information
- Full name: Fumiya Kogure
- Date of birth: June 28, 1989 (age 37)
- Place of birth: Tokyo, Japan
- Height: 1.77 m (5 ft 10 in)
- Position: Midfielder

Senior career*
Years	Team	Apps	(Gls)
2008–2012	Albirex Niigata	45	(3)
2013	Mito HollyHock	15	(0)
2014	Azul Claro Numazu	21	(3)
2015	Albirex Niigata (S)	25	(3)
2016–2017	Hougang United	40	(11)
2018	Geylang International	21	(1)
2019–2020	Soltilo Angkor	36	(10)
2021–2022	Nagaworld	34	(7)
Total		124	(10)
- * Club domestic league appearances and goals as of July 30, 2016

Fumiya Kogure (木暮 郁哉, Kogure Fumiya; born June 28, 1989) is a Japanese football player. He currently plays for Nagaworld in the Cambodian League. Kogure had played previously for several clubs in Japan, including Albirex Niigata, Mito HollyHock and Azul Claro Numazu. He plays primarily as a holding central midfielder, but can also be deployed as a winger or attacking midfielder when required.

== Club career ==
=== Albirex Niigata Singapore ===
On 22 December 2014, it was formally announced by J1 League side Albirex Niigata via their satellite club in Singapore that Kogure has signed for the S.League side. On 30 November 2015, Kogure was named the S.League Player of the Year for the 2015 S.League season, after scoring a total of 5 goals and 13 assists in all competitions. Kogure was also part of the Albirex Niigata (S) squad that won both the 2015 Singapore Cup and the 2015 Singapore League Cup.

=== Hougang United ===
Kogure's impressive form in his debut season generated interest from S.League club Hougang United. On 31 January 2016, Kogure officially transferred to Hougang United for the 2016 S.League season. Kogure scored his first goal for the club on 14 April 2016, a decisive goal in a 1-0 win over Warriors FC in a S.League fixture.

== International career ==
Kogure has represented the Japan U19 in the 2008 AFC U-19 Championship, making a total of 2 appearances in the tournament.

== Club statistics ==
Statistics accurate as of 23 Nov 2020

Japan
Club	Season	League			Emperor's Cup		J.League Cup		Total	
Club	Season	Division	Apps	Goals	Apps	Goals	Apps	Goals	Apps	Goals
Albirex Niigata	2008	J1 League	12	0	2	0	1	0	15	0
Albirex Niigata	2009	J1 League	3	0	1	0	4	0	8	0
Albirex Niigata	2010	J1 League	7	0	1	0	4	0	12	0
Albirex Niigata	2011	J1 League	19	0	0	0	1	1	20	1
Albirex Niigata	2012	J1 League	4	0	3	1	0	0	7	1
Albirex Niigata	Total		45	0	13	1	4	1	62	2
Mito Hollyhock	2013	J2 League	15	0	-		1	0	16	0
Mito Hollyhock	Total		15	0	0	0	1	0	16	0
Azul Claro Numazu	2014	Football League	21	3	-		-		21	3
Azul Claro Numazu	Total		21	3	0	0	0	0	21	3
Singapore
Club	Season	League			Singapore Cup		Singapore League Cup		Total	
Club	Season	Division	Apps	Goals	Apps	Goals	Apps	Goals	Apps	Goals
Albirex Niigata (S)	2015	S.League	22	3	6	0	4	2	32	5
Albirex Niigata (S)	Total		22	3	6	0	4	2	32	5
Hougang United	2016	S.League	13	2	1	1	4	3	18	6
Hougang United	2017	S.League	19	7	5	2	3	0	27	9
Hougang United	Total		32	9	6	3	7	3	45	15
Geylang International	2018	Singapore Premier League	21	1	0	0	0	0	21	1
Geylang International	Total		21	1	0	0	0	0	21	1
Cambodia
Soltilo Angkor	2019	Cambodian League	17	6	0	0	0	0	17	6
Soltilo Angkor	2020	Cambodian League	15	4	0	0	0	0	15	4
Soltilo Angkor	Total		32	10	0	0	0	0	32	10
Nagaworld	2021	Cambodian League	0	0	0	0	0	0	0	0
Nagaworld	Total		0	0	0	0	0	0	0	0
Career total			156	16	25	4	16	6	197	26

== Honours ==
=== Club ===
Albirex Niigata (S)

- Singapore Cup (1): 2015
- Singapore League Cup (1): 2015

=== Individual ===
- S.League Player of the Year: 2015
