= Kazuya Myodo =

Japanese footballer

Personal information
- Full name: Kazuya Myodo
- Date of birth: April 4, 1986 (age 40)
- Place of birth: Toyama, Japan
- Height: 1.71 m (5 ft 7 1/2 in)
- Position: Midfielder

Senior career*
Years	Team	Apps	(Gls)
2005	Japan Soccer College	12	(3)
2006	Albirex Niigata Singapore		
2007–2008	Japan Soccer College	25	(9)
2009–2010	Albirex Niigata	6	(0)
2011	Pattaya United		
2012	Kataller Toyama	4	(1)
Total		47	(13)
- * Club domestic league appearances and goals

Kazuya Myodo (明堂 和也, Myodo Kazuya; born April 4, 1986) is a former Japanese football player.
