= Ayato Hasebe =

Japanese footballer

Personal information
- Full name: Ayato Hasebe
- Date of birth: February 6, 1990 (age 36)
- Place of birth: Niigata, Niigata, Japan
- Height: 1.72 m (5 ft 7 1/2 in)
- Position: Defender

Youth career
- 2005–2007: Albirex Niigata

Senior career*
Years	Team	Apps	(Gls)
2008–2011	Albirex Niigata	2	(0)
2009	→Japan Soccer College (loan)	12	(0)
2010	→Zweigen Kanazawa (loan)	29	(2)
2012–2013	FC Ganju Iwate	31	(12)
Total		74	(14)
- * Club domestic league appearances and goals

Ayato Hasebe (長谷部 彩翔, Hasebe Ayato; born February 6, 1990) is a Japanese former football player. Hasabe made two appearances in the J1 League for Albirex Niigata.

== Career ==
Hasebe was born near Niigata and joined local side Albirex Niigata as a trainee from school. Hasebe is a graduate of the Albirex youth academy and signed his first professional contract in the winter of 2008. He made his first team debut on 3 May 2008 in the J1 League match against Oita Trinita, coming on as a second-half substitute for Fumiya Kogure in the 45th minute. During the 2009 season, Hasebe was loaned out to Regional Leagues side Japan Soccer College, and later Japan Football League side Zweigen Kanazawa. In total Hasebe made 41 appearances for these clubs.

== Club statistics ==
season	Club	League	League		Emperor's Cup		J.League Cup		Total	
season	Club	League	Apps	Goals	Apps	Goals	Apps	Goals	Apps	Goals
2008	Albirex Niigata	J1 League	1	0	0	0	1	0	2	0
2009	Japan Soccer College	Regional Leagues	12	0	2	0	–		14	0
2010	Zweigen Kanazawa	Football League	29	2	2	0	–		31	2
2011	Albirex Niigata	J1 League	1	0	0	0	0	0	1	0
2012	FC Ganju Iwate	Regional Leagues	14	4	–		–		14	4
Career total			57	6	4	0	1	0	62	6
