= Cho Young-cheol =

South Korean footballer

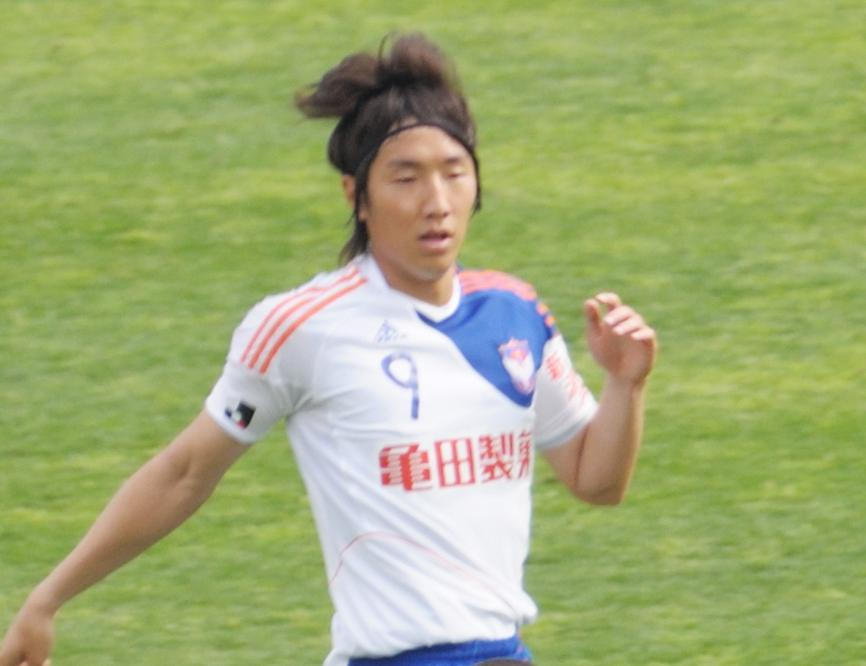

Personal information
- Full name: Cho Young-cheol
- Date of birth: 31 May 1989 (age 37)
- Place of birth: Ulsan, South Korea
- Height: 1.80 m (5 ft 11 in)
- Position: Winger

Youth career
- 2005–2007: Haksung High School
- 2005–2006: → FC Metz (KFA Youth Project)

Senior career*
Years	Team	Apps	(Gls)
2007–2008	Yokohama FC	33	(1)
2009–2011	Albirex Niigata	78	(18)
2012–2014	Omiya Ardija	76	(7)
2014–2015	Qatar SC	24	(5)
2015–2018	Ulsan Hyundai	7	(0)
2016–2017	→ Sangju Sangmu (army)	42	(5)
2018	Gyeongnam FC	9	(0)
2019	Albirex Niigata		
2020–2022	Tiamo Hirakata		

International career^{‡}
2007–2009	South Korea U-20	17	(15)
2008–2010	South Korea U-23	15	(4)
2010–	South Korea	12	(1)
Medal record
Men's football
Representing South Korea
AFC Asian Cup
Runner-up	2015 Australia	Team
Asian Games
Bronze medal – third place	2010 Guangzhou	Team
- * Club domestic league appearances and goals as of 4 March 2021 ‡ National team caps and goals as of 13 January 2015

- Cho Young-cheol
- Hangul: 조영철
- Hanja: 曺永哲
- RR: Jo Yeongcheol
- MR: Cho Yŏngch'ŏl

Cho Young-cheol (Korean: 조영철; born 31 May 1989) is a former South Korean footballer.

== International career ==
Cho was a member of the South Korean team for the 2008 Summer Olympics in China. The following year, he represented South Korea U20 at the 2009 FIFA U-20 World Cup.

On 11 August 2010, Cho made his first appearance for the Korean senior team in a 2–1 defeat of Nigeria. He was included in South Korea's squad for 2015 AFC Asian Cup and scored his first senior international goal in the team's opening match against Oman.

== Statistics ==
=== Club statistics ===
As of 10 July 2014

Club performance			League		Cup		League Cup		Continental		Total	
Season	Club	League	Apps	Goals	Apps	Goals	Apps	Goals	Apps	Goals	Apps	Goals
Japan			League		Emperor's Cup		League Cup		AFC		Total	
2007	Yokohama FC	J1 League	9	0	1	0	0	0	—		10	0
2008	Yokohama FC	J2 League	24	1	1	0	0	0	—		25	1
2009	Albirex Niigata	J1 League	24	1	3	0	6	0	—		34	1
2010	Albirex Niigata	J1 League	29	11	0	0	6	0	—		35	11
2011	Albirex Niigata	J1 League	25	6	2	0	3	0	—		26	6
2012	Omiya Ardija	J1 League	30	4	4	2	6	0	—		40	6
2013	Omiya Ardija	J1 League	33	2	3	3	4	1	—		40	6
2014	Omiya Ardija	J1 League	13	1	4	0	0	0	—		17	1
Qatar			League		Emir of Qatar Cup		—		AFC		Total	
2014–15	Qatar SC	Qatar Stars League	24	5	0	0	—		—		24	5
South Korea			League		Korean FA Cup		—		AFC		Total	
2015	Ulsan Hyundai	K League 1	2	0	1	0	—		—		3	0
Total	Japan		187	26	18	5	25	1	0	0	230	32
Total	Qatar		24	5	0	0	—		0	0	24	5
Total	South Korea		2	0	1	0	—		0	0	3	0
Career total			213	31	19	5	25	1	0	0	257	37

=== International goals ===
Scores and results list South Korea's goal tally first, score column indicates score after each Young-cheol goal.

List of international goals scored by Cho Young-cheol
No.	Date	Venue	Opponent	Score	Result	Competition	Ref.
1	10 January 2015	Canberra Stadium, Canberra, Australia	Oman	1–0	1–0	2015 AFC Asian Cup	

== Personal life ==
He can speak Japanese fluently. His blog is written in Japanese.
