= Musashi Okuyama =

Japanese footballer

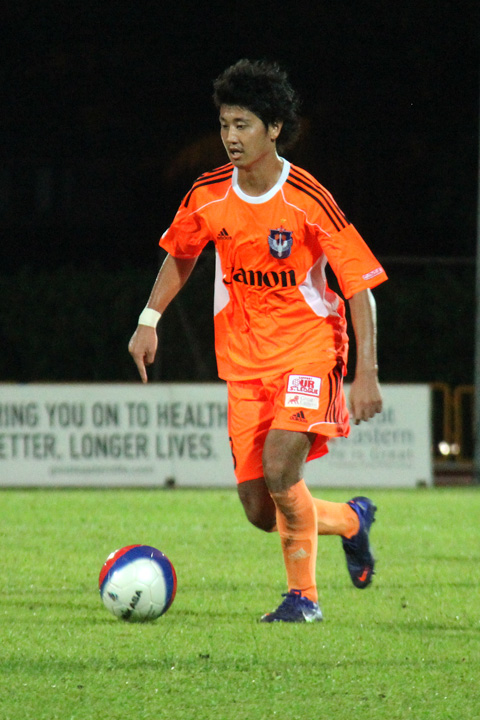
- Musashi Okuyama playing against Hougang United in an S.League fixture at Hougang Stadium on April 13, 2012

Personal information
- Full name: Musashi Okuyama
- Date of birth: May 15, 1991 (age 35)
- Place of birth: Hachijō, Tokyo, Japan
- Height: 1.76 m (5 ft 9 1/2 in)
- Position: Midfielder

Youth career
- 2007–2009: Albirex Niigata

Senior career*
Years	Team	Apps	(Gls)
2010–2013	Albirex Niigata	0	(0)
2011–2012	→Albirex Niigata Singapore (loan)	44	(4)
2014	Southern Myanmar United		
Total		44	(4)
- * Club domestic league appearances and goals

Musashi Okuyama (奥山 武宰士, Okuyama Musashi; born May 15, 1991) is a former Japanese football player.

== Career ==
=== Albirex Niigata ===
After spending two seasons in Singapore's S.League playing for Albirex Niigata Singapore FC Okuyama signed for his former club and the main team of Albirex Niigata, Albirex Niigata in the J1 League.

== Club statistics ==
Club	Season	League		National Cup		League Cup		Total	
Club	Season	Apps	Goals	Apps	Goals	Apps	Goals	Apps	Goals
Albirex Niigata Singapore	2011	21	3	4	0	2	0	27	3
Albirex Niigata Singapore	2012	23	1	3	0	1	0	27	1
Career total		44	4	7	0	3	0	54	4
