= Mitsuru Chiyotanda =

Japanese footballer

Mitsuru Chiyotanda 千代反田 充
Personal information
- Full name: Mitsuru Chiyotanda
- Date of birth: June 1, 1980 (age 46)
- Place of birth: Fukuoka, Japan
- Height: 1.83 m (6 ft 0 in)
- Position: Defender

Youth career
- 1996–1998: Higashi Fukuoka High School

College career
Years	Team	Apps	(Gls)
1999–2002	University of Tsukuba		

Senior career*
Years	Team	Apps	(Gls)
2003–2006	Avispa Fukuoka	104	(13)
2007–2009	Albirex Niigata	124	(6)
2010–2011	Nagoya Grampus	33	(0)
2012	Júbilo Iwata	7	(0)
2013–2014	Tokushima Vortis	23	(1)
Total		291	(20)
Medal record
Nagoya Grampus
Winner	J1 League	2010
Runner-up	J1 League	2011
- * Club domestic league appearances and goals

Mitsuru Chiyotanda (千代反田 充, Chiyotanda Mitsuru; born June 1, 1980) is a former Japanese football player.

== Career statistics ==
Appearances and goals by club, season and competition
Club	Season	League			Emperor's Cup		J.League Cup		Total	
Club	Season	Division	Apps	Goals	Apps	Goals	Apps	Goals	Apps	Goals
Avispa Fukuoka	2003	J2 League	26	1	0	0	—		26	1
Avispa Fukuoka	2004	J2 League	43	5	2	0	—		45	5
Avispa Fukuoka	2005	J2 League	35	7	0	0	—		35	7
Avispa Fukuoka	2006	J1 League	26	1	2	0	5	0	33	1
Albirex Niigata	2007	J1 League	33	2	1	0	4	0	38	2
Albirex Niigata	2008	J1 League	32	2	2	0	6	0	40	2
Albirex Niigata	2009	J1 League	33	1	3	0	5	0	41	1
Nagoya Grampus	2010	J1 League	16	0	3	0	6	1	25	1
Nagoya Grampus	2011	J1 League	17	0	4	0	1	0	22	0
Júbilo Iwata	2012	J1 League	7	0	1	0	3	1	11	1
Tokushima Vortis	2013	J2 League	14	1	0	0	—		14	1
Tokushima Vortis	2014	J1 League	9	0	1	0	0	0	10	0
Career total			291	20	19	0	30	0	340	20
