= 2013 Albirex Niigata season =

Albirex Niigata
2013 season
- Manager: Masaaki Yanagishita
- Stadium: Tohoku Denryoku Big Swan Stadium
- J1 League: 7th

2013 Albirex Niigata season.

== J1 League ==
Pos	Team	Pld	W	D	L	GF	GA	GD	Pts
5	Kashima Antlers	34	18	5	11	60	52	+8	59
6	Urawa Red Diamonds	34	17	7	10	66	56	+10	58
7	Albirex Niigata	34	17	4	13	48	42	+6	55
8	FC Tokyo	34	16	6	12	61	47	+14	54
9	Shimizu S-Pulse	34	15	5	14	48	57	−9	50

Updated to match(es) played on 7 December 2013. Source: J.League Division 1
Rules for classification: 1) points; 2) goal difference; 3) number of goals scored.

Match	Date	Team	Score	Team	Venue	Attendance
1	2013.03.02	Cerezo Osaka	1-0	Albirex Niigata	Osaka Nagai Stadium	15,051
2	2013.03.09	Albirex Niigata	1-2	Sanfrecce Hiroshima	Tohoku Denryoku Big Swan Stadium	28,118
3	2013.03.16	Omiya Ardija	1-1	Albirex Niigata	NACK5 Stadium Omiya	10,485
4	2013.03.30	Albirex Niigata	0-2	Urawa Reds	Tohoku Denryoku Big Swan Stadium	29,095
5	2013.04.06	Vegalta Sendai	0-1	Albirex Niigata	Yurtec Stadium Sendai	12,883
6	2013.04.13	Nagoya Grampus	2-0	Albirex Niigata	Toyota Stadium	13,159
7	2013.04.20	Albirex Niigata	1-0	Yokohama F. Marinos	Tohoku Denryoku Big Swan Stadium	21,415
8	2013.04.27	Albirex Niigata	2-3	Kashima Antlers	Tohoku Denryoku Big Swan Stadium	23,578
9	2013.05.03	Shimizu S-Pulse	1-2	Albirex Niigata	IAI Stadium Nihondaira	16,380
10	2013.05.06	Albirex Niigata	1-1	Ventforet Kofu	Tohoku Denryoku Big Swan Stadium	27,720
11	2013.05.11	Sagan Tosu	1-3	Albirex Niigata	Best Amenity Stadium	7,376
12	2013.05.18	Albirex Niigata	2-3	Oita Trinita	Tohoku Denryoku Big Swan Stadium	25,279
13	2013.05.25	Kawasaki Frontale	2-1	Albirex Niigata	Kawasaki Todoroki Stadium	16,002
14	2013.07.06	Albirex Niigata	3-2	Kashiwa Reysol	Tohoku Denryoku Big Swan Stadium	26,547
15	2013.07.10	Júbilo Iwata	2-1	Albirex Niigata	Yamaha Stadium	5,698
16	2013.07.13	Albirex Niigata	0-3	FC Tokyo	Tohoku Denryoku Big Swan Stadium	26,547
17	2013.07.17	Shonan Bellmare	0-2	Albirex Niigata	Shonan BMW Stadium Hiratsuka	6,080
18	2013.07.31	Albirex Niigata	1-0	Cerezo Osaka	Tohoku Denryoku Big Swan Stadium	18,919
19	2013.08.03	Albirex Niigata	3-1	Shimizu S-Pulse	Tohoku Denryoku Big Swan Stadium	22,650
20	2013.08.10	Ventforet Kofu	1-1	Albirex Niigata	Yamanashi Chuo Bank Stadium	12,749
21	2013.08.17	Kashima Antlers	1-0	Albirex Niigata	Kashima Soccer Stadium	16,392
22	2013.08.24	Albirex Niigata	2-1	Kawasaki Frontale	Tohoku Denryoku Big Swan Stadium	28,342
23	2013.08.28	Albirex Niigata	4-2	Júbilo Iwata	Tohoku Denryoku Big Swan Stadium	18,926
24	2013.08.31	Urawa Reds	1-0	Albirex Niigata	Saitama Stadium 2002	40,372
25	2013.09.14	Albirex Niigata	1-0	Omiya Ardija	Tohoku Denryoku Big Swan Stadium	33,378
26	2013.09.21	Sanfrecce Hiroshima	2-0	Albirex Niigata	Edion Stadium Hiroshima	16,196
27	2013.09.28	Kashiwa Reysol	1-1	Albirex Niigata	Hitachi Kashiwa Stadium	10,290
28	2013.10.05	Albirex Niigata	3-1	Sagan Tosu	Tohoku Denryoku Big Swan Stadium	26,514
29	2013.10.19	FC Tokyo	2-0	Albirex Niigata	Ajinomoto Stadium	21,743
30	2013.10.27	Albirex Niigata	3-2	Shonan Bellmare	Tohoku Denryoku Big Swan Stadium	23,949
31	2013.11.10	Oita Trinita	1-3	Albirex Niigata	Oita Bank Dome	8,039
32	2013.11.23	Albirex Niigata	1-0	Vegalta Sendai	Tohoku Denryoku Big Swan Stadium	32,425
33	2013.11.30	Yokohama F. Marinos	0-2	Albirex Niigata	Nissan Stadium	62,632
34	2013.12.07	Albirex Niigata	2-0	Nagoya Grampus	Tohoku Denryoku Big Swan Stadium	30,504
