= Hiroshi Nakano (footballer) =

Japanese footballer

Personal information
- Full name: Hiroshi Nakano
- Date of birth: October 23, 1983 (age 43)
- Place of birth: Saga, Japan
- Height: 1.74 m (5 ft 9 in)
- Position: Defender

College career
Years	Team	Apps	(Gls)
2002–2005	University of Tsukuba		

Senior career*
Years	Team	Apps	(Gls)
2006–2010	Albirex Niigata	59	(0)
2011–2012	Yokohama FC	42	(0)
2013–2015	Tochigi SC	26	(0)
Total		127	(0)
- * Club domestic league appearances and goals

Hiroshi Nakano (中野 洋司, Nakano Hiroshi; born October 23, 1983) is a Japanese former footballer.

== Club statistics ==
Club performance			League		Cup		League Cup		Total	
Season	Club	League	Apps	Goals	Apps	Goals	Apps	Goals	Apps	Goals
Japan			League		Emperor's Cup		League Cup		Total	
2006	Albirex Niigata	J1 League	25	0	2	0	6	0	33	0
2007	Albirex Niigata	J1 League	7	0	1	0	2	0	10	0
2008	Albirex Niigata	J1 League	11	0	1	0	3	0	15	0
2009	Albirex Niigata	J1 League	8	0	1	0	2	0	1	0
2010	Albirex Niigata	J1 League	8	0	1	0	4	0	13	0
2011	Yokohama FC	J2 League	33	0	1	0	-		34	0
2012	Yokohama FC	J2 League	9	0	1	0	-		10	0
2013	Tochigi SC	J2 League	6	0	0	0	-		6	0
2014	Tochigi SC	J2 League	8	0	0	0	-		8	0
2015	Tochigi SC	J2 League	12	0	1	0	-		13	0
Career total			127	0	9	0	17	0	153	0
