= Takashi Kitano =

Japanese footballer (born 1982)

Takashi Kitano 北野 貴之
Personal information
- Full name: Takashi Kitano
- Date of birth: October 4, 1982 (age 44)
- Place of birth: Sapporo, Hokkaido, Japan
- Height: 1.86 m (6 ft 1 in)
- Position: Goalkeeper

Youth career
- 1998–2000: Hokkai High School
- 2001–2002: Sapporo University

Senior career*
Years	Team	Apps	(Gls)
2003–2009	Albirex Niigata	124	(0)
2010–2014	Omiya Ardija	134	(0)
2015–2016	Cerezo Osaka	0	(0)
2016	→ Cerezo Osaka U-23 (loan)	7	(0)
2017	Yokohama FC	0	(0)
2018–2019	Gainare Tottori	30	(0)
- * Club domestic league appearances and goals

Takashi Kitano (北野 貴之, Kitano Takashi; born October 4, 1982) is a Japanese former football player.

== Club statistics ==
As of 22 February 2018.

Club performance			League		Cup		League Cup		Total	
Season	Club	League	Apps	Goals	Apps	Goals	Apps	Goals	Apps	Goals
Japan			League		Emperor's Cup		J.League Cup		Total	
2003	Albirex Niigata	J2 League	0	0	0	0	-		0	0
2004	Albirex Niigata	J1 League	0	0	0	0	0	0	0	0
2005	Albirex Niigata	J1 League	0	0	0	0	0	0	0	0
2006	Albirex Niigata	J1 League	24	0	2	0	4	0	30	0
2007	Albirex Niigata	J1 League	34	0	1	0	6	0	41	0
2008	Albirex Niigata	J1 League	32	0	2	0	4	0	38	0
2009	Albirex Niigata	J1 League	34	0	4	0	4	0	42	0
2010	Omiya Ardija	J1 League	34	0	2	0	4	0	40	0
2011	Omiya Ardija	J1 League	34	0	1	0	0	0	35	0
2012	Omiya Ardija	J1 League	24	0	2	0	2	0	28	0
2013	Omiya Ardija	J1 League	27	0	3	0	4	0	34	0
2014	Omiya Ardija	J1 League	15	0	1	0	1	0	17	0
2015	Cerezo Osaka	J2 League	0	0	0	0	–		0	0
2016	Cerezo Osaka	J2 League	0	0	0	0	–		0	0
2016	Cerezo Osaka U-23	J3 League	7	0	–		–		7	0
2017	Yokohama FC	J2 League	0	0	0	0	–		0	0
Career total			265	0	18	0	29	0	312	0
