= Márcio Richardes =

Brazilian footballer

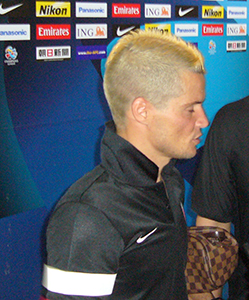

Personal information
- Full name: Marcio Richardes de Andrade
- Date of birth: 30 November 1981 (age 44)
- Place of birth: Andradina, Brazil
- Height: 1.73 m (5 ft 8 in)
- Position: Attacking midfielder

Senior career*
Years	Team	Apps	(Gls)
1999	CA Catarinense	?	(?)
2000	CA Sorocaba	?	(?)
2001–2002	Coritiba	?	(?)
2003	União São João	?	(?)
2003	Itumbiara	?	(?)
2004	Oeste	?	(?)
2004–2005	Criciúma	15	(1)
2005–2006	São Caetano	24	(6)
2006	Marília	?	(?)
2007	São Caetano	?	(?)
2007–2010	Albirex Niigata	107	(38)
2011–2014	Urawa Reds	98	(17)
- * Club domestic league appearances and goals as of 11 December 2014

Márcio Richardes de Andrade (born 30 November 1981) is a Brazilian midfielder. He is currently a free agent.

== Career ==
Márcio Richardes played for Criciúma and São Caetano in the Campeonato Brasileiro. He has also played for Alberex Niigata and Urawa Red Diamonds in the J1 League. In 2010, Richardes became the first known player to score a perfect hat-trick of set pieces: successfully converting a free kick, corner kick, and penalty in the same game.

== Club statistics ==
Club	Season	League		Cup^{1}		League Cup^{2}		Continental^{3}		Total	
Club	Season	Apps	Goals	Apps	Goals	Apps	Goals	Apps	Goals	Apps	Goals
Criciúma	2004	15	1								
Criciúma	Total	15	1								
São Caetano	2005	24	6								
São Caetano	Total	24	6								
Albirex Niigata	2007	28	9	1	0	6	2	–		35	11
Albirex Niigata	2008	24	3	2	1	4	1	–		30	5
Albirex Niigata	2009	29	10	3	1	5	0	–		37	11
Albirex Niigata	2010	29	16	2	2	6	2	–		34	20
Albirex Niigata	Total	107	38	8	4	21	5	–		136	47
Urawa Reds	2011	30	3	2	1	5	1	–		37	5
Urawa Reds	2012	31	9	1	0	2	1	–		34	10
Urawa Reds	2013	26	5	1	1	4	0	6	1	37	7
Urawa Reds	2014	11	0	1	0	1	0	–		13	0
Urawa Reds	Total	98	17	5	2	12	2	6	1	121	22
Career total		244	62	13	6	33	7	6	1	358	76

^{1}Includes Emperor's Cup.

^{2}Includes J. League Cup.

== Honors and awards ==
=== Individual ===
- J. League Best Eleven: 1

2010
