= Kazuhisa Kawahara (footballer) =

Japanese footballer

Kazuhisa Kawahara 河原 和寿
Personal information
- Full name: Kazuhisa Kawahara
- Date of birth: 29 January 1987 (age 39)
- Place of birth: Gyōda, Saitama, Japan
- Height: 1.73 m (5 ft 8 in)
- Position: Striker

Youth career
- 2002–2004: Ōmiya Higashi High School

Senior career*
Years	Team	Apps	(Gls)
2005–2010	Albirex Niigata	41	(2)
2009	→ Tochigi SC (loan)	48	(13)
2010	Oita Trinita	17	(2)
2011–2012	Tochigi SC	45	(3)
2013–2019	Ehime FC	214	(44)

International career
2007	Japan U-20	3	(0)
Medal record
Representing Japan
AFC U-19 Championship
Silver medal – second place	2006 India
- * Club domestic league appearances and goals

Kazuhisa Kawahara (河原 和寿, Kawahara Kazuhisa; born 29 January 1987 in Gyōda, Saitama) is a Japanese retired football player.

== National team career ==
In July 2007, Kawahara was elected Japan U-20 national team for 2007 U-20 World Cup. At this tournament, he played 3 matches.

After seven seasons with Ehime FC, he retired at the end of 2019 season.

== Club statistics ==
Updated to 1 January 2020.

Club performance			League		Cup		League Cup		Total	
Season	Club	League	Apps	Goals	Apps	Goals	Apps	Goals	Apps	Goals
Japan			League		Emperor's Cup		J. League Cup		Total	
2005	Albirex Niigata	J1 League	0	0	1	0	1	0	2	0
2006	Albirex Niigata	J1 League	5	1	1	0	0	0	6	1
2007	Albirex Niigata	J1 League	14	1	1	1	3	0	18	2
2008	Albirex Niigata	J1 League	18	0	2	0	3	0	23	0
2009	Tochigi SC	J2 League	48	13	1	0	-		49	13
2010	Albirex Niigata	J1 League	4	0	-		0	0	4	0
2010	Oita Trinita	J2 League	17	2	2	1	-		19	3
2011	Tochigi SC	J2 League	29	2	2	1	-		31	3
2012	Tochigi SC	J2 League	16	1	1	0	-		17	0
2013	Ehime FC	J2 League	34	5	0	0	-		34	5
2014	Ehime FC	J2 League	38	13	2	2	-		40	15
2015	Ehime FC	J2 League	41	11	1	1	-		42	12
2016	Ehime FC	J2 League	31	2	2	0	-		33	2
2017	Ehime FC	J2 League	37	11	0	0	-		37	11
2018	Ehime FC	J2 League	26	2	0	0	-		26	2
2019	Ehime FC	J2 League	6	0	1	0	-		7	0
Career total			364	65	17	6	7	0	389	71
