= Kazuhiko Chiba =

Japanese footballer (born 1985)

Kazuhiko Chiba 千葉 和彦
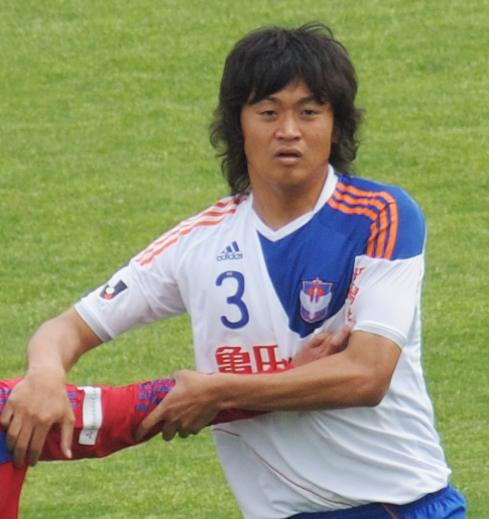
- Chiba with Albirex Niigata in 2010

Personal information
- Full name: Kazuhiko Chiba
- Date of birth: 21 June 1985 (age 41)
- Place of birth: Kushiro, Hokkaidō, Japan
- Height: 1.83 m (6 ft 0 in)
- Position: Defender

Team information
- Current team: FC Ryukyu
- Number: 35

Youth career
- 1994–1997: Kushiro Tomihara FC
- 1998–2000: Kyohoku Junior High School
- 2001–2003: Nissei Gakuen Daini High School

Senior career*
Years	Team	Apps	(Gls)
2004–2005	AGOVV	21	(0)
2005	Dordrecht	0	(0)
2005–2011	Albirex Niigata	147	(1)
2012–2018	Sanfrecce Hiroshima	203	(6)
2019–2020	Nagoya Grampus	1	(0)
2021–2026	Albirex Niigata	89	(4)
2026–	FC Ryukyu	3	(0)

International career^{‡}
2013	Japan	1	(0)
Medal record
Sanfrecce Hiroshima
Winner	J1 League	2012
Winner	J1 League	2013
Winner	J1 League	2015
Runner-up	J1 League	2018
Runner-up	J.League Cup	2014
Runner-up	Emperor's Cup	2013
- * Club domestic league appearances and goals as of 12:51, 5 November 2026 (UTC) ‡ National team caps and goals as of 28 July 2013

Kazuhiko Chiba (千葉 和彦, Chiba Kazuhiko; born 21 June 1985) is a Japanese footballer who currently plays for J3 League club FC Ryukyu.

== Career ==
On 24 December 2020, Chiba was announced at Albirex Niigata. On 1 January 2022, his contract with the club was extended for the 2022 season. On 2 December 2022, the club announced that they had extended Chiba's contract for the 2023 season. On 20 December 2023, his contract with the club was extended for the 2024 season.

== Club statistics ==
As of 5 November 2026.

Appearances and goals by club, season and competition
Club	Season	League			National cup (Note: Includes Amstel Cup, Emperor's Cup)		League cup (Note: Includes J.League Cup)		Continental		Other		Total	
Club	Season	Division	Apps	Goals	Apps	Goals	Apps	Goals	Apps	Goals	Apps	Goals	Apps	Goals
AGOVV Apeldoorn	2003–04	Eerste Divisie	0	0	0	0	–		–		–		0	0
AGOVV Apeldoorn	2004–05	Eerste Divisie	21	0	1	0	–		–		–		22	0
AGOVV Apeldoorn	Total		21	0	1	0	0	0	0	0	0	0	22	0
Dordrecht	2005–06	Eerste Divisie	0	0	0	0	–		–		–		0	0
Albirex Niigata	2005	J.League Division 1	0	0	0	0	0	0	–		–		0	0
Albirex Niigata	2006	J.League Division 1	14	0	2	0	2	0	–		–		18	0
Albirex Niigata	2007	J.League Division 1	27	0	1	0	6	1	–		–		34	1
Albirex Niigata	2008	J.League Division 1	31	0	2	1	6	0	–		–		39	1
Albirex Niigata	2009	J.League Division 1	13	0	2	0	2	0	–		–		17	0
Albirex Niigata	2010	J.League Division 1	33	0	3	0	5	0	–		–		41	0
Albirex Niigata	2011	J.League Division 1	29	1	1	0	3	0	–		–		33	1
Albirex Niigata	Total		147	1	11	1	24	1	0	0	0	0	182	3
Sanfrecce Hiroshima	2012	J.League Division 1	33	1	1	0	6	0	0	0	3 (Note: Appearance in FIFA Club World Cup)	0	43	1
Sanfrecce Hiroshima	2013	J.League Division 1	34	1	6	1	2	0	4 (Note: Appearances in AFC Champions League)	0	1 (Note: Appearance in Japanese Super Cup)	0	47	2
Sanfrecce Hiroshima	2014	J.League Division 1	30	1	1	0	5	0	6	1	1	0	43	2
Sanfrecce Hiroshima	2015	J1 League	34	1	3	0	5	0	0	0	5 (Note: Two appearances in J.League Championship) (Note: Three appearances, one goal in FIFA Club World Cup)	1	47	2
Sanfrecce Hiroshima	2016	J1 League	30	0	0	0	2	0	5	1	1	0	38	1
Sanfrecce Hiroshima	2017	J1 League	31	0	1	0	3	0	0	0	0	0	35	0
Sanfrecce Hiroshima	2018	J1 League	11	2	2	0	0	0	0	0	0	0	13	2
Sanfrecce Hiroshima	Total		203	6	14	1	23	0	15	2	11	1	266	10
Nagoya Grampus	2019	J1 League	1	0	1	0	5	0	–		–		7	0
Nagoya Grampus	2020	J1 League	0	0	0	0	0	0	–		–		0	0
Nagoya Grampus	Total		1	0	1	0	5	0	0	0	0	0	7	0
Albirex Niigata	2021	J2 League	39	2	0	0	0	0	–		–		39	2
Albirex Niigata	2022	J2 League	25	0	0	0	0	0	–		–		25	0
Albirex Niigata	2023	J1 League	12	1	3	0	1	0	–		–		16	1
Albirex Niigata	2024	J1 League	8	1	2	0	2	0	–		–		12	1
Albirex Niigata	2025	J1 League	5	0	1	0	3	0	–		–		9	0
Albirex Niigata	Total		89	4	6	0	6	0	0	0	0	0	101	4
FC Ryukyu	2026	J2/J3 (100)	3	0	–		–		–		–		3	0
FC Ryukyu	2026–27	J3 League	0	0	–		0	0	–		–		0	0
FC Ryukyu	Total		3	0	0	0	0	0	0	0	0	0	3	0
Career total			464	11	33	2	58	1	15	2	11	1	581	17

== National team statistics ==
Japan national team
Year	Apps	Goals
2013	1	0
Total	1	0

== Honours ==
=== Club ===
Sanfrecce Hiroshima

- J1 League: 2012, 2013, 2015
- Japanese Super Cup: 2013, 2014, 2016

=== International ===
Japan

- EAFF East Asian Cup: 2013
