= List of Albirex Niigata players =

Albirex Niigata is a Japanese football club based in Niigata. The following list contains all the footballers that have made over 100 league appearances for the club. Other players who are deemed to have played an important role for the club can be included, but the reason for their notability should be included in the 'Notes' column.

== Players ==
- Players whose name is in **bold** currently play for the club.
- (n/a) = Information not available

Statistics correct as of the end of the 2016 season

Name	Nationality	Position	Club career	Appearances	Goals	Notes	References
Yōsuke Nozawa	Japan	Goalkeeper	2000–2008	187	0		
Takashi Kitano	Japan	Goalkeeper	2003–2009	124	0		
Sergio	Brazil	Defender	1999–2002	127	12		
Naoki Takahashi	Japan	Defender	1999–2005	141	4		
Katsuo Kanda	Japan	Defender	2000–2003	114	5		
Yoshiaki Maruyama	Japan	Defender	2002–2005	114	1		
Hikaru Mita	Japan	Defender	2002–2007	103	1		
Kazuhiko Chiba	Japan	Defender	2005–2011, 2021-	147	1		
Mitsuru Nagata	Japan	Defender	2006–2010	119	1	^{[A]}	
Jun Uchida	Japan	Defender	2006–2013	143	5		
Gotoku Sakai	Japan	Defender	2008–2011	74	1	^{[A]}	
Kim Jin-su	South Korea	Defender	2012–2014	64	1	^{[A]}	
Kentaro Ohi	Japan	Defender	2012–2015	107	5		
Kenji Komata	Japan	Midfielder	1996–1998	n/a	n/a	^{[B]}	
Tadahiro Akiba	Japan	Midfielder	1999–2004	204	2		
Shingo Suzuki	Japan	Midfielder	1999–2007	252	53		
**Isao Homma**	Japan	Midfielder	2000–2014, 2017–	312	13	^{[C]}	
Yoshito Terakawa	Japan	Midfielder	2000–2002, 2004–2008	256	24		
An Yong-hak	North Korea	Midfielder	2002–2004	94	7	^{[A]}	
Motohiro Yamaguchi	Japan	Midfielder	2003–2005	83	6	^{[D]}	
Fabinho	Brazil	Midfielder	2003–2006	104	30		
Atomu Tanaka	Japan	Midfielder	2005–2014	200	17		
Toshihiro Matsushita	Japan	Midfielder	2006–2009	106	9		
Marcio Richardes	Brazil	Midfielder	2007–2010	107	38		
Yuta Mikado	Japan	Midfielder	2009–2013	138	7		
Cho Young-cheol	South Korea	Midfielder	2009–2011	77	18	^{[A]}	
Sho Naruoka	Japan	Midfielder	2013–	101	10		
Léo Silva	Brazil	Midfielder	2013–2016	122	16	^{[H]}	
Masahiro Fukasawa	Japan	Forward	2000–2004	157	8		
Marcus	Brazil	Forward	2002–2003	77	51	^{[E]}	
Yusaku Ueno	Japan	Forward	2003–2005	105	20		
Edmilson	Brazil	Forward	2004–2007	116	62	^{[F]}	
**Kisho Yano**	Japan	Forward	2005–2010, 2012, 2017–	182	32	^{[A]}	
Kengo Kawamata	Japan	Forward	2008–2014	75	26	^{[G]}	

== Notes ==
- A.
  Players who represented their country while at the club.
- B. Kenji Komata was awarded the most valuable player of the 1996 Hokushin'etsu League.
- C. Isao Homma is the all-time appearance record holder.
- D. Moto Yamaguchi won the 2004 J. League Second Division as captain.
- E. Marcus is third in the all time goalscoring tables with 51. Marcus also holds the club record of most league goals in one season with 32 in 2003.
- F. Edmilson is the club's record goalscorer in the J. League with 62 goals.
- G. Kengo Kawamata was awarded the 2013 J. League Best XI.
- H. Léo Silva was awarded the 2014 J. League Best XI.
