= 2002 Albirex Niigata season =

Albirex Niigata
2002 season
- Manager: Yasuharu Sorimachi
- Stadium: Niigata Stadium
- J. League 2: 3rd
- Emperor's Cup: 3rd Round
- Top goalscorer: Marcus (19)
- Average home league attendance: 21,478
Home colours	Away colours

2002 Albirex Niigata season

== Competitions ==
Competitions	Position
J. League 2	3rd / 12 clubs
Emperor's Cup	3rd Round

== Domestic results ==
=== J. League 2 ===
Match	Date	Venue	Opponents	Score
1	2002.3.3	Hitachinaka (ja:ひたちなか市総合運動公園陸上競技場)	Mito HollyHock	1-0
2	2002.3.9	Mitsuzawa Stadium	Yokohama F.C.	2-0
3	2002.3.17	Niigata Stadium	Oita Trinita	0-1
4	2002.3.21	Niigata City Athletic Stadium	Shonan Bellmare	2-2
5	2002.3.24	Tosu Stadium	Sagan Tosu	1-1
6	2002.3.30	Yamagata Park Stadium	Montedio Yamagata	1-1
7	2002.4.6	Niigata Stadium	Avispa Fukuoka	0-1
8	2002.4.10	Ōmiya Park Soccer Stadium	Omiya Ardija	1-4
9	2002.4.14	Niigata City Athletic Stadium	Kawasaki Frontale	2-1
10	2002.4.20	Kose Sports Stadium	Ventforet Kofu	3-1
11	2002.4.24	Niigata City Athletic Stadium	Cerezo Osaka	5-2
12	2002.4.27	Niigata Stadium	Yokohama F.C.	2-0
13	2002.5.3	Hiratsuka Athletics Stadium	Shonan Bellmare	4-1
14	2002.5.6	Niigata City Athletic Stadium	Sagan Tosu	6-2
15	2002.5.12	Niigata City Athletic Stadium	Montedio Yamagata	1-0
16	2002.7.6	Hakata no mori stadium	Avispa Fukuoka	1-0
17	2002.7.10	Niigata Stadium	Omiya Ardija	2-2
18	2002.7.13	Nagai Stadium	Cerezo Osaka	3-1
19	2002.7.20	Niigata Stadium	Mito HollyHock	1-0
20	2002.7.24	Todoroki Athletics Stadium	Kawasaki Frontale	0-2
21	2002.7.27	Niigata Stadium	Ventforet Kofu	1-0
22	2002.8.3	Ōita Stadium	Oita Trinita	1-1
23	2002.8.7	Niigata Stadium	Montedio Yamagata	2-0
24	2002.8.10	Niigata Stadium	Cerezo Osaka	0-0
25	2002.8.16	Saitama Stadium 2002	Omiya Ardija	1-0
26	2002.8.21	Niigata City Athletic Stadium	Kawasaki Frontale	2-1
27	2002.8.25	Mitsuzawa (ja:横浜市Mitsuzawa Stadium公園陸上競技場)	Yokohama F.C.	2-1
28	2002.8.31	Kasamatsu Stadium	Mito HollyHock	1-2
29	2002.9.7	Niigata Stadium	Avispa Fukuoka	2-2
30	2002.9.11	Kose Sports Stadium	Ventforet Kofu	1-2
31	2002.9.14	Niigata Stadium	Shonan Bellmare	2-1
32	2002.9.21	Tosu Stadium	Sagan Tosu	2-0
33	2002.9.25	Niigata Stadium	Oita Trinita	1-1
34	2002.9.28	Yamagata Park Stadium	Montedio Yamagata	1-0
35	2002.10.5	Todoroki Athletics Stadium	Kawasaki Frontale	2-1
36	2002.10.9	Niigata City Athletic Stadium	Ventforet Kofu	1-1
37	2002.10.12	Hiratsuka Athletics Stadium	Shonan Bellmare	1-1
38	2002.10.19	Niigata City Athletic Stadium	Yokohama F.C.	5-0
39	2002.10.23	Oita (ja:大分市営陸上競技場)	Oita Trinita	1-2
40	2002.10.29	Niigata City Athletic Stadium	Sagan Tosu	1-1
41	2002.11.2	Hakata no mori stadium	Avispa Fukuoka	2-2
42	2002.11.9	Niigata City Athletic Stadium	Omiya Ardija	2-2
43	2002.11.16	Nagai Stadium	Cerezo Osaka	0-3
44	2002.11.24	Niigata City Athletic Stadium	Mito HollyHock	3-1

=== Emperor's Cup ===
Match	Date	Venue	Opponents	Score
1st Round	2002..	[[]]	[[]]	-
2nd Round	2002..	[[]]	[[]]	-
3rd Round	2002..	[[]]	[[]]	-

== Player statistics ==
No.	Pos.	Player	D.o.B. (Age)	Height / Weight	J. League 2		Emperor's Cup		Total	
No.	Pos.	Player	D.o.B. (Age)	Height / Weight	Apps	Goals	Apps	Goals	Apps	Goals
1	GK	Koichi Kidera	April 4, 1972 (aged 29)	cm / kg	2	0				
2	DF	Yoshiaki Maruyama	October 12, 1974 (aged 27)	cm / kg	40	0				
3	DF	Sérgio	September 19, 1975 (aged 26)	cm / kg	39	6				
4	DF	Nobuhiro Shiba	April 18, 1974 (aged 27)	cm / kg	0	0				
5	DF	Katsuo Kanda	June 21, 1966 (aged 35)	cm / kg	33	2				
6	MF	Tadahiro Akiba	October 13, 1975 (aged 26)	cm / kg	41	1				
7	MF	Yoshito Terakawa	September 6, 1974 (aged 27)	cm / kg	42	9				
8	MF	Beto	March 16, 1973 (aged 28)	cm / kg	29	11				
10	MF	Marcus	February 25, 1974 (aged 28)	cm / kg	36	19				
11	FW	Ryoji Ujihara	May 10, 1981 (aged 20)	cm / kg	34	5				
12	MF	Katsuyuki Miyazawa	September 15, 1976 (aged 25)	cm / kg	31	6				
13	DF	Kenji Arai	May 19, 1978 (aged 23)	cm / kg	2	0				
14	DF	Naoki Takahashi	August 8, 1976 (aged 25)	cm / kg	14	1				
15	MF	Isao Homma	April 19, 1981 (aged 20)	cm / kg	6	0				
16	MF	Ryuji Sueoka	May 22, 1979 (aged 22)	cm / kg	5	0				
17	MF	An Yong-Hak	October 25, 1978 (aged 23)	cm / kg	39	3				
18	DF	Masaya Karube	May 13, 1979 (aged 22)	cm / kg	0	0				
19	DF	Hikaru Mita	August 1, 1981 (aged 20)	cm / kg	30	0				
20	GK	Nobuhiro Maeda	June 3, 1973 (aged 28)	cm / kg	0	0				
21	GK	Yosuke Nozawa	November 9, 1979 (aged 22)	cm / kg	43	0				
22	FW	Taro Hasegawa	August 17, 1979 (aged 22)	cm / kg	12	0				
23	MF	Masahiro Fukazawa	July 12, 1977 (aged 24)	cm / kg	39	3				
24	FW	Koichiro Katafuchi	April 29, 1975 (aged 26)	cm / kg	3	0				
25	FW	Toru Kaburagi	April 18, 1976 (aged 25)	cm / kg	5	0				
26	MF	Satoru Kobayashi	August 26, 1973 (aged 28)	cm / kg	39	1				
27	DF	Shinobu Arai	October 24, 1983 (aged 18)	cm / kg	0	0				
28	FW	Yuzo Funakoshi	June 12, 1977 (aged 24)	cm / kg	34	7				
29	DF	Masato Kawaguchi	June 18, 1981 (aged 20)	cm / kg	0	0				
30	MF	Masahiro Ōhashi	June 23, 1981 (aged 20)	cm / kg	4	0				
31	MF	Goichi Ueno	September 24, 1982 (aged 19)	cm / kg	0	0				
32	DF	Tatsunori Yamagata	October 4, 1983 (aged 18)	cm / kg	2	0				
33	MF	Shinya Chiba	May 3, 1983 (aged 18)	cm / kg	1	0				
34	FW	Yuki Hamaguchi	November 30, 1982 (aged 19)	cm / kg	0	0				
35	DF	Kenta Numajiri	May 6, 1980 (aged 21)	cm / kg	0	0				
36	DF	Shinji Jojo	August 28, 1977 (aged 24)	cm / kg	1	0				

== Other pages ==
- (in Japanese) J. League official site
