= 2001 Albirex Niigata season =

Albirex Niigata
2001 season
- Manager: Yasuharu Sorimachi
- Stadium: Niigata Stadium
- J.League 2: 4th
- Emperor's Cup: 4th Round
- J.League Cup: 1st Round
- Top goalscorer: Hisashi Kurosaki (21)
- Average home league attendance: 16,659
Home colours	Away colours

This article chronicles the 2001 season for the Japanese association football club Albirex Niigata.

== Competitions ==
Competitions	Position
J.League 2	4th / 12 clubs
Emperor's Cup	4th round
J.League Cup	1st round

== Domestic results ==
=== J.League 2 ===
11 March 2001 1	Sagan Tosu	1-1 (GG) (a.e.t.)	Albirex Niigata	Tosu Stadium
JST (UTC+09)

17 March 2001 2	Kyoto Purple Sanga	1-0	Albirex Niigata	Nishikyogoku Athletic Stadium
JST (UTC+09)

24 March 2001 3	Albirex Niigata	1-1 (GG) (a.e.t.)	Montedio Yamagata	Niigata City Athletic Stadium
JST (UTC+09)

31 March 2001 4	Albirex Niigata	1-0	Kawasaki Frontale	Niigata City Athletic Stadium
JST (UTC+09)

7 April 2001 5	Shonan Bellmare	3-2 (GG) (a.e.t.)	Albirex Niigata	Hiratsuka Athletics Stadium
JST (UTC+09)

14 April 2001 6	Albirex Niigata	0-1 (GG) (a.e.t.)	Vegalta Sendai	Niigata City Athletic Stadium
JST (UTC+09)

21 April 2001 7	Oita Trinita	0-2	Albirex Niigata	Oita Athletic Stadium
JST (UTC+09)

28 April 2001 8	Albirex Niigata	2-2 (GG) (a.e.t.)	Omiya Ardija	Niigata City Athletic Stadium
JST (UTC+09)

3 May 2001 9	Mito HollyHock	0-2	Albirex Niigata	Hitachinaka City Stadium
JST (UTC+09)

6 May 2001 10	Albirex Niigata	2-1	Yokohama FC	Niigata City Athletic Stadium
JST (UTC+09)

12 May 2001 11	Ventforet Kofu	0-2	Albirex Niigata	Kose Sports Park Stadium
JST (UTC+09)

19 May 2001 12	Albirex Niigata	3-4 (GG) (a.e.t.)	Kyoto Purple Sanga	Niigata Stadium
JST (UTC+09)

23 May 2001 13	Montedio Yamagata	0-1	Albirex Niigata	Yamagata Park Stadium
JST (UTC+09)

27 May 2001 14	Vegalta Sendai	0-2	Albirex Niigata	Sendai Stadium
JST (UTC+09)

16 June 2001 15	Albirex Niigata	2-3	Oita Trinita	Niigata City Athletic Stadium
JST (UTC+09)

23 June 2001 16	Yokohama FC	1-0	Albirex Niigata	Yokohama Mitsuzawa Stadium
JST (UTC+09)

28 June 2001 17	Albirex Niigata	4-0	Ventforet Kofu	Niigata City Athletic Stadium
JST (UTC+09)

7 July 2001 18	Omiya Ardija	2-1	Albirex Niigata	Omiya Football Stadium
JST (UTC+09)

11 July 2001 19	Albirex Niigata	2-0	Mito HollyHock	Niigata City Athletic Stadium
JST (UTC+09)

14 July 2001 20	Albirex Niigata	5-0	Sagan Tosu	Niigata Stadium
JST (UTC+09)

21 July 2001 21	Kawasaki Frontale	2-3 (GG) (a.e.t.)	Albirex Niigata	Todoroki Athletics Stadium
JST (UTC+09)

25 July 2001 22	Albirex Niigata	2-0	Shonan Bellmare	Niigata Stadium
JST (UTC+09)

28 July 2001 23	Ventforet Kofu	0-1	Albirex Niigata	Kose Sports Park Stadium
JST (UTC+09)

3 August 2001 24	Albirex Niigata	0-1 (GG) (a.e.t.)	Montedio Yamagata	Niigata Stadium
JST (UTC+09)

11 August 2001 25	Albirex Niigata	1-0 (GG) (a.e.t.)	Omiya Ardija	Niigata Stadium
JST (UTC+09)

14 August 2001 26	Mito HollyHock	2-0	Albirex Niigata	Kasamatsu Stadium
JST (UTC+09)

18 August 2001 27	Albirex Niigata	1-0	Vegalta Sendai	Niigata Stadium
JST (UTC+09)

25 August 2001 28	Oita Trinita	2-2 (GG) (a.e.t.)	Albirex Niigata	Ōita Stadium
JST (UTC+09)

1 September 2001 29	Albirex Niigata	2-0	Kawasaki Frontale	Niigata Stadium
JST (UTC+09)

5 September 2001 30	Shonan Bellmare	1-0 (GG) (a.e.t.)	Albirex Niigata	Hiratsuka Athletics Stadium
JST (UTC+09)

8 September 2001 31	Albirex Niigata	5-1	Yokohama FC	Niigata Stadium
JST (UTC+09)

15 September 2001 32	Kyoto Purple Sanga	2-0	Albirex Niigata	Nishikyogoku Athletic Stadium
JST (UTC+09)

19 September 2001 33	Albirex Niigata	4-1	Sagan Tosu	Niigata Stadium
JST (UTC+09)

22 September 2001 34	Omiya Ardija	0-3	Albirex Niigata	Omiya Football Stadium
JST (UTC+09)

29 September 2001 35	Albirex Niigata	2-1 (GG) (a.e.t.)	Oita Trinita	Niigata Stadium
JST (UTC+09)

6 October 2001 36	Vegalta Sendai	4-2	Albirex Niigata	Sendai Stadium
JST (UTC+09)

13 October 2001 37	Albirex Niigata	2-1	Mito HollyHock	Niigata Stadium
JST (UTC+09)

17 October 2001 38	Yokohama FC	0-1	Albirex Niigata	Yokohama Mitsuzawa Stadium
JST (UTC+09)

20 October 2001 39	Albirex Niigata	4-1	Ventforet Kofu	Niigata Stadium
JST (UTC+09)

28 October 2001 40	Sagan Tosu	0-1	Albirex Niigata	Tosu Stadium
JST (UTC+09)

3 November 2001 41	Albirex Niigata	2-3 (GG) (a.e.t.)	Kyoto Purple Sanga	Niigata Stadium
JST (UTC+09)

6 November 2001 42	Montedio Yamagata	2-1 (GG) (a.e.t.)	Albirex Niigata	Yamagata Park Stadium
JST (UTC+09)

10 November 2001 43	Kawasaki Frontale	1-2	Albirex Niigata	Machida Athletic Stadium
JST (UTC+09)

18 November 2001 44	Albirex Niigata	3-2 (GG) (a.e.t.)	Shonan Bellmare	Niigata Stadium
JST (UTC+09)

=== Emperor's Cup ===
25 November 2001 1st Round	Mind House TC	1-3	Albirex Niigata	Suzuka Sports Garden
JST (UTC+09)

2 December 2001 2nd Round	Albirex Niigata	2-1 (GG) (a.e.t.)	Tochigi SC	Niigata City Athletic Stadium
JST (UTC+09)

9 December 2001 3rd Round	Avispa Fukuoka	2-3 (GG) (a.e.t.)	Albirex Niigata	Hakatanomori Football Stadium
JST (UTC+09)

16 December 2001 4th Round	Gamba Osaka	1-0	Albirex Niigata	Tottori Soccer Stadium
JST (UTC+09)

=== J.League Cup ===
4 April 2001 1st Round-1	Albirex Niigata	0-2	Sanfrecce Hiroshima	Niigata City Athletic Stadium
JST (UTC+09)

18 April 2001 1st Round-2	Sanfrecce Hiroshima	2-0 (4-0 agg.)	Albirex Niigata	Hiroshima Stadium
JST (UTC+09)

== Player statistics ==
No.	Pos.	Nat.	Player	D.o.B. (Age)	Height / Weight	J.League 2		Emperor's Cup		J.League Cup		Total	
No.	Pos.	Nat.	Player	D.o.B. (Age)	Height / Weight	Apps	Goals	Apps	Goals	Apps	Goals	Apps	Goals
1	GK	(Japan)	Koichi Kidera	April 4, 1972 (aged 28)	cm / kg	0	0						
2	DF	(Japan)	Keiichiro Nakano	March 29, 1976 (aged 24)	cm / kg	2	0						
3	DF	(Brazil)	Sérgio	September 19, 1975 (aged 25)	cm / kg	35	4						
4	DF	(Japan)	Nobuhiro Shiba	April 18, 1974 (aged 26)	cm / kg	7	0						
5	DF	(Japan)	Katsuo Kanda	June 21, 1966 (aged 34)	cm / kg	32	0						
6	MF	(Japan)	Tadahiro Akiba	October 13, 1975 (aged 25)	cm / kg	43	0						
7	MF	(Japan)	Yoshito Terakawa	September 6, 1974 (aged 26)	cm / kg	42	11						
8	MF	(Brazil)	Souza	May 29, 1977 (aged 23)	cm / kg	0	0						
8	MF	(Brazil)	Marquinho	March 7, 1976 (aged 25)	cm / kg	26	1						
9	MF	(Japan)	Shingo Suzuki	March 20, 1978 (aged 22)	cm / kg	42	16						
10	FW	(Brazil)	Lindomar	November 20, 1977 (aged 23)	cm / kg	3	0						
10	FW	(Brazil)	Andradina	September 13, 1974 (aged 26)	cm / kg	18	6						
11	FW	(Japan)	Hisashi Kurosaki	May 8, 1968 (aged 32)	cm / kg	44	21						
12	DF	(Japan)	Naotaka Takeda	July 13, 1978 (aged 22)	cm / kg	1	0						
13	DF	(Japan)	Kenji Arai	May 19, 1978 (aged 22)	cm / kg	20	0						
14	DF	(Japan)	Naoki Takahashi	August 8, 1976 (aged 24)	cm / kg	40	1						
15	MF	(Japan)	Isao Homma	April 19, 1981 (aged 19)	cm / kg	11	1						
16	MF	(Japan)	Takamichi Kobayashi	January 3, 1979 (aged 22)	cm / kg	4	0						
17	FW	(Japan)	Masayuki Onishi	July 5, 1977 (aged 23)	cm / kg	13	0						
18	DF	(Japan)	Takayuki Nishigaya	May 12, 1973 (aged 27)	cm / kg	37	0						
19	DF	(Japan)	Kohei Inoue	October 5, 1978 (aged 22)	cm / kg	35	0						
20	GK	(Japan)	Nobuhiro Maeda	June 3, 1973 (aged 27)	cm / kg	0	0						
21	GK	(Japan)	Yosuke Nozawa	November 9, 1979 (aged 21)	cm / kg	44	0						
22	MF	(Japan)	Taichi Hasegawa	February 26, 1981 (aged 20)	cm / kg	5	0						
23	MF	(Japan)	Masahiro Fukazawa	July 12, 1977 (aged 23)	cm / kg	41	1						
24	FW	(Japan)	Ryoji Ujihara	May 10, 1981 (aged 19)	cm / kg	41	15						
25	MF	(Japan)	Shigeru Ubukata	November 15, 1978 (aged 22)	cm / kg	0	0						
26	MF	(Japan)	Satoru Kobayashi	August 26, 1973 (aged 27)	cm / kg	13	1						

== Other pages ==
- (in Japanese) J. League official site
