= 2000 Albirex Niigata season =

Albirex Niigata
2000 season
- Manager: Yoshikazu Nagai
- Stadium: Niigata City Athletic Stadium
- J.League 2: 7th
- Emperor's Cup: 3rd Round
- J.League Cup: 1st Round
- Top goalscorer: Naoki Naruo (17)
- Average home league attendance: 4,007
| Home colours | Away colours |

2000 Albirex Niigata season

== Competitions ==
| Competitions | Position |
|---|---|
| J.League 2 | 7th / 11 clubs |
| Emperor's Cup | 3rd round |
| J.League Cup | 1st round |

== Domestic results ==
=== J.League 2 ===
| 12 March 2000 1 | Omiya Ardija | 2–1 | Albirex Niigata | Omiya Football Stadium |
| JST (UTC+09) |

| 19 March 2000 2 | Sagan Tosu | 2–1 | Albirex Niigata | Tosu Stadium |
| JST (UTC+09) |

| 26 March 2000 3 | Albirex Niigata | 3–2 | Ventforet Kofu | Niigata City Athletic Stadium |
| JST (UTC+09) |

| 30 March 2000 4 | Consadole Sapporo | 3–0 | Albirex Niigata | Muroran Irie Stadium |
| JST (UTC+09) |

| 5 | bye |

| 9 April 2000 6 | Albirex Niigata | 1–3 | Vegalta Sendai | Niigata City Athletic Stadium |
| JST (UTC+09) |

| 16 April 2000 7 | Urawa Red Diamonds | 5–1 | Albirex Niigata | Urawa Komaba Stadium |
| JST (UTC+09) |

| 23 April 2000 8 | Albirex Niigata | 0–3 | Oita Trinita | Niigata City Athletic Stadium |
| JST (UTC+09) |

| 29 April 2000 9 | Montedio Yamagata | 1–2 (GG) (a.e.t.) | Albirex Niigata | Yamagata Park Stadium |
| JST (UTC+09) |

| 4 May 2000 10 | Albirex Niigata | 0–1 | Mito HollyHock | Niigata City Athletic Stadium |
| JST (UTC+09) |

| 7 May 2000 11 | Shonan Bellmare | 1–2 (GG) (a.e.t.) | Albirex Niigata | Hiratsuka Athletics Stadium |
| JST (UTC+09) |

| 13 May 2000 12 | Albirex Niigata | 0–2 | Omiya Ardija | Niigata City Athletic Stadium |
| JST (UTC+09) |

| 18 May 2000 13 | Albirex Niigata | 0–0 (GG) (a.e.t.) | Sagan Tosu | Niigata City Athletic Stadium |
| JST (UTC+09) |

| 21 May 2000 14 | Ventforet Kofu | 1–2 | Albirex Niigata | Kose Sports Park Stadium |
| JST (UTC+09) |

| 27 May 2000 15 | Albirex Niigata | 0–1 | Consadole Sapporo | Niigata City Athletic Stadium |
| JST (UTC+09) |

| 16 | bye |

| 4 June 2000 17 | Vegalta Sendai | 4–2 | Albirex Niigata | Sendai Stadium |
| JST (UTC+09) |

| 10 June 2000 18 | Albirex Niigata | 6–1 | Urawa Red Diamonds | Niigata City Athletic Stadium |
| JST (UTC+09) |

| 17 June 2000 19 | Oita Trinita | 2–3 | Albirex Niigata | Oita Athletic Stadium |
| JST (UTC+09) |

| 21 June 2000 20 | Albirex Niigata | 4–0 | Montedio Yamagata | Niigata City Athletic Stadium |
| JST (UTC+09) |

| 25 June 2000 21 | Mito HollyHock | 1–0 (GG) (a.e.t.) | Albirex Niigata | Hitachi Athletic Stadium |
| JST (UTC+09) |

| 1 July 2000 22 | Albirex Niigata | 1–0 | Shonan Bellmare | Niigata City Athletic Stadium |
| JST (UTC+09) |

| 9 July 2000 23 | Consadole Sapporo | 2–1 (GG) (a.e.t.) | Albirex Niigata | Sapporo Atsubetsu Park Stadium |
| JST (UTC+09) |

| 24 | bye |

| 29 July 2000 25 | Albirex Niigata | 0–2 | Vegalta Sendai | Niigata City Athletic Stadium |
| JST (UTC+09) |

| 2 August 2000 26 | Urawa Red Diamonds | 3–1 | Albirex Niigata | Urawa Komaba Stadium |
| JST (UTC+09) |

| 5 August 2000 27 | Albirex Niigata | 2–1 (GG) (a.e.t.) | Oita Trinita | Niigata City Athletic Stadium |
| JST (UTC+09) |

| 12 August 2000 28 | Montedio Yamagata | 0–1 | Albirex Niigata | Yamagata Park Stadium |
| JST (UTC+09) |

| 18 August 2000 29 | Albirex Niigata | 1–1 (GG) (a.e.t.) | Mito HollyHock | Niigata City Athletic Stadium |
| JST (UTC+09) |

| 27 August 2000 30 | Shonan Bellmare | 1–2 | Albirex Niigata | Hiratsuka Athletics Stadium |
| JST (UTC+09) |

| 2 September 2000 31 | Albirex Niigata | 1–2 | Omiya Ardija | Niigata City Athletic Stadium |
| JST (UTC+09) |

| 10 September 2000 32 | Sagan Tosu | 2–2 (GG) (a.e.t.) | Albirex Niigata | Tosu Stadium |
| JST (UTC+09) |

| 15 September 2000 33 | Albirex Niigata | 0–1 | Ventforet Kofu | Niigata City Athletic Stadium |
| JST (UTC+09) |

| 34 | bye |

| 28 September 2000 35 | Vegalta Sendai | 2–1 | Albirex Niigata | Sendai Stadium |
| JST (UTC+09) |

| 1 October 2000 36 | Albirex Niigata | 4–2 | Urawa Red Diamonds | Niigata City Athletic Stadium |
| JST (UTC+09) |

| 5 October 2000 37 | Oita Trinita | 2–1 | Albirex Niigata | Oita Athletic Stadium |
| JST (UTC+09) |

| 14 October 2000 38 | Albirex Niigata | 1–0 | Montedio Yamagata | Niigata City Athletic Stadium |
| JST (UTC+09) |

| 22 October 2000 39 | Mito HollyHock | 1–1 (GG) (a.e.t.) | Albirex Niigata | Hitachinaka City Stadium |
| JST (UTC+09) |

| 28 October 2000 40 | Albirex Niigata | 3–2 (GG) (a.e.t.) | Shonan Bellmare | Niigata City Athletic Stadium |
| JST (UTC+09) |

| 5 November 2000 41 | Omiya Ardija | 2–1 | Albirex Niigata | Omiya Football Stadium |
| JST (UTC+09) |

| 11 November 2000 42 | Albirex Niigata | 1–0 | Sagan Tosu | Niigata City Athletic Stadium |
| JST (UTC+09) |

| 16 November 2000 43 | Ventforet Kofu | 0–0 (GG) (a.e.t.) | Albirex Niigata | Kose Sports Park Stadium |
| JST (UTC+09) |

| 19 November 2000 44 | Albirex Niigata | 1–2 | Consadole Sapporo | Niigata City Athletic Stadium |
| JST (UTC+09) |

=== Emperor's Cup ===
| 25 November 2000 1st Round | Teihens | 1–5 | Albirex Niigata | Kanazawa Soccer Stadium |
| JST (UTC+09) |

| 3 December 2000 2nd Round | Albirex Niigata | 2–0 | Kunimi High School | Niigata City Athletic Stadium |
| JST (UTC+09) |

| 10 December 2000 3rd Round | Verdy Kawasaki | 2–1 | Albirex Niigata | Hiratsuka Athletics Stadium |
| JST (UTC+09) |

=== J.League Cup ===
| 12 April 2000 1st Round-1 | Albirex Niigata | 0–1 | Kyoto Purple Sanga | Niigata City Athletic Stadium |
| JST (UTC+09) |

| 19 April 2000 1st Round-2 | Kyoto Purple Sanga | 3–1 (4–1 agg.) | Albirex Niigata | Nishikyogoku Athletic Stadium |
| JST (UTC+09) |

== Player statistics ==
| No. | Pos. | Nat. | Player | D.o.B. (Age) | Height / Weight | J.League 2 | | Emperor's Cup | | J.League Cup | | Total | |
| No. | Pos. | Nat. | Player | D.o.B. (Age) | Height / Weight | Apps | Goals | Apps | Goals | Apps | Goals | Apps | Goals |
|---|---|---|---|---|---|---|---|---|---|---|---|---|---|
| 1 | GK | (Japan) | Shinya Yoshihara | April 19, 1978 (aged 21) | cm / kg | 22 | 0 | | | | | | |
| 2 | DF | (Japan) | Masanori Kizawa | June 2, 1969 (aged 30) | cm / kg | 39 | 0 | | | | | | |
| 3 | DF | (Brazil) | Sérgio | September 19, 1975 (aged 24) | cm / kg | 29 | 1 | | | | | | |
| 4 | DF | (Japan) | Nobuhiro Shiba | April 18, 1974 (aged 25) | cm / kg | 25 | 0 | | | | | | |
| 5 | DF | (Japan) | Katsuo Kanda | June 21, 1966 (aged 33) | cm / kg | 32 | 3 | | | | | | |
| 6 | MF | (Japan) | Tadahiro Akiba | October 13, 1975 (aged 24) | cm / kg | 32 | 1 | | | | | | |
| 7 | MF | (Japan) | Katsutoshi Domori | June 29, 1976 (aged 23) | cm / kg | 24 | 1 | | | | | | |
| 8 | FW | (Brazil) | Nascimento | October 21, 1979 (aged 20) | cm / kg | 31 | 10 | | | | | | |
| 9 | FW | (Japan) | Hiroki Hattori | August 30, 1971 (aged 28) | cm / kg | 17 | 2 | | | | | | |
| 10 | MF | (Brazil) | Marco Tulio | February 28, 1981 (aged 19) | cm / kg | 8 | 0 | | | | | | |
| 11 | FW | (Japan) | Naoki Naruo | October 5, 1974 (aged 25) | cm / kg | 36 | 17 | | | | | | |
| 12 | DF | (Japan) | Keiichiro Nakano | March 29, 1976 (aged 23) | cm / kg | 35 | 0 | | | | | | |
| 13 | MF | (Japan) | Yoshito Terakawa | September 6, 1974 (aged 25) | cm / kg | 36 | 3 | | | | | | |
| 14 | DF | (Japan) | Naoki Takahashi | August 8, 1976 (aged 23) | cm / kg | 35 | 0 | | | | | | |
| 15 | MF | (Japan) | Isao Homma | April 19, 1981 (aged 18) | cm / kg | 29 | 3 | | | | | | |
| 16 | MF | (Japan) | Takamichi Kobayashi | January 3, 1979 (aged 21) | cm / kg | 3 | 0 | | | | | | |
| 17 | MF | (Japan) | Shingo Suzuki | March 20, 1978 (aged 21) | cm / kg | 40 | 11 | | | | | | |
| 18 | MF | (Japan) | Takayoshi Shikida | November 25, 1977 (aged 22) | cm / kg | 24 | 0 | | | | | | |
| 19 | DF | (Japan) | Kohei Inoue | October 5, 1978 (aged 21) | cm / kg | 20 | 0 | | | | | | |
| 20 | GK | (Japan) | Koichi Kidera | April 4, 1972 (aged 27) | cm / kg | 18 | 0 | | | | | | |
| 21 | FW | (Japan) | Yosuke Nozawa | November 9, 1979 (aged 20) | cm / kg | 0 | 0 | | | | | | |
| 22 | MF | (Japan) | Taichi Hasegawa | February 26, 1981 (aged 19) | cm / kg | 1 | 0 | | | | | | |
| 23 | MF | (Japan) | Masahiro Fukazawa | July 12, 1977 (aged 22) | cm / kg | 13 | 1 | | | | | | |
