= 1999 Yokohama F. Marinos season =

Yokohama F. Marinos
1999 season
- Manager: De la Cruz
- Stadium: International Stadium Yokohama
- J.League 1: 5th
- Emperor's Cup: Quarterfinals
- J.League Cup: Quarterfinals
- Top goalscorer: Shoji Jo (18)
- Average home league attendance: 20,095
Home colours	Away colours

1999 Yokohama F. Marinos season

== Competitions ==
Competitions	Position
J.League 1	5th / 16 clubs
Emperor's Cup	Quarterfinals
J.League Cup	Quarterfinals

== Domestic results ==
=== J.League 1 ===
6 March 1999 1-1	Yokohama F. Marinos	2-0	Bellmare Hiratsuka	International Stadium Yokohama
JST (UTC+09)

13 March 1999 1-2	Kyoto Purple Sanga	1-3	Yokohama F. Marinos	Nishikyogoku Athletic Stadium
JST (UTC+09)

20 March 1999 1-3	Yokohama F. Marinos	0-1	Kashiwa Reysol	International Stadium Yokohama
JST (UTC+09)

27 March 1999 1-4	Avispa Fukuoka	2-1	Yokohama F. Marinos	Hakatanomori Football Stadium
JST (UTC+09)

3 April 1999 1-5	Shimizu S-Pulse	2-3	Yokohama F. Marinos	Nihondaira Sports Stadium
JST (UTC+09)

10 April 1999 1-6	Yokohama F. Marinos	6-0	Cerezo Osaka	International Stadium Yokohama
JST (UTC+09)

17 April 1999 1-7	Júbilo Iwata	1-0	Yokohama F. Marinos	Júbilo Iwata Stadium
JST (UTC+09)

24 April 1999 1-8	Yokohama F. Marinos	3-3 (GG) (a.e.t.)	Kashima Antlers	International Stadium Yokohama
JST (UTC+09)

28 April 1999 1-9	Urawa Red Diamonds	1-2 (GG) (a.e.t.)	Yokohama F. Marinos	Urawa Komaba Stadium
JST (UTC+09)

1 May 1999 1-10	Yokohama F. Marinos	4-3 (GG) (a.e.t.)	Nagoya Grampus Eight	International Stadium Yokohama
JST (UTC+09)

5 May 1999 1-11	Gamba Osaka	1-0	Yokohama F. Marinos	Osaka Expo '70 Stadium
JST (UTC+09)

8 May 1999 1-12	Yokohama F. Marinos	4-1	JEF United Ichihara	International Stadium Yokohama
JST (UTC+09)

15 May 1999 1-13	Vissel Kobe	1-0	Yokohama F. Marinos	Kobe Universiade Memorial Stadium
JST (UTC+09)

22 May 1999 1-14	Yokohama F. Marinos	3-2	Sanfrecce Hiroshima	International Stadium Yokohama
JST (UTC+09)

29 May 1999 1-15	Verdy Kawasaki	1-0 (GG) (a.e.t.)	Yokohama F. Marinos	Tokyo National Stadium
JST (UTC+09)

6 August 1999 2-1	Yokohama F. Marinos	3-0	Júbilo Iwata	International Stadium Yokohama
JST (UTC+09)

14 August 1999 2-2	Kashima Antlers	2-3	Yokohama F. Marinos	Kashima Soccer Stadium
JST (UTC+09)

18 August 1999 2-3	Yokohama F. Marinos	2-0	Urawa Red Diamonds	International Stadium Yokohama
JST (UTC+09)

21 August 1999 2-4	Nagoya Grampus Eight	2-2 (GG) (a.e.t.)	Yokohama F. Marinos	Mizuho Rugby Stadium
JST (UTC+09)

28 August 1999 2-5	Yokohama F. Marinos	3-0	Gamba Osaka	Niigata City Athletic Stadium
JST (UTC+09)

4 September 1999 2-6	JEF United Ichihara	2-3 (GG) (a.e.t.)	Yokohama F. Marinos	Ichihara Seaside Stadium
JST (UTC+09)

11 September 1999 2-7	Yokohama F. Marinos	0-1	Vissel Kobe	International Stadium Yokohama
JST (UTC+09)

15 September 1999 2-8	Sanfrecce Hiroshima	2-1	Yokohama F. Marinos	Hiroshima Big Arch
JST (UTC+09)

18 September 1999 2-9	Yokohama F. Marinos	3-2 (GG) (a.e.t.)	Verdy Kawasaki	International Stadium Yokohama
JST (UTC+09)

23 September 1999 2-10	Bellmare Hiratsuka	0-2	Yokohama F. Marinos	Hiratsuka Athletics Stadium
JST (UTC+09)

30 October 1999 2-11	Kashiwa Reysol	1-1 (GG) (a.e.t.)	Yokohama F. Marinos	Kashiwanoha Park Stadium
JST (UTC+09)

17 November 1999 2-12	Yokohama F. Marinos	2-0	Kyoto Purple Sanga	International Stadium Yokohama
JST (UTC+09)

20 November 1999 2-13	Cerezo Osaka	1-2	Yokohama F. Marinos	Osaka Nagai Stadium
JST (UTC+09)

23 November 1999 2-14	Yokohama F. Marinos	1-2	Shimizu S-Pulse	International Stadium Yokohama
JST (UTC+09)

27 November 1999 2-15	Yokohama F. Marinos	2-0	Avispa Fukuoka	International Stadium Yokohama
JST (UTC+09)

=== Emperor's Cup ===
1st Round	bye

2nd Round	bye

12 December 1999 3rd Round	Yokohama F. Marinos	2-1	Mito HollyHock	Yokohama Mitsuzawa Stadium
JST (UTC+09)

19 December 1999 4th Round	Yokohama F. Marinos	2-1	Gamba Osaka	Tottori Soccer Stadium
JST (UTC+09)

23 December 1999 Quarterfinals	Yokohama F. Marinos	0-1	Verdy Kawasaki	International Stadium Yokohama
JST (UTC+09)

=== J.League Cup ===
7 April 1999 1st Round-1	Omiya Ardija	1-1	Yokohama F. Marinos	Omiya Football Stadium
JST (UTC+09)

14 April 1999 1st Round-2	Yokohama F. Marinos	3-0 (4-1 agg.)	Omiya Ardija	Yokohama Mitsuzawa Stadium
JST (UTC+09)

12 June 1999 2nd Round-1	Sanfrecce Hiroshima	2-3	Yokohama F. Marinos	Hiroshima Big Arch
JST (UTC+09)

19 June 1999 2nd Round-2	Yokohama F. Marinos	1-0 (4-2 agg.)	Sanfrecce Hiroshima	Kagawa Marugame Stadium
JST (UTC+09)

20 July 1999 Quarterfinals-1	Yokohama F. Marinos	0-3	FC Tokyo	International Stadium Yokohama
JST (UTC+09)

24 July 1999 Quarterfinals-2	FC Tokyo	0-2 (3-2 agg.)	Yokohama F. Marinos	Edogawa Stadium
JST (UTC+09)

== Player statistics ==
No.	Pos.	Nat.	Player	D.o.B. (Age)	Height / Weight	J.League 1		Emperor's Cup		J.League Cup		Total	
No.	Pos.	Nat.	Player	D.o.B. (Age)	Height / Weight	Apps	Goals	Apps	Goals	Apps	Goals	Apps	Goals
1	GK	(Japan)	Yoshikatsu Kawaguchi	August 15, 1975 (aged 23)	cm / kg	28	0						
2	DF	(Japan)	Katsuo Kanda	June 21, 1966 (aged 32)	cm / kg	11	0						
3	DF	(Japan)	Naoki Matsuda	March 14, 1977 (aged 21)	cm / kg	27	0						
4	DF	(Japan)	Masami Ihara	September 18, 1967 (aged 31)	cm / kg	25	0						
5	DF	(Japan)	Norio Omura	September 6, 1969 (aged 29)	cm / kg	27	3						
6	MF	(Japan)	Yoshiharu Ueno	April 21, 1973 (aged 25)	cm / kg	28	3						
7	MF	(Japan)	Hideki Nagai	January 26, 1971 (aged 28)	cm / kg	22	5						
8	MF	(South Korea)	Yoo Sang-Chul	October 18, 1971 (aged 27)	cm / kg	22	7						
9	MF	(Japan)	Atsuhiro Miura	July 24, 1974 (aged 24)	cm / kg	29	2						
10	MF	(Japan)	Shunsuke Nakamura	June 24, 1978 (aged 20)	cm / kg	26	7						
11	FW	(Japan)	Shoji Jo	June 17, 1975 (aged 23)	cm / kg	25	18						
12	DF	(Japan)	Yasuhiro Hato	May 4, 1976 (aged 22)	cm / kg	19	1						
13	MF	(Japan)	Kunio Nagayama	September 16, 1970 (aged 28)	cm / kg	11	1						
14	MF	(Japan)	Kazuki Sato	June 27, 1974 (aged 24)	cm / kg	13	3						
15	DF	(Japan)	Yoshiaki Maruyama	October 12, 1974 (aged 24)	cm / kg	0	0						
16	GK	(Japan)	Tatsuya Enomoto	March 16, 1979 (aged 19)	cm / kg	0	0						
17	DF	(Japan)	Ryuji Michiki	August 25, 1973 (aged 25)	cm / kg	1	0						
17/30	FW	(Japan)	Ryosuke Kijima	May 29, 1979 (aged 19)	cm / kg	2	0						
18	MF	(Japan)	Akihiro Endō	September 18, 1975 (aged 23)	cm / kg	29	4						
19	FW	(Japan)	Takayuki Yoshida	March 14, 1977 (aged 21)	cm / kg	14	1						
20	DF	(Japan)	Kazunari Okayama	April 24, 1978 (aged 20)	cm / kg	4	0						
20	FW	(Croatia)	Igor Jovićević	November 30, 1973 (aged 25)	cm / kg	1	0						
21	GK	(Japan)	Hideaki Ozawa	March 17, 1974 (aged 24)	cm / kg	2	0						
22	MF	(Japan)	Seiji Koga	August 7, 1979 (aged 19)	cm / kg	2	0						
23	DF	(Japan)	Hiroyuki Tazawa	April 29, 1978 (aged 20)	cm / kg	0	0						
24	DF	(Japan)	Jun Ideguchi	May 14, 1979 (aged 19)	cm / kg	2	0						
25	MF	(Japan)	Shintaro Harada	November 8, 1980 (aged 18)	cm / kg	0	0						
26	MF	(Japan)	Kazuhiro Murakami	January 20, 1981 (aged 18)	cm / kg	0	0						
27	MF	(Japan)	Daisuke Hoshi	December 10, 1980 (aged 18)	cm / kg	0	0						
28	FW	(Japan)	Yoichi Mori	August 1, 1980 (aged 18)	cm / kg	0	0						
29	MF	(Japan)	Masahiro Fukazawa	July 12, 1977 (aged 21)	cm / kg	6	2						
30	FW	(Brazil)	Válber Costa	December 6, 1971 (aged 27)	cm / kg	17	4						
31	GK	(Japan)	Go Kaburaki	August 26, 1977 (aged 21)	cm / kg	0	0						
32	MF	(Japan)	Masahiro Ōhashi	June 23, 1981 (aged 17)	cm / kg	2	0						

== Other pages ==
- (in Japanese) J.League official site
