= 1999 Albirex Niigata season =

Albirex Niigata
1999 season
- Manager: Yoshikazu Nagai
- Stadium: Niigata City Athletic Stadium
- J.League 2: 4th
- Emperor's Cup: 3rd Round
- J.League Cup: 1st Round
- Top goalscorer: Naoki Naruo (8); Shingo Suzuki (8)
- Average home league attendance: 4,211
Home colours	Away colours

1999 Albirex Niigata season

== Competitions ==
Competitions	Position
J.League 2	4th / 10 clubs
Emperor's Cup	3rd round
J.League Cup	1st round

== Domestic results ==
=== J.League 2 ===
14 March 1999 1	Kawasaki Frontale	0-1	Albirex Niigata	Todoroki Athletics Stadium
JST (UTC+09)

20 March 1999 2	Albirex Niigata	1-0	Montedio Yamagata	Niigata City Athletic Stadium
JST (UTC+09)

28 March 1999 3	FC Tokyo	0-1	Albirex Niigata	Nishigaoka Soccer Stadium
JST (UTC+09)

4 April 1999 4	Albirex Niigata	6-1	Ventforet Kofu	Niigata City Athletic Stadium
JST (UTC+09)

11 April 1999 5	Consadole Sapporo	0-1	Albirex Niigata	Muroran Irie Stadium
JST (UTC+09)

18 April 1999 6	Albirex Niigata	3-1	Omiya Ardija	Niigata City Athletic Stadium
JST (UTC+09)

25 April 1999 7	Sagan Tosu	0-1	Albirex Niigata	Tosu Stadium
JST (UTC+09)

28 April 1999 8	Albirex Niigata	0-3	Vegalta Sendai	Niigata City Athletic Stadium
JST (UTC+09)

2 May 1999 9	Oita Trinita	1-0	Albirex Niigata	Oita Athletic Stadium
JST (UTC+09)

5 May 1999 10	Montedio Yamagata	3-0	Albirex Niigata	Yamagata Park Stadium
JST (UTC+09)

9 May 1999 11	Albirex Niigata	2-0	FC Tokyo	Niigata City Athletic Stadium
JST (UTC+09)

16 May 1999 12	Ventforet Kofu	3-0	Albirex Niigata	Kose Sports Park Stadium
JST (UTC+09)

22 May 1999 13	Albirex Niigata	0-1	Consadole Sapporo	Niigata City Athletic Stadium
JST (UTC+09)

29 May 1999 14	Omiya Ardija	1-0	Albirex Niigata	Omiya Football Stadium
JST (UTC+09)

28 June 1999 15	Albirex Niigata	5-2	Sagan Tosu	Niigata City Athletic Stadium
JST (UTC+09)

4 July 1999 16	Vegalta Sendai	0-3	Albirex Niigata	Sendai Stadium
JST (UTC+09)

11 July 1999 17	Albirex Niigata	0-2	Oita Trinita	Niigata City Athletic Stadium
JST (UTC+09)

15 July 1999 18	Albirex Niigata	0-2	Kawasaki Frontale	Niigata City Athletic Stadium
JST (UTC+09)

1 August 1999 19	FC Tokyo	0-2	Albirex Niigata	Edogawa Stadium
JST (UTC+09)

7 August 1999 20	Albirex Niigata	1-1 (GG) (a.e.t.)	Consadole Sapporo	Niigata City Athletic Stadium
JST (UTC+09)

15 August 1999 21	Kawasaki Frontale	0-1	Albirex Niigata	Todoroki Athletics Stadium
JST (UTC+09)

19 August 1999 22	Albirex Niigata	1-1 (GG) (a.e.t.)	Ventforet Kofu	Niigata City Athletic Stadium
JST (UTC+09)

29 August 1999 23	Omiya Ardija	3-1	Albirex Niigata	Omiya Football Stadium
JST (UTC+09)

4 September 1999 24	Albirex Niigata	0-1 (GG) (a.e.t.)	Vegalta Sendai	Niigata City Athletic Stadium
JST (UTC+09)

11 September 1999 25	Albirex Niigata	1-0	Sagan Tosu	Niigata City Athletic Stadium
JST (UTC+09)

15 September 1999 26	Oita Trinita	0-1	Albirex Niigata	Oita Athletic Stadium
JST (UTC+09)

18 September 1999 27	Albirex Niigata	1-3	Montedio Yamagata	Niigata City Athletic Stadium
JST (UTC+09)

26 September 1999 28	Consadole Sapporo	1-2	Albirex Niigata	Sapporo Atsubetsu Park Stadium
JST (UTC+09)

2 October 1999 29	Albirex Niigata	1-4	Kawasaki Frontale	Niigata City Athletic Stadium
JST (UTC+09)

11 October 1999 30	Ventforet Kofu	0-2	Albirex Niigata	Kose Sports Park Stadium
JST (UTC+09)

18 October 1999 31	Albirex Niigata	0-1	Omiya Ardija	Niigata City Athletic Stadium
JST (UTC+09)

24 October 1999 32	Vegalta Sendai	0-1	Albirex Niigata	Sendai Stadium
JST (UTC+09)

31 October 1999 33	Sagan Tosu	1-2 (GG) (a.e.t.)	Albirex Niigata	Saga Stadium
JST (UTC+09)

6 November 1999 34	Albirex Niigata	2-1 (GG) (a.e.t.)	Oita Trinita	Niigata City Athletic Stadium
JST (UTC+09)

14 November 1999 35	Montedio Yamagata	2-3 (GG) (a.e.t.)	Albirex Niigata	Yamagata Park Stadium
JST (UTC+09)

21 November 1999 36	Albirex Niigata	0-1	FC Tokyo	Niigata City Athletic Stadium
JST (UTC+09)

=== Emperor's Cup ===
28 November 1999 1st Round	F.C. Primeiro	0-2	Albirex Niigata	Koriyama West Soccer Stadium
JST (UTC+09)

5 December 1999 2nd Round	Albirex Niigata	1-0	National Institute of Fitness and Sports in Kanoya Club	Niigata City Athletic Stadium
JST (UTC+09)

12 December 1999 3rd Round	Urawa Red Diamonds	3-1	Albirex Niigata	Urawa Komaba Stadium
JST (UTC+09)

=== J.League Cup ===
7 April 1999 1st Round-1	Albirex Niigata	0-3	Kashiwa Reysol	Niigata City Athletic Stadium
JST (UTC+09)

14 April 1999 1st Round-2	Kashiwa Reysol	2-0 (5-0 agg.)	Albirex Niigata	Hitachi Kashiwa Soccer Stadium
JST (UTC+09)

== Player statistics ==
No.	Pos.	Nat.	Player	D.o.B. (Age)	Height / Weight	J.League 2		Emperor's Cup		J.League Cup		Total	
No.	Pos.	Nat.	Player	D.o.B. (Age)	Height / Weight	Apps	Goals	Apps	Goals	Apps	Goals	Apps	Goals
1	GK	(Japan)	Koichi Kidera	April 4, 1972 (aged 26)	cm / kg	14	0						
2	DF	(Japan)	Masanori Kizawa	June 2, 1969 (aged 29)	cm / kg	32	2						
3	DF	(Brazil)	Sérgio	September 19, 1975 (aged 23)	cm / kg	24	1						
4	DF	(Japan)	Nobuhiro Shiba	April 18, 1974 (aged 24)	cm / kg	33	2						
5	DF	(Japan)	Shinichi Fujita	April 10, 1973 (aged 25)	cm / kg	12	0						
6	MF	(Japan)	Jun Mizukoshi	January 15, 1975 (aged 24)	cm / kg	35	2						
7	MF	(Japan)	Haruki Seto	March 14, 1978 (aged 21)	cm / kg	36	5						
8	MF	(Japan)	Noriaki Tsutsui	August 15, 1976 (aged 22)	cm / kg	20	0						
9	FW	(Brazil)	Ricardo Higa	May 4, 1973 (aged 25)	cm / kg	34	6						
10	FW	(Brazil)	Saulo	April 11, 1974 (aged 24)	cm / kg	23	6						
11	FW	(Japan)	Naoki Naruo	October 5, 1974 (aged 24)	cm / kg	36	8						
12	DF	(Japan)	Keiichiro Nakano	March 29, 1976 (aged 22)	cm / kg	29	0						
13	DF	(Japan)	Teruki Tabata	April 16, 1979 (aged 19)	cm / kg	2	0						
14	DF	(Japan)	Naoki Takahashi	August 8, 1976 (aged 22)	cm / kg	20	1						
15	MF	(Japan)	Makoto Ikeda	July 8, 1977 (aged 21)	cm / kg	2	0						
16	MF	(Japan)	Takamichi Kobayashi	January 3, 1979 (aged 20)	cm / kg	4	0						
17	MF	(Japan)	Shingo Suzuki	March 20, 1978 (aged 20)	cm / kg	30	8						
18	MF	(Japan)	Shusuke Shimada	July 10, 1976 (aged 22)	cm / kg	24	1						
19	FW	(Japan)	Takeshi Kawaharazuka	February 1, 1975 (aged 24)	cm / kg	3	0						
20	GK	(Japan)	Shinya Yoshihara	April 19, 1978 (aged 20)	cm / kg	22	0						
21	GK	(Japan)	Tomonori Tsunematsu	July 16, 1976 (aged 22)	cm / kg	2	0						
22	MF	(Japan)	Tadahiro Akiba	October 13, 1975 (aged 23)	cm / kg	35	0						
23	MF	(Japan)	Taichi Hasegawa	February 26, 1981 (aged 18)	cm / kg	3	0						
24	MF	(Japan)	Takayoshi Shikida	November 25, 1977 (aged 21)	cm / kg	12	3						

== Other pages ==
- (in Japanese) J. League official site
