= Naoki Takahashi =

Japanese footballer

Naoki Takahashi 高橋 直樹
Personal information
- Date of birth: August 8, 1976 (age 50)
- Place of birth: Fukuoka, Japan
- Height: 1.78 m (5 ft 10 in)
- Position: Defender

Youth career
- 1992–1994: Tokai University Daigo High School
- 1995–1998: Fukuoka University

Senior career*
Years	Team	Apps	(Gls)
1999–2005	Albirex Niigata	141	(4)
Total		141	(4)
- * Club domestic league appearances and goals

Naoki Takahashi (高橋 直樹, Takahashi Naoki; born August 8, 1976) is a former Japanese football player.

== Playing career ==
Takahashi was born in Fukuoka Prefecture on August 8, 1976. After graduating from Fukuoka University, he joined newly was promoted to J2 League club, Albirex Niigata in 1999. He became a regular player in July 1999 and played many matches as center back with Sérgio. However his opportunity to play decreased behind new member Yoshiaki Maruyama from 2002. The club won the champions in 2003 and was promoted to J1 League from 2004. Although he played many matches again in 2005, he retired at the end of the 2005 season.

== Career statistics ==
Appearances and goals by club, season and competition
Club	Season	League			Emperor's Cup		J.League Cup		Total	
Club	Season	Division	Apps	Goals	Apps	Goals	Apps	Goals	Apps	Goals
Albirex Niigata	1999	J2 League	20	1	3	1	0	0	23	2
Albirex Niigata	2000	J2 League	35	0	3	0	2	0	40	0
Albirex Niigata	2001	J2 League	40	1	4	0	2	0	46	1
Albirex Niigata	2002	J2 League	14	1	1	0	—		15	1
Albirex Niigata	2003	J2 League	6	0	3	0	—		9	0
Albirex Niigata	2004	J1 League	6	1	0	0	3	0	9	1
Albirex Niigata	2005	J1 League	20	0	1	0	4	0	25	0
Career total			141	4	15	1	11	0	167	5
