= 2003 Albirex Niigata season =

Albirex Niigata
2003 season
- Manager: Yasuharu Sorimachi
- Stadium: Niigata Stadium
- J. League 2: 1st
- Emperor's Cup: 4th Round
- Top goalscorer: Marcus (32)
- Average home league attendance: 30,339
Home colours	Away colours

This page lists statistics from the 2003 season of the Albirex Niigata football team.

== Competitions ==
Competitions	Position
J. League 2	1st / 12 clubs
Emperor's Cup	4th Round

== Domestic results ==
=== J. League 2 ===
Match	Date	Venue	Opponents	Score
1	2003.3.16	Saitama Stadium 2002	Omiya Ardija	4-1
2	2003.3.22	Niigata City Athletic Stadium	Avispa Fukuoka	4-0
3	2003.3.29	Mitsuzawa Stadium	Yokohama F.C.	0-1
4	2003.4.5	Niigata City Athletic Stadium	Consadole Sapporo	0-1
5	2003.4.9	Kose Sports Stadium	Ventforet Kofu	3-1
6	2003.4.12	Niigata City Athletic Stadium	Sanfrecce Hiroshima	1-2
7	2003.4.20	Hiratsuka Athletics Stadium	Shonan Bellmare	2-1
8	2003.4.26	Niigata City Athletic Stadium	Kawasaki Frontale	1-0
9	2003.4.29	Yamagata Park Stadium	Montedio Yamagata	0-1
10	2003.5.5	Niigata Stadium	Mito HollyHock	2-2
11	2003.5.10	Tosu Stadium	Sagan Tosu	1-0
12	2003.5.14	Niigata City Athletic Stadium	Omiya Ardija	4-0
13	2003.5.17	Hakata no mori stadium	Avispa Fukuoka	2-1
14	2003.5.24	Niigata City Athletic Stadium	Yokohama F.C.	2-1
15	2003.5.31	Sapporo Dome	Consadole Sapporo	0-2
16	2003.6.7	Kasamatsu Stadium	Mito HollyHock	1-0
17	2003.6.14	Niigata Stadium	Sagan Tosu	2-1
18	2003.6.18	Todoroki Athletics Stadium	Kawasaki Frontale	4-0
19	2003.6.21	Niigata Stadium	Shonan Bellmare	1-0
20	2003.6.28	Hiroshima Big Arch	Sanfrecce Hiroshima	0-0
21	2003.7.2	Niigata Stadium	Ventforet Kofu	0-0
22	2003.7.5	Niigata Stadium	Montedio Yamagata	1-1
23	2003.7.19	Tosu Stadium	Sagan Tosu	1-0
24	2003.7.26	Niigata Stadium	Avispa Fukuoka	3-2
25	2003.7.30	Ōmiya Park Soccer Stadium	Omiya Ardija	2-0
26	2003.8.2	Niigata Stadium	Consadole Sapporo	5-1
27	2003.8.10	Niigata Stadium	Mito HollyHock	0-0
28	2003.8.16	Hiratsuka Athletics Stadium	Shonan Bellmare	0-0
29	2003.8.23	Niigata Stadium	Sanfrecce Hiroshima	3-1
30	2003.8.30	Matsumoto Stadium	Ventforet Kofu	1-2
31	2003.9.3	Niigata City Athletic Stadium	Kawasaki Frontale	3-2
32	2003.9.6	Yamagata Park Stadium	Montedio Yamagata	2-1
33	2003.9.13	Fukushima (ja:福島県営あづま陸上競技場)	Yokohama F.C.	7-1
34	2003.9.20	Niigata Stadium	Shonan Bellmare	2-1
35	2003.9.23	Hiroshima Big Arch	Sanfrecce Hiroshima	0-1
36	2003.9.27	Niigata Stadium	Sagan Tosu	2-1
37	2003.10.4	Todoroki Athletics Stadium	Kawasaki Frontale	0-3
38	2003.10.11	Niigata Stadium	Montedio Yamagata	4-1
39	2003.10.18	Kasamatsu Stadium	Mito HollyHock	0-1
40	2003.10.26	Niigata Stadium	Ventforet Kofu	2-0
41	2003.11.1	Sapporo Atsubetsu Park Stadium	Consadole Sapporo	2-2
42	2003.11.8	Niigata Stadium	Yokohama F.C.	4-2
43	2003.11.15	Hakata no mori stadium	Avispa Fukuoka	1-2
44	2003.11.23	Niigata Stadium	Omiya Ardija	1-0

=== Emperor's Cup ===
Match	Date	Venue	Opponents	Score
1st Round	2003..	[[]]	[[]]	-
2nd Round	2003..	[[]]	[[]]	-
3rd Round	2003..	[[]]	[[]]	-
4th Round	2003..	[[]]	[[]]	-

== Player statistics ==
No.	Pos.	Player	D.o.B. (Age)	Height / Weight	J. League 2		Emperor's Cup		Total	
No.	Pos.	Player	D.o.B. (Age)	Height / Weight	Apps	Goals	Apps	Goals	Apps	Goals
1	GK	Koichi Kidera	April 4, 1972 (aged 30)	cm / kg	0	0				
2	DF	Yoshiaki Maruyama	October 12, 1974 (aged 28)	cm / kg	44	1				
3	DF	Anderson	December 22, 1972 (aged 30)	cm / kg	39	2				
4	DF	Koichi Sugiyama	October 27, 1971 (aged 31)	cm / kg	6	0				
5	DF	Katsuo Kanda	June 21, 1966 (aged 36)	cm / kg	17	0				
6	MF	Tadahiro Akiba	October 13, 1975 (aged 27)	cm / kg	39	0				
7	MF	Keisuke Kurihara	May 20, 1973 (aged 29)	cm / kg	15	0				
8	MF	Motohiro Yamaguchi	January 29, 1969 (aged 34)	cm / kg	42	4				
9	MF	Fabinho	June 26, 1973 (aged 29)	cm / kg	28	9				
10	MF	Marcus	February 25, 1974 (aged 29)	cm / kg	41	32				
11	FW	Yusaku Ueno	November 1, 1973 (aged 29)	cm / kg	41	13				
12	MF	Katsuyuki Miyazawa	September 15, 1976 (aged 26)	cm / kg	31	5				
13	DF	Kenji Arai	May 19, 1978 (aged 24)	cm / kg	4	0				
14	DF	Naoki Takahashi	August 8, 1976 (aged 26)	cm / kg	6	0				
15	MF	Isao Homma	April 19, 1981 (aged 21)	cm / kg	15	0				
16	MF	Ryuji Sueoka	May 22, 1979 (aged 23)	cm / kg	12	1				
17	MF	An Yong-Hak	October 25, 1978 (aged 24)	cm / kg	29	1				
18	DF	Masaya Karube	May 13, 1979 (aged 23)	cm / kg	0	0				
19	DF	Hikaru Mita	August 1, 1981 (aged 21)	cm / kg	35	0				
20	GK	Nobuhiro Maeda	June 3, 1973 (aged 29)	cm / kg	0	0				
21	GK	Yosuke Nozawa	November 9, 1979 (aged 23)	cm / kg	44	0				
22	GK	Takashi Kitano	October 4, 1982 (aged 20)	cm / kg	0	0				
23	MF	Masahiro Fukazawa	July 12, 1977 (aged 25)	cm / kg	41	1				
24	FW	Hiroshi Morita	May 18, 1978 (aged 24)	cm / kg	12	4				
25	MF	Mikito Nishihara	June 10, 1980 (aged 22)	cm / kg	0	0				
26	DF	Eiichiro Ozaki	December 7, 1984 (aged 18)	cm / kg	17	0				
27	FW	Issey Nakajima-Farran	May 16, 1984 (aged 18)	cm / kg	0	0				
28	FW	Yuzo Funakoshi	June 12, 1977 (aged 25)	cm / kg	22	4				
29	FW	Shoji Yamada	December 6, 1984 (aged 18)	cm / kg	0	0				
30	FW	Yasuhiro Tanaka	August 2, 1984 (aged 18)	cm / kg	0	0				
31	DF	Hayato Mizuki	November 1, 1984 (aged 18)	cm / kg	0	0				
32	DF	Tatsunori Yamagata	October 4, 1983 (aged 19)	cm / kg	6	1				
33	FW	Geílson	April 10, 1984 (aged 18)	cm / kg	2	0				
34	MF	Hidetoshi Wakui	February 12, 1983 (aged 20)	cm / kg	0	0				
35	DF	Kentaro Suzuki	June 2, 1980 (aged 22)	cm / kg	17	2				
36	MF	Makoto Atsuta	September 16, 1976 (aged 26)	cm / kg	1	0				

== Other pages ==
- (in Japanese) J. League official site
