= Ryoji Ujihara =

Japanese footballer

Ryoji Ujihara 氏原 良二
Personal information
- Full name: Ryoji Ujihara
- Date of birth: May 10, 1981 (age 45)
- Place of birth: Kagawa, Japan
- Height: 1.84 m (6 ft 1/2 in)
- Position: Forward

Youth career
- 1997–1999: Nagoya Grampus Eight

Senior career*
Years	Team	Apps	(Gls)
2000–2004	Nagoya Grampus Eight	6	(0)
2001–2002	→Albirex Niigata (loan)	75	(20)
2005	Sagan Tosu	20	(1)
2006	Montedio Yamagata	23	(2)
2007–2010	Thespa Kusatsu	59	(9)
Total		183	(32)
- * Club domestic league appearances and goals

Ryoji Ujihara (氏原 良二, Ujihara Ryōji; born May 10, 1981) is a former Japanese football player.

== Playing career ==
Ujihara was born in Kagawa Prefecture on May 10, 1981. He joined J1 League club Nagoya Grampus Eight from youth team in 2000. However, he could not play at all in the match. In 2001, he moved to J2 League club Albirex Niigata on loan. In 2001, he became a regular player and scored 15 goals. In 2002, he played many matches as substitute forward. In 2003, he returned to Nagoya Grampus Eight. However, he could not play many matches until 2004. In 2005, he moved to J2 club Sagan Tosu and played many matches. In 2006, he moved to J2 club Montedio Yamagata and played many matches. In 2007, he moved to J2 club Thespa Kusatsu. He played many matches as regular player in 2007. However, his opportunity to play decreased from 2008 and he retired end of 2010 season.

== Career statistics ==
Appearances and goals by club, season and competition
Club	Season	League			Emperor's Cup		J.League Cup		Total	
Club	Season	Division	Apps	Goals	Apps	Goals	Apps	Goals	Apps	Goals
Nagoya Grampus Eight	2000	J1 League	0	0	0	0	0	0	0	0
Albirex Niigata	2001	J2 League	41	15	3	3	2	0	46	18
Albirex Niigata	2002	J2 League	34	5	3	0	—		37	5
Nagoya Grampus Eight	2003	J1 League	4	0	1	0	1	0	6	0
Nagoya Grampus Eight	2004	J1 League	2	0	0	0	1	0	3	0
Sagan Tosu	2005	J2 League	20	1	1	0	—		21	1
Montedio Yamagata	2006	J2 League	23	2	1	0	—		24	2
Thespa Kusatsu	2007	J2 League	31	7	0	0	—		31	7
Thespa Kusatsu	2008	J2 League	11	1	0	0	—		11	1
Thespa Kusatsu	2009	J2 League	8	0	1	0	—		9	0
Thespa Kusatsu	2010	J2 League	9	1	0	0	—		9	1
Career total			183	32	10	3	4	0	197	35
