= 2004 Albirex Niigata season =

Albirex Niigata
2004 season
- Manager: Yasuharu Sorimachi
- Stadium: Niigata Stadium
- J. League 1: 10th
- Emperor's Cup: 4th Round
- J. League Cup: GL-B 3rd
- Top goalscorer: Edmilson (15)
- Average home league attendance: 37,689
| Home colours | Away colours |

During the 2004 season, Albirex Niigata competed in the J. League 1, in which they finished 10th. They also competed in the Emperor's Cup and the J. League Cup - they were eliminated in the fourth round of the former and in the group stage of the latter.

== Competitions ==
| Competitions | Position |
|---|---|
| J. League 1 | 10th / 16 clubs |
| Emperor's Cup | 4th Round |
| J. League Cup | GL-B 3rd / 4 clubs |

== Domestic results ==
=== J. League 1 ===
| Match | Date | Venue | Opponents | Score |
|---|---|---|---|---|
| 1-1 | 2004.3.13 | Ajinomoto Stadium | FC Tokyo | 1-0 |
| 1-2 | 2004.3.20 | Niigata Stadium | Vissel Kobe | 0-0 |
| 1-3 | 2004.4.4 | Kashiwanoha Stadium | Kashiwa Reysol | 1-2 |
| 1-4 | 2004.4.10 | Niigata Stadium | Yokohama F. Marinos | 1-3 |
| 1-5 | 2004.4.14 | Kashima Soccer Stadium | Kashima Antlers | 2-2 |
| 1-6 | 2004.4.18 | National Stadium | JEF United Ichihara | 2-1 |
| 1-7 | 2004.5.2 | Niigata Stadium | Tokyo Verdy 1969 | 0-1 |
| 1-8 | 2004.5.5 | Mizuho Athletic Stadium | Nagoya Grampus Eight | 1-1 |
| 1-9 | 2004.5.9 | Niigata Stadium | Urawa Red Diamonds | 0-3 |
| 1-10 | 2004.5.15 | Nagai Stadium | Cerezo Osaka | 1-2 |
| 1-11 | 2004.5.23 | Niigata Stadium | Júbilo Iwata | 1-2 |
| 1-12 | 2004.6.12 | Oita Stadium | Oita Stadium | 0-1 |
| 1-13 | 2004.6.16 | Niigata Stadium | Shimizu S-Pulse | 3-3 |
| 1-14 | 2004.6.19 | Hiroshima Big Arch | Sanfrecce Hiroshima | 1-1 |
| 1-15 | 2004.6.26 | Niigata Stadium | Gamba Osaka | 1-4 |
| 2-1 | 2004.8.14 | Ajinomoto Stadium | Tokyo Verdy 1969 | 2-0 |
| 2-2 | 2004.8.21 | Niigata Stadium | JEF United Ichihara | 3-3 |
| 2-3 | 2004.8.29 | Kobe Universiade Memorial Stadium | Vissel Kobe | 3-4 |
| 2-4 | 2004.9.12 | Niigata Stadium | Nagoya Grampus Eight | 0-0 |
| 2-5 | 2004.9.18 | Saitama Stadium 2002 | Urawa Red Diamonds | 4-1 |
| 2-6 | 2004.9.23 | Niigata Stadium | Sanfrecce Hiroshima | 3-2 |
| 2-7 | 2004.9.26 | Nihondaira Sports Stadium | Shimizu S-Pulse | 2-4 |
| 2-8 | 2004.10.2 | Niigata Stadium | Oita Trinita | 3-0 |
| 2-9 | 2004.10.17 | Niigata Stadium | Kashima Antlers | 1-0 |
| 2-10 | 2004.10.24 | Yamaha Stadium | Júbilo Iwata | 3-1 |
| 2-12 | 2004.11.6 | Osaka Expo '70 Stadium | Gamba Osaka | 6-3 |
| 2-11 | 2004.11.10 | National Stadium | Kashiwa Reysol | 1-3 |
| 2-13 | 2004.11.20 | Niigata Stadium | FC Tokyo | 4-2 |
| 2-14 | 2004.11.23 | International Stadium Yokohama | Yokohama F. Marinos | 1-2 |
| 2-15 | 2004.11.28 | Niigata Stadium | Cerezo Osaka | 1-2 |

=== Emperor's Cup ===
| Match | Date | Venue | Opponents | Score |
|---|---|---|---|---|
| 4th Round | 2004.11.13 | Hiratsuka Stadium | Shonan Bellmare | 3-2 |

=== J. League Cup ===
| Match | Date | Venue | Opponents | Score |
|---|---|---|---|---|
| GL-B-1 | 2004.3.27 | Yamaha Stadium | Júbilo Iwata | 0-0 |
| GL-B-2 | 2004.4.29 | Niigata Stadium | Gamba Osaka | 4-4 |
| GL-B-3 | 2004.5.29 | Mizuho Athletic Stadium | Nagoya Grampus Eight | 1-2 |
| GL-B-4 | 2004.6.5 | Niigata Stadium | Nagoya Grampus Eight | 0-1 |
| GL-B-5 | 2004.7.17 | Niigata Stadium | Júbilo Iwata | 1-1 |
| GL-B-6 | 2004.7.24 | Ishikawa Kanazawa Stadium | Gamba Osaka | 2-0 |

== Player statistics ==
| No. | Pos. | Player | D.o.B. (Age) | Height / Weight | J. League 1 | | Emperor's Cup | | J. League Cup | | Total | |
| No. | Pos. | Player | D.o.B. (Age) | Height / Weight | Apps | Goals | Apps | Goals | Apps | Goals | Apps | Goals |
|---|---|---|---|---|---|---|---|---|---|---|---|---|
| 1 | GK | Koichi Kidera | April 4, 1972 (aged 31) | cm / kg | 11 | 0 | | | | | | |
| 2 | DF | Yoshiaki Maruyama | October 12, 1974 (aged 29) | cm / kg | 19 | 0 | | | | | | |
| 3 | DF | Anderson | December 22, 1972 (aged 31) | cm / kg | 12 | 0 | | | | | | |
| 4 | DF | Kentaro Suzuki | June 2, 1980 (aged 23) | cm / kg | 8 | 0 | | | | | | |
| 5 | DF | Osamu Umeyama | August 16, 1973 (aged 30) | cm / kg | 7 | 0 | | | | | | |
| 6 | MF | Tadahiro Akiba | October 13, 1975 (aged 28) | cm / kg | 14 | 0 | | | | | | |
| 7 | MF | Keisuke Kurihara | May 20, 1973 (aged 30) | cm / kg | 11 | 0 | | | | | | |
| 8 | MF | Motohiro Yamaguchi | January 29, 1969 (aged 35) | cm / kg | 29 | 2 | | | | | | |
| 9 | MF | Fabinho | June 26, 1973 (aged 30) | cm / kg | 27 | 9 | | | | | | |
| 10 | FW | Edmilson | September 15, 1982 (aged 21) | cm / kg | 29 | 15 | | | | | | |
| 11 | FW | Yusaku Ueno | November 1, 1973 (aged 30) | cm / kg | 30 | 5 | | | | | | |
| 13 | MF | Toshiyuki Abe | August 1, 1974 (aged 29) | cm / kg | 0 | 0 | | | | | | |
| 14 | DF | Naoki Takahashi | August 8, 1976 (aged 27) | cm / kg | 6 | 1 | | | | | | |
| 15 | MF | Isao Homma | April 19, 1981 (aged 22) | cm / kg | 12 | 0 | | | | | | |
| 16 | MF | Yoshito Terakawa | September 6, 1974 (aged 29) | cm / kg | 27 | 0 | | | | | | |
| 17 | MF | An Yong-Hak | October 25, 1978 (aged 25) | cm / kg | 26 | 3 | | | | | | |
| 18 | MF | Shingo Suzuki | March 20, 1978 (aged 25) | cm / kg | 30 | 5 | | | | | | |
| 19 | DF | Hikaru Mita | August 1, 1981 (aged 22) | cm / kg | 10 | 0 | | | | | | |
| 20 | MF | Hiroyoshi Kuwabara | October 2, 1971 (aged 32) | cm / kg | 24 | 0 | | | | | | |
| 21 | GK | Yosuke Nozawa | November 9, 1979 (aged 24) | cm / kg | 19 | 0 | | | | | | |
| 22 | GK | Takashi Kitano | October 4, 1982 (aged 21) | cm / kg | 0 | 0 | | | | | | |
| 23 | MF | Masahiro Fukazawa | July 12, 1977 (aged 26) | cm / kg | 7 | 1 | | | | | | |
| 24 | FW | Hiroshi Morita | May 18, 1978 (aged 25) | cm / kg | 3 | 1 | | | | | | |
| 25 | MF | Katsuyuki Miyazawa | September 15, 1976 (aged 27) | cm / kg | 7 | 0 | | | | | | |
| 26 | MF | Akihiro Kurihara | May 2, 1985 (aged 18) | cm / kg | 0 | 0 | | | | | | |
| 27 | DF | Yuki Sakai | June 28, 1985 (aged 18) | cm / kg | 0 | 0 | | | | | | |
| 28 | FW | Yuzo Funakoshi | June 12, 1977 (aged 26) | cm / kg | 4 | 0 | | | | | | |
| 29 | DF | Yasushi Kita | April 25, 1978 (aged 25) | cm / kg | 17 | 0 | | | | | | |
| 31 | FW | Roberto | December 19, 1985 (aged 18) | cm / kg | 1 | 0 | | | | | | |
| 32 | MF | Tomokazu Hirama | June 30, 1977 (aged 26) | cm / kg | 1 | 0 | | | | | | |
| 33 | DF | Naoto Matsuo | September 10, 1979 (aged 24) | cm / kg | 11 | 1 | | | | | | |
| 34 | FW | Oséas | May 14, 1971 (aged 32) | cm / kg | 12 | 4 | | | | | | |

== Other pages ==
- (in Japanese) J. League official site
