= Shinya Yoshihara =

Japanese footballer (born 1978)

Shinya Yoshihara 吉原 慎也
Personal information
- Full name: Shinya Yoshihara
- Date of birth: April 19, 1978 (age 48)
- Place of birth: Hitachi, Ibaraki, Japan
- Height: 1.85 m (6 ft 1 in)
- Position: Goalkeeper

Youth career
- 1994–1996: Hitachi Technical High School

Senior career*
| Years | Team | Apps | (Gls) |
| 1997–2001 | Yokohama F. Marinos | 0 | (0) |
| 1999–2000 | →Albirex Niigata (loan) | 44 | (0) |
| 2001–2008 | Kawasaki Frontale | 106 | (0) |
| 2007 | →Tokyo Verdy (loan) | 13 | (0) |
| 2009 | Júbilo Iwata | 1 | (0) |
| 2010 | Kashiwa Reysol | 0 | (0) |
| Total | | 164 | (0) |
Medal record
Yokohama F. Marinos
| Winner | J.League Cup | 2001 |
Kawasaki Frontale
| Runner-up | J1 League | 2006 |
| Runner-up | J1 League | 2008 |
- * Club domestic league appearances and goals

Shinya Yoshihara (吉原 慎也, Yoshihara Shinya; born April 19, 1978) is a former Japanese football player.

He is married to well-known professional Go player Yukari Yoshihara (née Yukari Umezawa), who is known for her work in spreading and teaching Go, especially in the worldwide-distributed manga and anime series Hikaru no Go.

== Club career ==
When Yoshihara was in junior high school, he received a recommendation from his former teacher to play football at Ibaraki Prefectural Hitachi Technical High School, one of the most competitive teams in the prefecture. He played as a regular member from his first year on the team and contributed to leading his school to the All Japan High School Soccer Tournament. In his second and third years, Yoshihara was selected as a Kanto region all-star member as well as an all-Japan member for the U-18 division. He played with Takayuki Suzuki, two years his senior.

Following his graduation, Yoshihara began his professional career playing for Yokohama Marinos (later Yokohama F. Marinos), however, chances to play were scarce as Yoshikatsu Kawaguchi was appointed the primary goalkeeper at the time. In 1999, Yoshihara was loaned to Albirex Niigata, a J2 League club, where he was called to the starting lineup in the season-opening match. His amazing saves led the team to seven consecutive winning matches. In 2000, Yoshihara made appearances as a spokesperson in advertisements for Join and Toyopet Niigata which gained him recognition as a popular public figure in Niigata.

After Yoshihara returned to Yokohama F. Marinos in 2001, he made a permanent move to Kawasaki Frontale in midseason where he became the regular goalkeeper in 2003. He played in 44 full matches this season. The following year, he maintained a record of seven consecutive scoreless matches which greatly contributed to Kawasaki Frontale's promotion to J1 League, during which he established his position as an indispensable goalkeeper for the team.

In 2005, an injury prevented him from being called to the starting lineup in the season-opening match, yet he made his appearance from the game against Tokyo Verdy on and contributed to stopping the team from repetitive defeats. Yoshihara's position was taken by teammate Takashi Aizawa in midseason. However, at the end of 2006, during which Kawasaki Frontale was in close proximity to winning the championship, Yoshihara secured his primary position once again in the match against Sanfrecce Hiroshima. Although Kawasaki Frontale lost the championship, Yoshihara was one of the leading players in guiding the team to second place in J1 League, which qualified the team for the 2007 AFC Champions League.

In 2007, Yoshihara signed a loan deal with Tokyo Verdy. The team's losing streaks early in the season gained him chances to play, during which he rebuilt the defense line and put the team back on track. His position as the regular goalkeeper seemed promising, yet, Yoshihara was injured during a match against Sagan Tosu on July 1 in the 25th section, damaging his left knee posterior cruciate ligament. The injury took him out of action for 9 weeks, preventing Yoshihara from playing for the rest of the season. Tokyo Verdy was promoted to J1 that year.

After his loan season at Tokyo Verdy, Yoshihara returned to Kawasaki Frontale in 2008. However, with his repeated injuries and with National Team member Eiji Kawashima’s addition to the team, Yoshihara was only able to play one match in the J.League Cup.

In 2009, Yoshihara moved to Júbilo Iwata on a season-long loan. He made his debut in the third round of the Emperor's Cup followed by a match against Vissel Kobe in J1’s final section. In 2010, he joined Kashiwa Reysol but on July 14th, he announced his retirement from professional football.

== Characteristics ==
•Yoshihara is fluent in Korean. He was close to Júbilo Iwata’s Korean striker Lee Keun-ho and to Kawasaki Frontale’s North Korean striker Jong Tae-se.

== Club statistics ==
| Club performance | | | League | | Cup | | League Cup | | Total | |
| Season | Club | League | Apps | Goals | Apps | Goals | Apps | Goals | Apps | Goals |
| Japan | | | League | | Emperor's Cup | | J.League Cup | | Total | |
|---|---|---|---|---|---|---|---|---|---|---|
| 1997 | Yokohama Marinos | J1 League | 0 | 0 | 0 | 0 | 0 | 0 | 0 | 0 |
| 1998 | Yokohama Marinos | J1 League | 0 | 0 | 0 | 0 | 0 | 0 | 0 | 0 |
| 1999 | Albirex Niigata | J2 League | 22 | 0 | 3 | 0 | 2 | 0 | 27 | 0 |
| 2000 | Albirex Niigata | J2 League | 22 | 0 | 0 | 0 | 0 | 0 | 22 | 0 |
| 2001 | Yokohama F. Marinos | J1 League | 0 | 0 | 0 | 0 | 0 | 0 | 0 | 0 |
| 2001 | Kawasaki Frontale | J2 League | 0 | 0 | 2 | 0 | 0 | 0 | 2 | 0 |
| 2002 | Kawasaki Frontale | J2 League | 2 | 0 | 5 | 0 | - | | 7 | 0 |
| 2003 | Kawasaki Frontale | J2 League | 44 | 0 | 4 | 0 | - | | 48 | 0 |
| 2004 | Kawasaki Frontale | J2 League | 41 | 0 | 1 | 0 | - | | 42 | 0 |
| 2005 | Kawasaki Frontale | J1 League | 9 | 0 | 0 | 0 | 2 | 0 | 11 | 0 |
| 2006 | Kawasaki Frontale | J1 League | 10 | 0 | 2 | 0 | 1 | 0 | 13 | 0 |
| 2007 | Tokyo Verdy | J2 League | 13 | 0 | 1 | 0 | - | | 14 | 0 |
| 2008 | Kawasaki Frontale | J1 League | 0 | 0 | 0 | 0 | 1 | 0 | 1 | 0 |
| 2009 | Júbilo Iwata | J1 League | 1 | 0 | 1 | 0 | 0 | 0 | 2 | 0 |
| 2010 | Kashiwa Reysol | J2 League | 0 | 0 | 0 | 0 | - | | 0 | 0 |
| Career total | | | 164 | 0 | 19 | 0 | 6 | 0 | 189 | 0 |
