= 2010 Kashiwa Reysol season =

Kashiwa Reysol
2010 season
- Manager: Nelsinho
- Stadium: Hitachi Kashiwa Soccer Stadium
- J. League 2: 1st
- Emperor's Cup: 4th Round
- Top goalscorer: Leandro Domingues (13)

2010 Kashiwa Reysol season

== Competitions ==
Competitions	Position
J. League 2	1st / 19 clubs
Emperor's Cup	4th Round

== Player statistics ==
No.	Pos.	Player	D.o.B. (Age)	Height / Weight	J. League 2		Emperor's Cup		Total	
No.	Pos.	Player	D.o.B. (Age)	Height / Weight	Apps	Goals	Apps	Goals	Apps	Goals
1	GK	Kazushige Kirihata	June 30, 1987 (aged 22)	cm / kg	2	0				
2	DF	Hirofumi Watanabe	July 7, 1987 (aged 22)	cm / kg	2	0				
3	DF	Naoya Kondo	October 3, 1983 (aged 26)	cm / kg	34	3				
4	MF	Alceu	May 7, 1984 (aged 25)	cm / kg	6	0				
5	DF	Masahiro Koga	September 8, 1978 (aged 31)	cm / kg	0	0				
6	DF	Park Dong-Hyuk	April 18, 1979 (aged 30)	cm / kg	34	4				
7	MF	Hidekazu Otani	November 6, 1984 (aged 25)	cm / kg	35	2				
8	FW	Masakatsu Sawa	January 12, 1983 (aged 27)	cm / kg	26	2				
9	FW	Hideaki Kitajima	May 23, 1978 (aged 31)	cm / kg	17	4				
10	FW	França	March 2, 1976 (aged 34)	cm / kg	4	3				
11	MF	Leandro Domingues	August 24, 1983 (aged 26)	cm / kg	32	13				
13	DF	Yuzo Kobayashi	November 15, 1985 (aged 24)	cm / kg	29	0				
14	MF	Yuki Otsu	March 24, 1990 (aged 19)	cm / kg	9	1				
15	MF	Minoru Suganuma	May 16, 1985 (aged 24)	cm / kg	6	0				
16	GK	Shinya Yoshihara	April 19, 1978 (aged 31)	cm / kg	0	0				
16	GK	Koji Inada	June 19, 1985 (aged 24)	cm / kg	0	0				
17	FW	Ryohei Hayashi	September 8, 1986 (aged 23)	cm / kg	24	10				
18	FW	Junya Tanaka	July 15, 1987 (aged 22)	cm / kg	24	6				
19	FW	Masato Kudo	May 6, 1990 (aged 19)	cm / kg	27	10				
20	MF	Akimi Barada	May 30, 1991 (aged 18)	cm / kg	26	3				
21	GK	Takanori Sugeno	May 3, 1984 (aged 25)	cm / kg	35	0				
22	DF	Wataru Hashimoto	September 14, 1986 (aged 23)	cm / kg	29	0				
23	DF	Yohei Kurakawa	August 10, 1977 (aged 32)	cm / kg	15	1				
24	MF	Kosuke Taketomi	September 23, 1990 (aged 19)	cm / kg	1	1				
25	DF	Yusuke Murakami	April 27, 1984 (aged 25)	cm / kg	7	1				
26	MF	Masato Yamazaki	May 12, 1990 (aged 19)	cm / kg	8	1				
27	MF	Ren Sengoku	October 2, 1990 (aged 19)	cm / kg	1	0				
28	MF	Ryoichi Kurisawa	September 5, 1982 (aged 27)	cm / kg	31	0				
29	MF	Kohei Higa	April 30, 1990 (aged 19)	cm / kg	0	0				
30	DF	Hiroki Sakai	April 12, 1990 (aged 19)	cm / kg	9	1				
31	GK	Goro Kawanami	April 30, 1991 (aged 18)	cm / kg	0	0				
33	FW	Efrain Rintaro	July 23, 1991 (aged 18)	cm / kg	0	0				
34	MF	Koki Mizuno	September 6, 1985 (aged 24)	cm / kg	1	0				
35	FW	Roger	January 7, 1985 (aged 25)	cm / kg	12	3				

== Other pages ==
- (in Japanese) J. League official site
