= 2005 Albirex Niigata season =

Albirex Niigata
2005 season
- Manager: Yasuharu Sorimachi
- Stadium: Niigata Stadium
- J. League 1: 12th
- Emperor's Cup: 5th Round
- J. League Cup: GL-A 3rd
- Top goalscorer: Edmilson (18)
- Average home league attendance: 40,114
Home colours	Away colours

During the 2005 season, Albirex Niigata competed in the J. League 1, in which they finished 12th.

== Competitions ==
Competitions	Position
J. League 1	12th / 18 clubs
Emperor's Cup	5th Round
J. League Cup	GL-A 3rd / 4 clubs

== Domestic results ==
=== J. League 1 ===
Pos	Team	Pld	W	D	L	GF	GA	GD	Pts
10	FC Tokyo	34	11	14	9	43	40	+3	47
11	Oita Trinita	34	12	7	15	44	43	+1	43
12	Albirex Niigata	34	11	9	14	47	62	−15	42
13	Omiya Ardija	34	12	5	17	39	50	−11	41
14	Nagoya Grampus Eight	34	10	9	15	43	49	−6	39

Updated to match(es) played on December 3, 2005. Source: J. League Division 1
Rules for classification: 1) points; 2) goal difference; 3) number of goals scored.

Match	Date	Venue	Opponents	Score
1	2005..			-
2	2005..			-
3	2005..			-
4	2005..			-
5	2005..			-
6	2005..			-
7	2005..			-
8	2005..			-
9	2005..			-
10	2005..			-
11	2005..			-
12	2005..			-
13	2005..			-
14	2005..			-
15	2005..			-
16	2005..			-
17	2005..			-
18	2005..			-
19	2005..			-
20	2005..			-
21	2005..			-
22	2005..			-
23	2005..			-
24	2005..			-
25	2005..			-
26	2005..			-
27	2005..			-
28	2005..			-
29	2005..			-
30	2005..			-
31	2005..			-
32	2005..			-
33	2005..			-
34	2005..			-

=== Emperor's Cup ===
Match	Date	Venue	Opponents	Score
4th Round	2005..			-
5th Round	2005..			-

=== J. League Cup ===
Match	Date	Venue	Opponents	Score
GL-A-1	2005..			-
GL-A-2	2005..			-
GL-A-3	2005..			-
GL-A-4	2005..			-
GL-A-5	2005..			-
GL-A-6	2005..			-

== Player statistics ==
No.	Pos.	Player	D.o.B. (Age)	Height / Weight	J. League 1		Emperor's Cup		J. League Cup		Total	
No.	Pos.	Player	D.o.B. (Age)	Height / Weight	Apps	Goals	Apps	Goals	Apps	Goals	Apps	Goals
1	GK	Koichi Kidera	April 4, 1972 (aged 32)	cm / kg	8	0						
2	DF	Yoshiaki Maruyama	October 12, 1974 (aged 30)	cm / kg	11	0						
3	DF	Shigenori Hagimura	July 31, 1976 (aged 28)	cm / kg	28	0						
4	DF	Kentaro Suzuki	June 2, 1980 (aged 24)	cm / kg	7	0						
5	DF	Osamu Umeyama	August 16, 1973 (aged 31)	cm / kg	15	0						
6	MF	Hiroyoshi Kuwabara	October 2, 1971 (aged 33)	cm / kg	22	1						
7	DF	Ânderson Lima	March 18, 1973 (aged 31)	cm / kg	30	8						
8	MF	Motohiro Yamaguchi	January 29, 1969 (aged 36)	cm / kg	12	0						
9	MF	Fabinho	June 26, 1973 (aged 31)	cm / kg	26	8						
10	FW	Edmilson	September 15, 1982 (aged 22)	cm / kg	33	18						
11	FW	Yusaku Ueno	November 1, 1973 (aged 31)	cm / kg	34	2						
13	MF	Katsuyuki Miyazawa	September 15, 1976 (aged 28)	cm / kg	2	0						
14	DF	Naoki Takahashi	August 8, 1976 (aged 28)	cm / kg	20	0						
15	MF	Isao Homma	April 19, 1981 (aged 23)	cm / kg	28	0						
16	MF	Yoshito Terakawa	September 6, 1974 (aged 30)	cm / kg	31	0						
17	DF	Kojiro Kaimoto	October 14, 1977 (aged 27)	cm / kg	6	0						
18	MF	Shingo Suzuki	March 20, 1978 (aged 26)	cm / kg	29	4						
19	DF	Keiji Kaimoto	November 26, 1972 (aged 32)	cm / kg	20	1						
20	MF	Tetsuya Okayama	August 27, 1973 (aged 31)	cm / kg	12	0						
21	GK	Yosuke Nozawa	November 9, 1979 (aged 25)	cm / kg	26	0						
22	GK	Takashi Kitano	October 4, 1982 (aged 22)	cm / kg	0	0						
23	MF	Ryuji Sueoka	May 22, 1979 (aged 25)	cm / kg	5	0						
24	FW	Kosei Nakamura	April 5, 1981 (aged 23)	cm / kg	0	0						
25	MF	Daisuke Aono	September 19, 1979 (aged 25)	cm / kg	16	0						
26	MF	Masashi Otani	April 17, 1983 (aged 21)	cm / kg	0	0						
27	FW	Kazuhisa Kawahara	January 29, 1987 (aged 18)	cm / kg	0	0						
28	FW	Yuzo Funakoshi	June 12, 1977 (aged 27)	cm / kg	7	1						
29	DF	Yasushi Kita	April 25, 1978 (aged 26)	cm / kg	17	3						
30	GK	Yudai Suwa	May 5, 1986 (aged 18)	cm / kg	0	0						
31	DF	Daisuke Fujii	October 15, 1986 (aged 18)	cm / kg	5	0						
32	DF	Hideya Tanaka	June 25, 1986 (aged 18)	cm / kg	0	0						
33	MF	Shogo Yoshizawa	July 26, 1986 (aged 18)	cm / kg	0	0						
34	FW	Neto	October 29, 1985 (aged 19)	cm / kg	1	0						
35	MF	Atomu Tanaka	October 4, 1987 (aged 17)	cm / kg	2	0						
36	MF	Naoya Kikuchi	November 24, 1984 (aged 20)	cm / kg	15	1						
37	DF	Kazuhiko Chiba	June 21, 1985 (aged 19)	cm / kg	0	0						
39	FW	Marcel Sacramento	August 24, 1987 (aged 17)	cm / kg	0	0						

== Other pages ==
- (in Japanese) J. League official site
