= Keiichiro Nakano =

Japanese footballer

Keiichiro Nakano 中野 圭一郎
Personal information
- Full name: Keiichiro Nakano
- Date of birth: March 29, 1976 (age 50)
- Place of birth: Marugame, Kagawa, Japan
- Height: 1.71 m (5 ft 7 1/2 in)
- Position: Defender

Youth career
- 1991–1993: Takamatsu Commercial High School
- 1994–1997: National Institute of Fitness and Sports in Kanoya

Senior career*
Years	Team	Apps	(Gls)
1998–2001	Albirex Niigata	92	(1)
2002–2003	Japan Soccer College		
Total		92	(1)
- * Club domestic league appearances and goals

Keiichiro Nakano (中野 圭一郎, Nakano Keiichiro; born March 29, 1976) is a former Japanese football player.

== Playing career ==
Nakano was born in Marugame on March 29, 1976. After graduating from National Institute of Fitness and Sports in Kanoya, he joined Japan Football League club Albirex Niigata in 1998. He became a regular player as left side back from first season. The club was promoted to new league J2 League from 1999. Although he played many matches until 2000, he could not play many matches in 2001. In 2002, he moved to Prefectural Leagues club Japan Soccer College. The club was promoted to Regional Leagues from 2003. He retired at the end of the 2003 season.

== Career statistics ==
Appearances and goals by club, season and competition
Club	Season	League			Emperor's Cup		J.League Cup		Total	
Club	Season	Division	Apps	Goals	Apps	Goals	Apps	Goals	Apps	Goals
Albirex Niigata	1998	Football League	26	1					26	1
Albirex Niigata	1999	J2 League	29	0			2	0	31	0
Albirex Niigata	2000	J2 League	35	0			2	0	37	0
Albirex Niigata	2001	J2 League	2	0			0	0	2	0
Career total			92	1	0	0	4	0	96	1
