= Naoki Naruo =

Japanese footballer and manager (born 1974)

Naoki Naruo 鳴尾 直軌
Personal information
- Full name: Naoki Naruo
- Date of birth: October 5, 1974 (age 52)
- Place of birth: Iwaizumi, Iwate, Japan
- Height: 1.74 m (5 ft 9 in)
- Position: Forward

Youth career
- 1990–1992: Morioka High School

College career
Years	Team	Apps	(Gls)
1993–1996	Iwate University		

Senior career*
Years	Team	Apps	(Gls)
1997	Montedio Yamagata	12	(5)
1998	Sony Sendai	28	(13)
1999–2000	Albirex Niigata	72	(25)
2001–2002	Júbilo Iwata	0	(0)
2002	Sanfrecce Hiroshima	3	(0)
2003–2004	Sagan Tosu	48	(5)
Total		163	(48)

Managerial career
- 2006–2007: Albirex Niigata Ladies
- 2009: Albirex Niigata Singapore
- 2011–2015: Grulla Morioka
- 2016: Albirex Niigata Singapore
- 2017: Albirex Niigata U-18
Medal record
Júbilo Iwata
Winner	J1 League	2002
Runner-up	J1 League	2001
Runner-up	J.League Cup	2001
- * Club domestic league appearances and goals

Naoki Naruo (鳴尾 直軌, Naruo Naoki; born October 5, 1974) is a former Japanese football player and manager.

== Playing career ==
Naruo was born in Iwaizumi, Iwate on October 5, 1974. After graduating from Iwate University, he joined Japan Football League (JFL) club Montedio Yamagata in 1997. He played many matches as forward. In 1998, he moved to JFL club Sony Sendai. He became a regular player and scored 13 goals. In 1999, he moved to newly was promoted to J2 League club, Albirex Niigata. He played as central player in the club in 2 seasons. In 2001, he moved to J1 League club Júbilo Iwata. However he could not play at all in the match. In June 2002, he moved to Sanfrecce Hiroshima. However he could hardly play in the match and the club was relegated to J2 from 2003. In 2003, he moved to J2 club Sagan Tosu. He played as regular player in 2003. However his opportunity to play decreased in 2004 and he retired end of 2004 season.

== Coaching career ==
Naruo first coached Albirex Niigata Singapore in S.League in 2009, ending the season in seventh position. He then went back to Japan to coach Grulla Morioka based in his local for five years, leading the club to ascend from semi-professional Regional Leagues to a J3 League team. Naruo rejoined Albirex Niigata Singapore in 2016, replacing Tatsuyuki Okuyama. He led the White Swans to an unprecedented sweep of all four of the league's major trophies. This led to him being named the 2016 S.League Coach of the Year. 2 days after winning the award, Naruo announced that he is leaving the newly crowned champions.

== Career statistics ==
Appearances and goals by club, season and competition
Club	Season	League			Emperor's Cup		J.League Cup		Total	
Club	Season	Division	Apps	Goals	Apps	Goals	Apps	Goals	Apps	Goals
Montedio Yamagata	1997	Football League	12	5	0	0	—		12	5
Sony Sendai	1998	Football League	28	13	2	1	—		30	14
Albirex Niigata	1999	J2 League	36	8	3	0	2	0	41	8
Albirex Niigata	2000	J2 League	36	17	1	0	2	0	39	17
Júbilo Iwata	2001	J1 League	0	0	0	0	0	0	0	0
Júbilo Iwata	2002	J1 League	0	0	0	0	0	0	0	0
Sanfrecce Hiroshima	2002	J1 League	3	0	0	0	0	0	3	0
Sagan Tosu	2003	J2 League	38	5	1	0	—		39	5
Sagan Tosu	2004	J2 League	10	0	0	0	—		10	0
Career total			163	48	7	1	4	0	174	49

== Managerial statistics ==
Team	From	To	Record				
Team	From	To	G	W	D	L	Win %
Grulla Morioka	2014	2015	69	20	20	29	28.99
Albirex Niigata Singapore	2016	2016	24	16	2	6	66.67
Total			93	36	22	35	38.71
