= Saulo (footballer, born 1974) =

Brazilian footballer

Personal information
- Full name: Saulo Estevao da Costa Pimenta
- Date of birth: April 11, 1974 (age 52)
- Place of birth: Brazil
- Position: Forward

Senior career*
Years	Team	Apps	(Gls)
1999	Albirex Niigata	23	(6)
- * Club domestic league appearances and goals

Saulo Estevao da Costa Pimenta (born April 11, 1974) is a former Brazilian football player.

== Career statistics ==
Appearances and goals by club, season and competition
Club	Season	League			Emperor's Cup		J.League Cup		Total	
Club	Season	Division	Apps	Goals	Apps	Goals	Apps	Goals	Apps	Goals
Albirex Niigata	1999	J2 League	23	6			2	0	25	6
Career total			23	6	0	0	2	0	25	6
