= Hikaru Mita =

Japanese footballer

Hikaru Mita 三田 光
Personal information
- Full name: Hikaru Mita
- Date of birth: August 1, 1981 (age 45)
- Place of birth: Tokyo, Japan
- Height: 1.81 m (5 ft 11 1/2 in)
- Position: Defender

Youth career
- 1997–1999: Kokugakuin Univ. Kugayama High School

Senior career*
Years	Team	Apps	(Gls)
2000–2001	FC Tokyo	0	(0)
2002–2007	Albirex Niigata	103	(1)
2005	→Vegalta Sendai (loan)	7	(1)
2008	Shonan Bellmare	17	(1)
2009–2010	Tokushima Vortis	49	(1)
2011–2012	FC Gifu	44	(0)
Total		220	(4)
Medal record
Representing Japan
Asian Games
Silver medal – second place	2002 Busan	Team
- * Club domestic league appearances and goals

Hikaru Mita (三田 光, Mita Hikaru; born August 1, 1981) is a former Japanese football player.

== Playing career ==
Mita was born in Tokyo on August 1, 1981. After graduating from high school, he joined newly was promoted to J1 League club, FC Tokyo in 2000. However he could not play at all in the match in 2 seasons. In 2002, he moved to J2 League club Albirex Niigata. Although he became a regular player as left side back until April, he lost regular position behind Katsuo Kanda from May and played many matches as substitute. In 2003, he became a regular player as left side back and right side back. The club also won the champions in 2003 and was promoted to J1 from 2004. However he lost regular position and his opportunity to play decreased in 2004. In 2005, he moved to J2 club Vegalta Sendai on loan. However he could hardly play in the match. In 2006, he returned to Albirex Niigata. He became a regular player as right side back again in 2006. However his opportunity to play decreased in 2007. In 2008, he moved to J2 club Shonan Bellmare. Although he played many matches as side back in early 2008, he could hardly play in the match from the middle of 2008. In 2009, he moved to J2 club Tokushima Vortis. He played many matches as regular right side back in 2009. However his opportunity to play decreased in 2010. In 2011, he moved to J2 club FC Gifu. He became a regular player as defensive midfielder in 2011. However his opportunity to play decreased in 2012 and he retired end of 2012 season.

== Club statistics ==
Club	Season	League		Emperor's Cup		J.League Cup		Total	
Club	Season	Apps	Goals	Apps	Goals	Apps	Goals	Apps	Goals
FC Tokyo	2000	0	0	0	0	0	0	0	0
FC Tokyo	2001	0	0	0	0	0	0	0	0
Albirex Niigata	2002	30	0	2	0	-		32	0
Albirex Niigata	2003	35	0	4	0	-		39	0
Albirex Niigata	2004	10	0	0	0	1	0	11	0
Vegalta Sendai	2005	7	1	1	0	-		8	1
Albirex Niigata	2006	24	1	1	1	4	0	29	2
Albirex Niigata	2007	4	0	0	0	0	0	4	0
Shonan Bellmare	2008	17	1	1	0	-		18	1
Tokushima Vortis	2009	36	1	0	0	-		36	1
Tokushima Vortis	2010	13	0	1	0	-		14	0
FC Gifu	2011	32	0	0	0	-		32	0
FC Gifu	2012	12	0	0	0	-		12	0
Total		220	4	10	1	5	0	235	5
