= Takayoshi Shikida =

Japanese footballer (born 1977)

Takayoshi Shikida 式田 高義
Personal information
- Full name: Takayoshi Shikida
- Date of birth: November 25, 1977 (age 48)
- Place of birth: Chiba, Japan
- Height: 1.68 m (5 ft 6 in)
- Position: Midfielder

Youth career
- 1993–1995: Funabashi High School
- 1998–1999: Chuo Gakuin University

Senior career*
| Years | Team | Apps | (Gls) |
| 1996–1997 | JEF United Ichihara | 20 | (0) |
| 1999–2000 | Albirex Niigata | 36 | (3) |
| Total | | 56 | (3) |
- * Club domestic league appearances and goals

Takayoshi Shikida (式田 高義, Shikida Takayoshi; born November 25, 1977) is a former Japanese football player.

== Playing career ==
Shikida was born in Chiba Prefecture on November 25, 1977. After graduating from high school, he joined his local club JEF United Ichihara in 1996 and played as right side midfielder in 2 seasons. Through Chuo Gakuin University, he joined newly was promoted to J2 League club, Albirex Niigata. Although he played many matches in 2 seasons, he retired end of 2000 season.

== Career statistics ==
Appearances and goals by club, season and competition
| Club | Season | League | | | Emperor's Cup | | J.League Cup | | Total | |
| Club | Season | Division | Apps | Goals | Apps | Goals | Apps | Goals | Apps | Goals |
|---|---|---|---|---|---|---|---|---|---|---|
| JEF United Ichihara | 1996 | J1 League | 6 | 0 | 0 | 0 | 4 | 0 | 10 | 0 |
| JEF United Ichihara | 1997 | J1 League | 14 | 0 | 0 | 0 | 4 | 0 | 18 | 0 |
| Albirex Niigata | 1999 | J2 League | 12 | 3 | 0 | 0 | 0 | 0 | 12 | 3 |
| Albirex Niigata | 2000 | J2 League | 24 | 0 | 3 | 1 | 2 | 1 | 29 | 2 |
| Career total | | | 56 | 3 | 3 | 1 | 10 | 1 | 69 | 5 |
