= Nobuhiro Shiba =

Japanese footballer

Nobuhiro Shiba 柴 暢彦
Personal information
- Full name: Nobuhiro Shiba
- Date of birth: April 18, 1974 (age 52)
- Place of birth: Osaka, Japan
- Height: 1.79 m (5 ft 10 1/2 in)
- Position: Defender

Youth career
- 1990–1992: Hosho High School
- 1993–1996: Fukuoka University

Senior career*
Years	Team	Apps	(Gls)
1997–1998	Oita Trinity	13	(2)
1999–2002	Albirex Niigata	65	(2)
2003	Thespa Kusatsu		
Total		78	(4)
- * Club domestic league appearances and goals

Nobuhiro Shiba (柴 暢彦, Shiba Nobuhiro; born April 18, 1974) is a former Japanese football player.

== Playing career ==
Shiba was born in Osaka Prefecture on April 18, 1974. After graduating from Fukuoka University, he joined Japan Football League club Oita Trinity in 1997. He played as center back in 2 seasons. In 1999, he moved to newly was promoted to J2 League club, Albirex Niigata. He became a regular player as center back. However his opportunity to play decreased from 2001. In 2003, he moved to Japanese Regional Leagues club Thespa Kusatsu. He retired at the end of the 2003 season.

== Career statistics ==
Appearances and goals by club, season and competition
Club	Season	League			Emperor's Cup		J.League Cup		Total	
Club	Season	Division	Apps	Goals	Apps	Goals	Apps	Goals	Apps	Goals
Oita Trinity	1997	Football League	2	0	2	0	—		4	0
Oita Trinity	1998	Football League	11	2	0	0	—		11	2
Albirex Niigata	1999	J2 League	33	2	1	0	1	0	35	2
Albirex Niigata	2000	J2 League	25	0	2	0	0	0	27	0
Albirex Niigata	2001	J2 League	7	0	0	0	0	0	7	0
Albirex Niigata	2002	J2 League	0	0	0	0	—		0	0
Career total			78	4	5	0	1	0	84	4
