= Masayuki Onishi =

Japanese footballer

Masayuki Onishi 大西 昌之
Personal information
- Full name: Masayuki Onishi
- Date of birth: July 5, 1977 (age 49)
- Place of birth: Hokkaido, Japan
- Height: 1.74 m (5 ft 8 1/2 in)
- Position: Forward

Youth career
- 1993–1995: Muroran Otani High School
- 1996–1999: Aichi Gakuin University

Senior career*
Years	Team	Apps	(Gls)
2000	Yokohama F. Marinos	0	(0)
2001	Albirex Niigata	13	(0)
Total		13	(0)
Medal record
Yokohama F. Marinos
Runner-up	J1 League	2000
- * Club domestic league appearances and goals

Masayuki Onishi (大西 昌之, Ōnishi Masayuki; born July 5, 1977) is a former Japanese football player.

== Playing career ==
Onishi was born in Hokkaido on July 5, 1977. After graduating from Aichi Gakuin University, he joined J1 League club Yokohama F. Marinos in 2000. However, he could not play at all in the match. In 2001, he moved to J2 League club Albirex Niigata. Although he played many matches as a substitute forward until May, he could hardly play in the match from June. He retired at the end of the 2001 season.

== Career statistics ==
Appearances and goals by club, season and competition
Club	Season	League			Emperor's Cup		J.League Cup		Total	
Club	Season	Division	Apps	Goals	Apps	Goals	Apps	Goals	Apps	Goals
Yokohama F. Marinos	2000	J1 League	0	0	0	0	0	0	0	0
Albirex Niigata	2001	J2 League	13	0			1	0	13	0
Career total			13	0	0	0	1	0	14	0
