= Rikarudo Higa =

Brazilian-born Japanese footballer

Rikarudo Higa 比嘉 リカルド
Personal information
- Full name: Rikarudo Higa
- Date of birth: May 4, 1973 (age 53)
- Place of birth: Campinas, Brazil
- Height: 1.75 m (5 ft 9 in)
- Position: Midfielder

Senior career*
Years	Team	Apps	(Gls)
1992	Rio Branco		
1994	Santa Helena		
1995	Roma Apucarana		
1998	Yaita SC		
1999	Albirex Niigata	34	(6)
2000	Okinawa Kariyushi FC		
2003–2006	FC Ryukyu		

International career
2004–2008	Japan Futsal		
2009	Japan Beach Soccer		
- * Club domestic league appearances and goals

Rikarudo Higa (比嘉 リカルド, Higa Rikarudo; born May 4, 1973) is a Brazilian-born Japanese football player. He obtained Japanese citizenship in August 2003 and promptly changed his given name from Ricardo to the more "Japanized" pronunciation Rikarudo.

== Football career ==
Higa was born in Campinas, Brazil on May 4, 1973. He played for some Brazilian club until the middle of 1990s. In 1997, he moved to Japan and joined Prefectural Leagues club Yaita SC in 1998. In 1999, he moved to newly was promoted to J2 League club, Albirex Niigata. In 2000, he moved to Prefectural Leagues club Okinawa Kariyushi FC and played in 1 season. In 2003, he joined Prefectural Leagues club FC Ryukyu. The club was promoted to Regional Leagues from 2005 and Japan Football League from 2006. He retired end of 2006 season.

== Futsal career ==
Higa obtained Japanese citizenship in August 2003. In 2003, he was selected Japan national futsal team. He played at 2004 and 2008 Futsal World Cup.

== Beach soccer career ==
In 2009, Higa was selected Japan national beach soccer team for 2009 Beach Soccer World Cup.

== Club statistics ==
Club performance			League		Cup		League Cup		Total	
Season	Club	League	Apps	Goals	Apps	Goals	Apps	Goals	Apps	Goals
Japan			League		Emperor's Cup		J.League Cup		Total	
1999	Albirex Niigata	J2 League	34	6			2	0	36	6
Total			34	6	0	0	2	0	36	6
