= 1998 Yokohama Marinos season =

Yokohama Marinos
1998 season
- Manager: Xabier Azkargorta
- Stadium: International Stadium Yokohama
- J.League: 4th
- Emperor's Cup: 3rd Round
- J.League Cup: GL-B 4th
- Top goalscorer: Shoji Jo (25)
Home colours	Away colours

1998 Yokohama Marinos season

== Competitions ==
Competitions	Position
J.League	4th / 18 clubs
Emperor's Cup	3rd Round
J.League Cup	GL-B 4th / 5 clubs

== Domestic results ==
=== J.League ===
21 March 1998 1-1	Yokohama Marinos	1-2 (GG) (a.e.t.)	Yokohama Flügels	International Stadium Yokohama
JST (UTC+09)

25 March 1998 1-2	Cerezo Osaka	4-3	Yokohama Marinos	Osaka Nagai Stadium
JST (UTC+09)

28 March 1998 1-3	Yokohama Marinos	4-0	Sanfrecce Hiroshima	Yokohama Mitsuzawa Stadium
JST (UTC+09)

4 April 1998 1-4	Avispa Fukuoka	2-5	Yokohama Marinos	Hakatanomori Football Stadium
JST (UTC+09)

11 April 1998 1-5	Yokohama Marinos	4-0	Consadole Sapporo	Yokohama Mitsuzawa Stadium
JST (UTC+09)

15 April 1998 1-6	Shimizu S-Pulse	1-0	Yokohama Marinos	Nihondaira Sports Stadium
JST (UTC+09)

18 April 1998 1-7	Yokohama Marinos	1-0	Kashima Antlers	International Stadium Yokohama
JST (UTC+09)

25 April 1998 1-8	Kashiwa Reysol	0-4	Yokohama Marinos	Hitachi Kashiwa Soccer Stadium
JST (UTC+09)

29 April 1998 1-9	Yokohama Marinos	2-1	Gamba Osaka	International Stadium Yokohama
JST (UTC+09)

2 May 1998 1-10	Yokohama Marinos	2-1	Kyoto Purple Sanga	International Stadium Yokohama
JST (UTC+09)

5 May 1998 1-11	Urawa Red Diamonds	0-1	Yokohama Marinos	Urawa Komaba Stadium
JST (UTC+09)

9 May 1998 1-12	Yokohama Marinos	1-3	Nagoya Grampus Eight	International Stadium Yokohama
JST (UTC+09)

25 July 1998 1-13	Bellmare Hiratsuka	1-4	Yokohama Marinos	Hiratsuka Athletics Stadium
JST (UTC+09)

29 July 1998 1-14	Yokohama Marinos	0-1	Júbilo Iwata	Yamagata Park Stadium
JST (UTC+09)

1 August 1998 1-15	Verdy Kawasaki	2-4	Yokohama Marinos	Todoroki Athletics Stadium
JST (UTC+09)

5 August 1998 1-16	Yokohama Marinos	2-1 (GG) (a.e.t.)	Vissel Kobe	International Stadium Yokohama
JST (UTC+09)

8 August 1998 1-17	JEF United Ichihara	2-1	Yokohama Marinos	Ichihara Seaside Stadium
JST (UTC+09)

22 August 1998 2-1	Júbilo Iwata	2-3 (GG) (a.e.t.)	Yokohama Marinos	Júbilo Iwata Stadium
JST (UTC+09)

29 August 1998 2-2	Yokohama Marinos	2-0	Verdy Kawasaki	International Stadium Yokohama
JST (UTC+09)

5 September 1998 2-3	Vissel Kobe	2-3	Yokohama Marinos	Kobe Universiade Memorial Stadium
JST (UTC+09)

12 September 1998 2-4	Yokohama Marinos	3-2	JEF United Ichihara	Yokohama Mitsuzawa Stadium
JST (UTC+09)

15 September 1998 2-5	Yokohama Flügels	0-2	Yokohama Marinos	International Stadium Yokohama
JST (UTC+09)

19 September 1998 2-6	Yokohama Marinos	2-3	Cerezo Osaka	Yokohama Mitsuzawa Stadium
JST (UTC+09)

23 September 1998 2-7	Sanfrecce Hiroshima	1-2	Yokohama Marinos	Hiroshima Big Arch
JST (UTC+09)

26 September 1998 2-8	Yokohama Marinos	3-0	Avispa Fukuoka	Yokohama Mitsuzawa Stadium
JST (UTC+09)

3 October 1998 2-9	Consadole Sapporo	0-2	Yokohama Marinos	Sapporo Atsubetsu Park Stadium
JST (UTC+09)

14 October 1998 2-10	Yokohama Marinos	3-4 (GG) (a.e.t.)	Shimizu S-Pulse	Yokohama Mitsuzawa Stadium
JST (UTC+09)

17 October 1998 2-11	Kashima Antlers	2-1 (GG) (a.e.t.)	Yokohama Marinos	Kashima Soccer Stadium
JST (UTC+09)

21 October 1998 2-12	Yokohama Marinos	0-1	Kashiwa Reysol	Yokohama Mitsuzawa Stadium
JST (UTC+09)

24 October 1998 2-13	Gamba Osaka	1-4	Yokohama Marinos	Osaka Expo '70 Stadium
JST (UTC+09)

31 October 1998 2-14	Kyoto Purple Sanga	2-1	Yokohama Marinos	Nishikyogoku Athletic Stadium
JST (UTC+09)

3 November 1998 2-15	Yokohama Marinos	3-2	Urawa Red Diamonds	Tokyo National Stadium
JST (UTC+09)

7 November 1998 2-16	Nagoya Grampus Eight	3-2 (GG) (a.e.t.)	Yokohama Marinos	Mizuho Athletic Stadium
JST (UTC+09)

14 November 1998 2-17	Yokohama Marinos	4-2	Bellmare Hiratsuka	International Stadium Yokohama
JST (UTC+09)

=== Emperor's Cup ===
1st Round	bye

2nd Round	bye

13 December 1998 3rd Round	Yokohama Marinos	0-1	Brummell Sendai	Yokohama Mitsuzawa Stadium
JST (UTC+09)

=== J.League Cup ===
GL-B-1	bye

23 May 1998 GL-B-2	Yokohama Marinos	2-0	Cerezo Osaka	Yokohama Mitsuzawa Stadium
JST (UTC+09)

30 May 1998 GL-B-3	Avispa Fukuoka	4-2	Yokohama Marinos	Hakatanomori Football Stadium
JST (UTC+09)

3 June 1998 GL-B-4	Yokohama Marinos	1-2	Kashima Antlers	Yokohama Mitsuzawa Stadium
JST (UTC+09)

6 June 1998 GL-B-5	Kashiwa Reysol	5-2	Yokohama Marinos	Hitachi Kashiwa Soccer Stadium
JST (UTC+09)

== Player statistics ==
No.	Pos.	Nat.	Player	D.o.B. (Age)	Height / Weight	J.League		Emperor's Cup		J.League Cup		Total	
No.	Pos.	Nat.	Player	D.o.B. (Age)	Height / Weight	Apps	Goals	Apps	Goals	Apps	Goals	Apps	Goals
1	GK	(Japan)	Yoshikatsu Kawaguchi	August 15, 1975 (aged 22)	cm / kg	34	0						
2	DF	(Japan)	Katsuo Kanda	June 21, 1966 (aged 31)	cm / kg	19	0						
3	DF	(Japan)	Takehito Suzuki	June 11, 1971 (aged 26)	cm / kg	13	0						
4	DF	(Japan)	Masami Ihara	September 18, 1967 (aged 30)	cm / kg	27	0						
5	DF	(Japan)	Norio Omura	September 6, 1969 (aged 28)	cm / kg	32	3						
6	MF	(Japan)	Yoshiharu Ueno	April 21, 1973 (aged 24)	cm / kg	32	3						
7	FW	(Spain)	Julio Salinas	September 11, 1962 (aged 35)	cm / kg	21	13						
8	MF	(Japan)	Satoru Noda	March 19, 1969 (aged 29)	cm / kg	27	0						
9	FW	(Japan)	Shoji Jo	June 17, 1975 (aged 22)	cm / kg	31	25						
10	MF	(Bolivia)	Julio César Baldivieso	December 2, 1971 (aged 26)	cm / kg	32	10						
11	MF	(Japan)	Fumitake Miura	August 12, 1970 (aged 27)	cm / kg	18	5						
12	MF	(Japan)	Masahiro Fukazawa	July 12, 1977 (aged 20)	cm / kg	7	1						
13	MF	(Japan)	Kunio Nagayama	September 16, 1970 (aged 27)	cm / kg	0	0						
14	DF	(Japan)	Naoki Matsuda	March 14, 1977 (aged 21)	cm / kg	12	0						
15	DF	(Japan)	Yoshiaki Maruyama	October 12, 1974 (aged 23)	cm / kg	4	0						
16	GK	(Japan)	Tatsuya Enomoto	March 16, 1979 (aged 19)	cm / kg	0	0						
17	DF	(Japan)	Ryuji Michiki	August 25, 1973 (aged 24)	cm / kg	18	0						
18	MF	(Japan)	Akihiro Endō	September 18, 1975 (aged 22)	cm / kg	16	1						
19	MF	(Japan)	Yoshito Terakawa	September 6, 1974 (aged 23)	cm / kg	11	0						
20	DF	(Japan)	Kazunari Okayama	April 24, 1978 (aged 19)	cm / kg	5	0						
21	GK	(Japan)	Shinya Yoshihara	April 19, 1978 (aged 19)	cm / kg	0	0						
22	MF	(Japan)	Seiji Koga	August 7, 1979 (aged 18)	cm / kg	3	0						
23	MF	(Japan)	Tomokazu Hirama	June 30, 1977 (aged 20)	cm / kg	13	0						
24	DF	(Japan)	Jun Ideguchi	May 14, 1979 (aged 18)	cm / kg	0	0						
25	MF	(Japan)	Shunsuke Nakamura	June 24, 1978 (aged 19)	cm / kg	33	9						
26	FW	(Japan)	Ryosuke Kijima	May 29, 1979 (aged 18)	cm / kg	2	0						
27	DF	(Serbia and Montenegro)	Dušan Petković	June 13, 1974 (aged 23)	cm / kg	1	0						
28	MF	(Spain)	Ion Andoni Goikoetxea	October 21, 1965 (aged 32)	cm / kg	23	0						
29	FW	(Japan)	Sotaro Yasunaga	April 20, 1976 (aged 21)	cm / kg	19	6						
31	GK	(Japan)	Hideaki Ozawa	March 17, 1974 (aged 24)	cm / kg	0	0						
