= Nasa (footballer, born 1979) =

Brazilian footballer (born 1979)

Personal information
- Full name: Marcos Antonio García Nascimento
- Date of birth: 21 October 1979 (age 47)
- Place of birth: Franca, Brazil
- Height: 1.76 m (5 ft 9 in)
- Position: Attacking midfielder

Senior career*
Years	Team	Apps	(Gls)
1998–1999	Vasco da Gama		
1999	Mirassol		
1999	Kyoto Purple Sanga		
2000	Albirex Niigata	31	(10)
2001–2002	Querétaro		
2003	Celaya	38	(7)
2004	Huracanes de Colima	34	(7)
2005	Rampla Juniors	33	(12)
2006–2007	Querétaro	39	(5)
2008	Peñarol	8	(1)
2009	Defensor Sporting	15	(1)
2009	Atenas	10	(3)
2010	Deportes Concepción	29	(9)
2012	Luverdense		
- * Club domestic league appearances and goals

Marcos Antonio García Nascimento (born 21 October 1979), better known as Nasa, is a Brazilian former footballer. He spent most of his career at foreign countries including Japan, Mexico, Uruguay and Chile.

== Club statistics ==
Club performance			League		Cup		League Cup		Total	
Season	Club	League	Apps	Goals	Apps	Goals	Apps	Goals	Apps	Goals
Japan			League		Emperor's Cup		J.League Cup		Total	
1999	Kyoto Purple Sanga	J1 League	0	0	1	0	0	0	1	0
2000	Albirex Niigata	J2 League	31	10	3	4	2	0	36	14
Total			31	10	4	4	2	0	37	14
