= Tadahiro Akiba =

Japanese footballer & manager (born 1975)

Tadahiro Akiba 秋葉 忠宏
Personal information
- Full name: Tadahiro Akiba
- Date of birth: October 13, 1975 (age 51)
- Place of birth: Chiba, Chiba, Japan
- Height: 1.73 m (5 ft 8 in)
- Position: Midfielder

Team information
- Current team: Júbilo Iwata (manager)

Youth career
- 1991–1993: Ichiritsu Funabashi High School

Senior career*
Years	Team	Apps	(Gls)
1994–1996	JEF United Ichihara	54	(2)
1997	Avispa Fukuoka	0	(0)
1998	Cerezo Osaka	5	(0)
1999–2004	Albirex Niigata	204	(2)
2005–2006	Tokushima Vortis	62	(2)
2006–2008	Thespa Kusatsu	79	(0)
2009–2010	SC Sagamihara		
Total		404	(6)

International career
1995	Japan U-20	4	(0)
1996	Japan U-23	1	(0)

Managerial career
- 2009–2010: SC Sagamihara
- 2013–2014: Thespakusatsu Gunma
- 2020–2022: Mito HollyHock
- 2023–2025: Shimizu S-Pulse
- 2026–: Júbilo Iwata
- * Club domestic league appearances and goals

Tadahiro Akiba (秋葉 忠宏, Akiba Tadahiro; born October 13, 1975) is a Japanese professional football coach and former player who is the manager of J2 League club Júbilo Iwata.

== Club career ==
Akiba was born in Chiba on October 13, 1975. After graduating from high school, he joined his local club JEF United Ichihara in 1994. He played many matches as defensive midfielder in 1995. However his opportunity to play decreased for injury in 1996. Although he moved to Avispa Fukuoka (1997) and Cerezo Osaka (1998), he could hardly play in the match. He moved to J2 League club Albirex Niigata in 1999. He played as regular player and the club was promoted to J1 League end of 2003 season. However his opportunity to play decreased in 2004 season and he moved to Tokushima Vortis in 2005. He played many matches and he moved to Thespa Kusatsu in September 2006. He played until 2008. He moved to SC Sagamihara in 2009 and played as playing manager until 2010. He retired end of 2010 season.

== National team career ==
In April 1995, Akiba was selected Japan U-20 national team for 1995 World Youth Championship. He played full time in all 4 matches as central defender of three backs defense. In July 1996, he was selected Japan U-23 national team for 1996 Summer Olympics. He played 1 match as substitute as defensive midfielder. Although Japan won 2 matches, Japan lost at First round. At this time, Japan won Brazil in first game. It was known as "Miracle of Miami" (マイアミの奇跡) in Japan.

== Coaching career ==
In 2009, when Akiba was player, he became a playing manager for SC Sagamihara. In 2010, he retired playing career and resigned as manager. In 2011, he signed with Mito HollyHock and became an assistant coach. In 2013, he moved to Thespakusatsu Gunma and became a manager. He resigned end of 2014 season.

On 2 December 2019, Akiba signed return with Mito HollyHock and became a manager, he was previously an assistant coach in 2011. He leave from the club in 2022 after two years as manager at Mito.

In April 2023, following the dismissal of Zé Ricardo, Akiba was appointed as manager of J2 League club Shimizu S-Pulse.

== Career statistics ==
Appearances and goals by club, season and competition
Club	Season	League			Emperor's Cup		J.League Cup		Total	
Club	Season	Division	Apps	Goals	Apps	Goals	Apps	Goals	Apps	Goals
JEF United Ichihara	1994	J1 League	1	0	0	0	0	0	1	0
JEF United Ichihara	1995	J1 League	37	1	1	0	—		38	1
JEF United Ichihara	1996	J1 League	16	1	0	0	9	0	25	1
Avispa Fukuoka	1997	J1 League	0	0	0	0	3	0	3	0
Cerezo Osaka	1998	J1 League	5	0	0	0	1	0	6	0
Albirex Niigata	1999	J2 League	35	0	3	0	2	0	40	0
Albirex Niigata	2000	J2 League	32	1	3	0	2	0	37	1
Albirex Niigata	2001	J2 League	43	0	0	0	2	0	45	0
Albirex Niigata	2002	J2 League	41	1	3	0	—		44	1
Albirex Niigata	2003	J2 League	39	0	4	0	—		43	0
Albirex Niigata	2004	J1 League	14	0	0	0	5	0	19	0
Tokushima Vortis	2005	J2 League	41	0	1	0	—		42	0
Tokushima Vortis	2006	J2 League	21	1	0	0	—		21	1
Thespa Kusatsu	2006	J2 League	11	0	2	0	—		13	0
Thespa Kusatsu	2007	J2 League	41	0	2	0	—		43	0
Thespa Kusatsu	2008	J2 League	27	0	0	0	—		27	0
Career total			404	5	19	0	24	0	447	5

== Managerial statistics ==
As of the end of 2022 season.

Team	From	To	Record				
Team	From	To	G	W	D	L	Win %
SC Sagamihara	2009	2010	22	20	2	0	90.91
Thespakusatsu Gunma	2013	2014	84	23	20	41	27.38
Mito HollyHock	2020	2022	126	46	33	47	36.51
Total			232	89	55	88	38.36

== Honours ==
=== Club ===
Shimizu S-Pulse

- J2 League: 2024

== Personal life ==
His cousin Nobuhide Akiba is also a footballer.
