= Beto (footballer, born 1973) =

Brazilian footballer

Personal information
- Full name: Valberto Amorim dos Santos
- Date of birth: March 16, 1973 (age 53)
- Place of birth: Santos, Brazil
- Height: 1.78 m (5 ft 10 in)
- Position: Defensive midfielder

Team information
- Current team: Paraná

Youth career
- 1991–1992: Portuguesa Santista

Senior career*
Years	Team	Apps	(Gls)
1993	Portuguesa Santista		
1994	NEC Yamagata		
1994–1996	Portuguesa Santista		
1997	Inter Limeira		
1998	GE Anápolis		
1998	Londrina		
1999	União Barbarense		
1999	Napoles	10	(0)
2000	Rio Branco-SP		
2000	Lazio	5	(1)
2000–2001	Belenenses		
2001	Gama	10	(0)
2002	Albirex Niigata	29	(11)
2003	União Barbarense		
2004–2006	Paraná	78	(5)
- * Club domestic league appearances and goals

Valberto Amorim dos Santos (born March 16, 1973, in Santos), or simply Beto, is a Brazilian defensive midfielder for Paraná in the Brazilian Série A.

== Contract ==
- 9 April 2006 to 9 April 2008
