= Masahiro Fukasawa =

Japanese footballer (born 1977)

Masahiro Fukasawa 深澤 仁博
Personal information
- Full name: Masahiro Fukasawa
- Date of birth: July 12, 1977 (age 49)
- Place of birth: Numazu, Shizuoka, Japan
- Height: 1.75 m (5 ft 9 in)
- Position: Midfielder

Youth career
- 1993–1995: Shizuoka Gakuen High School

Senior career*
Years	Team	Apps	(Gls)
1996–2000	Yokohama F. Marinos	13	(3)
2000–2004	Albirex Niigata	141	(7)
2005–2006	Montreal Impact	49	(1)
2007	Bangkok University	29	(4)
2008–2009	Singapore Armed Forces	57	(4)
2010	Bangkok United	30	(0)
2011	Fourway Rangers	1	(0)
2012–2013	Bontang	22	(3)
2013–2016	Nagaworld		
2016–2018	Angkor Tiger	31	(0)
Total		373	(22)
Medal record
Yokohama F. Marinos
Runner-up	J1 League	2000
- * Club domestic league appearances and goals

Masahiro Fukasawa (深澤 仁博, Fukasawa Masahiro; born July 12, 1977) is a former Japanese football player.

== Playing career ==
Fukasawa was educated at and played for Shizuoka Gakuen High School, where he led the varsity soccer team to the national championship in 1995. After graduating from high school, he entered professional football.

Fukasawa (in Japan, his name is listed with Fukazawa on J.League officials) played 20 games in J1 League, Yokohama F. Marinos and 134 games in J2 League Albirex Niigata.

In 1996, he played with River Plate in Argentina for a year on loan. In 1999, he went on loan again to play with CD Tenerife in Spain for 6 months. In 2005, he moved to Canada to play for Montreal Impact in the United Soccer League and was named the club's newcomer of the year in his first season .

In 2007, he joined Bangkok University FC in Thailand and became the first Japanese footballer to play for a non-Japanese club in AFC Champions League. In 2008, he moved to Singapore's S.League side Singapore Armed Forces FC.

Presently he decided to come back to Thailand again and join with his former club Bangkok United FC (formerly name Bangkok University FC)"

Masahiro Fukasawa won the accolade as SAFFC’s Player of the Year at the Warriors Nite 2008, the Club’s annual Appreciation Dinner, held on 19 Nov 08 at the Civil Club in Bukit Batok.

The Award marked a personal milestone for the Japanese who joined the Warriors only this year and capped it with a performance that many consider remarkable when he was on the flanks and in central midfield. The versatile Japanese has been said to be highly influential and effective, particularly in the final rundown to the Championship against title contenders, Home United and Super Reds. In early of 2012 he joined Bontang FC.

In 2013 he joined Nagaworld FC in the Cambodian League, where he served as their captain. He stayed with the club for 3 years until moving to Angkor Tiger FC (formerly called "Cambodian Tiger FC") at the end of the 2016 season, where he was also given the captain's armband, succeeding fellow Japanese midfielder Masakazu Kihara.

He is one of the few Japanese players to play in 4 out of 6 Confederations.

== Playing style ==
Small in size but speedy on and off the ball, originally debuted as a skillful shadow striker in J.League. He was converted into an attacking midfield while at Montreal and had sharp one-on-ones. In Singapore, with his ball skills, he was brought into the middle of the field as a holding midfield, and that is where he plays now in Cambodia.

== Club statistics ==
Club performance			League		Cup		League Cup		Total	
Season	Club	League	Apps	Goals	Apps	Goals	Apps	Goals	Apps	Goals
Japan			League		Emperor's Cup		J.League Cup		Total	
1996	Yokohama Marinos	J1 League	0	0	0	0	0	0	0	0
1997	Yokohama Marinos	J1 League	0	0	0	0	0	0	0	0
1998	Yokohama Marinos	J1 League	7	1	0	0	1	0	8	1
1999	Yokohama F. Marinos	J1 League	6	2	0	0	0	0	6	2
2000	Yokohama F. Marinos	J1 League	0	0	0	0	0	0	0	0
2000	Albirex Niigata	J2 League	13	1	2	0	0	0	15	1
2001	Albirex Niigata	J2 League	41	1	4	0	2	0	47	1
2002	Albirex Niigata	J2 League	39	3	3	1	-		42	4
2003	Albirex Niigata	J2 League	41	1	4	0	-		45	1
2004	Albirex Niigata	J1 League	7	1	0	0	1	0	8	1
United States			League		Open Cup		League Cup		Total	
2005	Montreal Impact	USL First Division	28	1					28	1
2006	Montreal Impact	USL First Division	21	0					21	0
Thailand			League		Queen's Cup		League Cup		Total	
2007	Bangkok United	Premier League	29	4					29	4
Singapore			League		Singapore Cup		League Cup		Total	
2008	Singapore Armed Forces	S.League	27	3					27	3
2009	Singapore Armed Forces	S.League	30	1					30	1
2010	Bangkok United	Premier League								
Country	Japan		154	10	13	1	4	0	171	11
Country	United States		49	1					49	1
Country	Thailand		29	4					29	4
Country	Singapore		57	4					57	4
Total			289	19	13	1	4	0	306	20

== Honours ==
=== Club ===
==== Albirex Niigata ====
- J2 League: 2003

==== Singapore Armed Forces ====
- S.League: 2008, 2009
- Singapore Cup: 2008

=== Individual ===
- Montreal Impact's Newcomer of the Year: 2005
- SAFFC's Player of the Year: 2008
- Bangkok united football club : 2010
