= Lindomar =

Lindomar is a given name. Notable people with the name include:

- Lindomar Castilho (1940–2025), Brazilian musician and murderer
- Lindomar Garçon (born 1969), Brazilian politician and pastor
- Lindomar (footballer), full name Lindomar de Paula Queiroz, Brazilian football midfielder
