= Katsuo Kanda =

Japanese footballer

Katsuo Kanda 神田 勝夫
Personal information
- Full name: Katsuo Kanda
- Date of birth: 21 June 1966 (age 60)
- Place of birth: Niigata, Niigata, Japan
- Height: 1.82 m (5 ft 11 1/2 in)
- Positions: Defender; midfielder

Youth career
- 1982–1984: Niigata Technical High School
- 1985–1988: Tokyo University of Agriculture

Senior career*
| Years | Team | Apps | (Gls) |
| 1989–1993 | NKK | 87 | (17) |
| 1994–1997 | Cerezo Osaka | 130 | (12) |
| 1998–1999 | Yokohama F. Marinos | 30 | (0) |
| 2000–2003 | Albirex Niigata | 144 | (5) |
| Total | | 391 | (34) |

International career
| 1995 | Japan | 1 | (0) |
Medal record
Cerezo Osaka
| Runner-up | Emperor's Cup | 1994 |
- * Club domestic league appearances and goals

Katsuo Kanda (神田 勝夫, Kanda Katsuo; born 21 June 1966) is a former Japanese football player. He played for Japan national team.

As a left side-back and a left midfielder, he played 162 matches in the Japanese highest division. He played for NKK, Cerezo Osaka, Yokohama F. Marinos and Albirex Niigata.

== Club career ==
Kanda was educated at and played for Niigata technical high school. His team played at the All Japan High School Soccer Tournament. He continued his study and football at Tokyo University of Agriculture.

After graduating in 1989, Kanda began his senior career with Japan Soccer League side NKK. He played mainly as a forward. He scored 8 goals in the 1993 season, and was the club's top scorer. In the spring 1994, Kanda moved to Japan Football League club Cerezo Osaka. In his first season, he scored 5 goals in 30 league appearances and helped the club to gain the promotion to J1 League. He stayed with Cerezo for the next four years as a left back position, and made almost 150 appearances for the club.

In 2000 he played for his hometown club Albirex Niigata. After four seasons, he played his last professional match on 19 October 2003. His testimonial was played at Niigata Stadium against the Boca Juniors on 27 July 2003. Albirex won the match 2–1. Immediately after retiring he was appointed the new technical director of the club.

== National team career ==
In 1995, Kanda was called up by Shu Kamo to play for the Japan national team in a friendly match against Ecuador on 28 May 1995, which was his only cap.

== Club statistics ==
| Club performance | | | League | | Cup | | League Cup | | Total | |
| Season | Club | League | Apps | Goals | Apps | Goals | Apps | Goals | Apps | Goals |
|---|---|---|---|---|---|---|---|---|---|---|
| 1989/90 | NKK | JSL Division 1 | 14 | 0 | | | | | 14 | 0 |
| 1990/91 | NKK | JSL Division 1 | 18 | 0 | | | 0 | 0 | 18 | 0 |
| 1991/92 | NKK | JSL Division 2 | 29 | 6 | | | 2 | 1 | 31 | 7 |
| 1992 | NKK | Football League | 16 | 3 | | | - | | 16 | 3 |
| 1993 | NKK | Football League | 10 | 8 | 1 | 0 | - | | 11 | 8 |
| 1994 | Cerezo Osaka | Football League | 30 | 5 | 5 | 0 | 1 | 0 | 36 | 5 |
| 1995 | Cerezo Osaka | J1 League | 49 | 4 | 2 | 1 | - | | 51 | 5 |
| 1996 | Cerezo Osaka | J1 League | 23 | 2 | 2 | 0 | 13 | 2 | 38 | 4 |
| 1997 | Cerezo Osaka | J1 League | 28 | 1 | 2 | 0 | 0 | 0 | 30 | 1 |
| 1998 | Yokohama Marinos | J1 League | 19 | 0 | 1 | 0 | 3 | 0 | 23 | 0 |
| 1999 | Yokohama F. Marinos | J1 League | 11 | 0 | 0 | 0 | 1 | 0 | 12 | 0 |
| 2000 | Albirex Niigata | J2 League | 32 | 3 | 3 | 0 | 2 | 0 | 37 | 3 |
| 2001 | Albirex Niigata | J2 League | 32 | 0 | 4 | 0 | 0 | 0 | 36 | 0 |
| 2002 | Albirex Niigata | J2 League | 33 | 2 | 1 | 0 | - | | 34 | 2 |
| 2003 | Albirex Niigata | J2 League | 17 | 0 | 0 | 0 | - | | 17 | 0 |
| Total | | | 361 | 34 | 21 | 1 | 22 | 3 | 404 | 38 |

== National team statistics ==
Japan national team
| Year | Apps | Goals |
|---|---|---|
| 1995 | 1 | 0 |
| Total | 1 | 0 |
