= Yoshiaki Maruyama =

Japanese footballer

Yoshiaki Maruyama 丸山 良明
Personal information
- Full name: Yoshiaki Maruyama
- Date of birth: October 12, 1974 (age 52)
- Place of birth: Machida, Tokyo, Japan
- Height: 1.78 m (5 ft 10 in)
- Position: Defender

Youth career
- 1990–1992: Teikyo High School
- 1993–1996: Waseda University

Senior career*
Years	Team	Apps	(Gls)
1997–2001	Yokohama F. Marinos	17	(0)
2000	→Montedio Yamagata (loan)	35	(0)
2002–2005	Albirex Niigata	114	(1)
2006–2007	Vegalta Sendai	12	(0)
2008	AC Nagano Parceiro	14	(1)
2009	Chonburi	12	(1)
2010–2011	Thai Port	7	(0)
Total		211	(3)

Managerial career
- 2020: Cerezo Osaka U-23
Medal record
Yokohama F. Marinos
Winner	J.League Cup	2001
- * Club domestic league appearances and goals

Yoshiaki Maruyama (丸山 良明, Maruyama Yoshiaki; born October 12, 1974) is a former Japanese football player.

== Playing career ==
Maruyama was born in Machida on October 12, 1974. After graduating from Waseda University, he joined J1 League club Yokohama Marinos (later Yokohama F. Marinos) in 1997. He played center back in 1997 when Masami Ihara and Norio Omura left the club for Japan national team. However he could hardly play in the match from 1998. In 2000, he moved to J2 League club Montedio Yamagata on loan. He played as regular center back. In 2001, he returned to Yokohama F. Marinos. However he could hardly play in the match. In 2002, he moved to J2 club Albirex Niigata. He played as regular center back and the club won the champions in 2003 and was promoted to J1 from 2004. However his opportunity to play decreased for injury from 2004 and he left the club end of 2005 season. After rehabilitation in 6 months, he joined J2 club Vegalta Sendai in July 2006. However he could hardly play in the match for injury. In 2008, he moved to Regional Leagues club AC Nagano Parceiro and played in all matches in 2008 season. In 2009, he moved to Thailand and played for Chonburi (2009) and Thai Port (2010-11). He retired at the end of the 2011 season.

== Club statistics ==
Club performance			League		Cup		League Cup		Total	
Season	Club	League	Apps	Goals	Apps	Goals	Apps	Goals	Apps	Goals
Japan			League		Emperor's Cup		J.League Cup		Total	
1997	Yokohama Marinos	J1 League	8	0	0	0	6	1	14	1
1998	Yokohama Marinos	J1 League	4	0	0	0	0	0	4	0
1999	Yokohama F. Marinos	J1 League	0	0	0	0	0	0	0	0
2000	Montedio Yamagata	J2 League	35	0	2	0	0	0	37	0
2001	Yokohama F. Marinos	J1 League	5	0	0	0	2	0	7	0
2002	Albirex Niigata	J2 League	40	0	3	0	-		43	0
2003	Albirex Niigata	J2 League	44	1	3	0	-		47	1
2004	Albirex Niigata	J1 League	19	0	1	0	1	0	21	0
2005	Albirex Niigata	J1 League	11	0	0	0	2	0	13	0
2006	Vegalta Sendai	J2 League	9	0	1	0	-		10	0
2007	Vegalta Sendai	J2 League	3	0	0	0	-		3	0
2008	AC Nagano Parceiro	Regional Leagues	14	1	-		-		14	1
Thailand			League		Queen's Cup		League Cup		Total	
2009	Chonburi	Premier League	12	1	0	0	-		12	1
2010	Thai Port	Premier League	7	0	0	0	-		7	0
2011	Thai Port	Premier League								
Country	Japan		192	2	10	0	11	1	213	3
Country	Thailand		19	1	0	0	-		19	1
Total			211	3	10	0	11	1	232	4

== Honours ==
Clubs

- Kor Royal Cup 2009 Winner with Chonburi FC
