= Serjão (footballer, born 1975) =

Brazilian footballer

Sérgio
Personal information
- Full name: Sérgio Ricardo de Jesus Vertello
- Date of birth: September 19, 1975 (age 51)
- Place of birth: São Paulo, Brazil
- Height: 1.84 m (6 ft 0 in)
- Position: Defender

Senior career*
Years	Team	Apps	(Gls)
1990–1998	Juventus		
1999–2002	Albirex Niigata		
2003	Avispa Fukuoka		
2004	Ituano		
2004	→ Vasco da Gama (loan)		
2004–2005	→ Duisburg (loan)	2	(0)
2006	Vila Nova		
- * Club domestic league appearances and goals

Sérgio Ricardo de Jesus Vertello known as Sérgio or Serjão (big Sérgio; born 19 September 1975 in São Paulo) is a former Brazilian footballer.

He signed a six-month contract with Vila Nova in January 2006.

== Club statistics ==
Club performance			League		Cup		League Cup		Total	
Season	Club	League	Apps	Goals	Apps	Goals	Apps	Goals	Apps	Goals
Japan			League		Emperor's Cup		J.League Cup		Total	
1999	Albirex Niigata	J2 League	24	1	2	3	2	0	28	4
2000	Albirex Niigata	J2 League	29	1	3	0	2	0	34	1
2001	Albirex Niigata	J2 League	35	4	3	0	2	0	40	4
2002	Albirex Niigata	J2 League	39	6	0	0	-		39	6
2003	Avispa Fukuoka	J2 League	28	0	0	0	-		28	0
Total			155	12	8	3	6	0	169	15
