= Niigata Athletic Stadium =

Sports venue in Niigata, Japan

Niigata City Athletics Stadium
- Shi-Riku
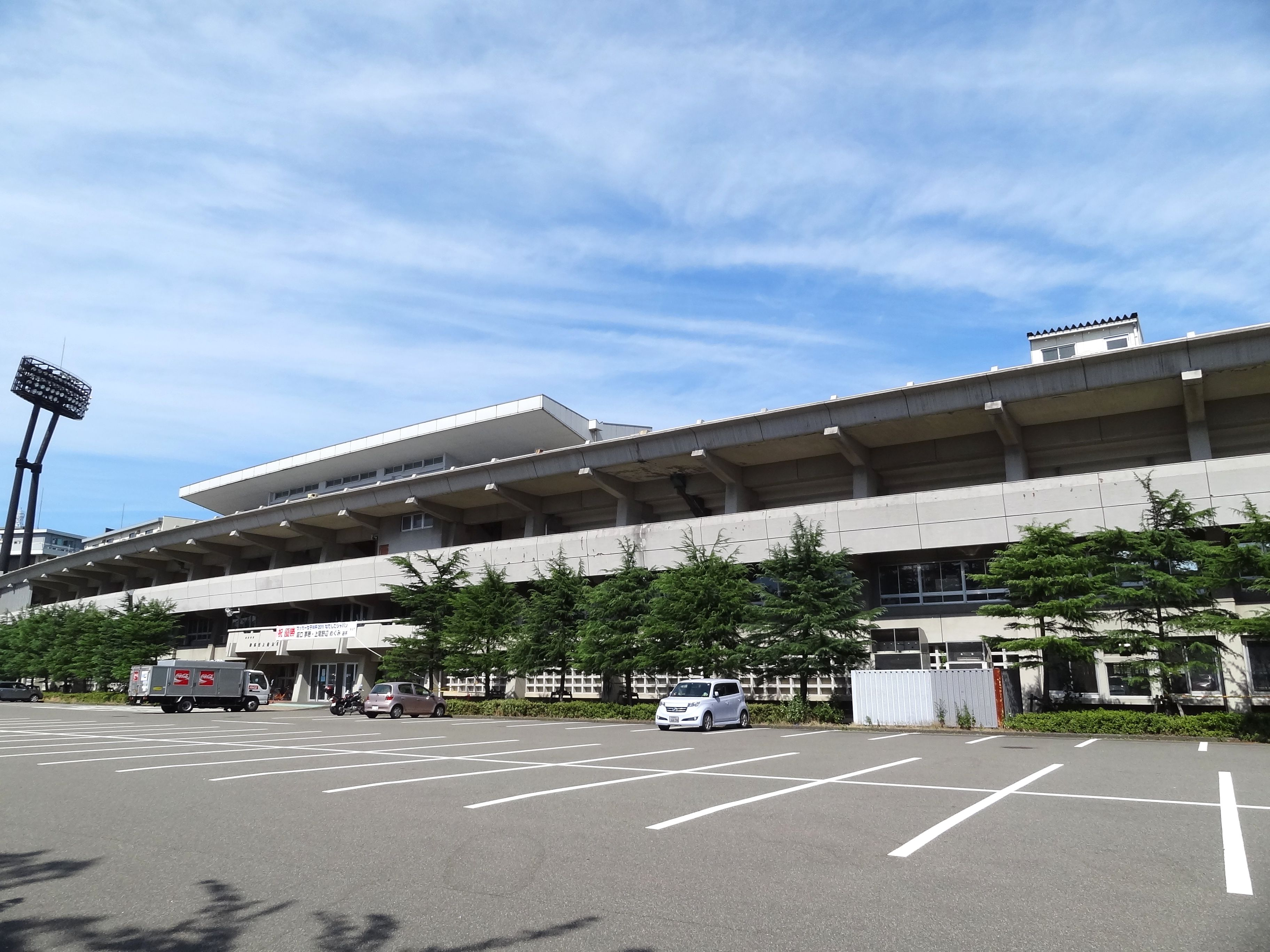

- Location within Niigata Prefecture Location within Japan
- Interactive map of Niigata City Athletics Stadium
- Full name: Niigata Athletic Stadium
- Former names: Hakusan Athletic Stadium (1936–1964)
- Location: Niigata, Niigata, Japan
- Coordinates: 37.913038°N 139.036142°E
- Owner: City of Niigata
- Capacity: 18,671
- Surface: Grass

Construction
- Groundbreaking: 1936
- Opened: 1936
- Renovated: 1964, 1993

Tenants
- 1998–2001 Albirex Niigata; 2002–present Albirex Ladies

Niigata City Athletics Stadium (新潟市陸上競技場, Niigata-shi Rikujō-kyōgijō) is a sports venue in Niigata, Japan, and was the home of the Albirex Niigata football team until they moved to the Big Swan in 2001. It is used mostly for association football matches, but also for rugby union and athletics. The stadium is an athletics stadium which has hosted major Japanese athletic events, including the 1964 National Sports Festival. Albirex Niigata Ladies also use the stadium.

== See also ==
- Hakusan Park, the park in which the stadium is located
