= 2012 Matsumoto Yamaga FC season =

Matsumoto Yamaga
2012 season
- Chairman: Hiroshi Otsuki
- Manager: Yasuharu Sorimachi
- J.League Division 2: 12th
- Emperor's Cup: 2nd round
- Top goalscorer: League: Takayuki Funayama (12 goals); All: Takayuki Funayama (12 goals)
- Highest home attendance: 13,098 vs Montedio Yamagata (11 March 2012)
- Lowest home attendance: 4,471 vs Giravanz Kitakyushu (17 March 2012)
- Average home league attendance: 9,531
Home colours	Away colours

The 2012 Matsumoto Yamaga FC season sees Matsumoto Yamaga compete in J.League Division 2 for the first time after being promoted from the 2011 Japan Football League. Matsumoto Yamaga are also competing in the 2012 Emperor's Cup.

== Players ==
=== First team squad ===
As of March 4, 2012

Note: Flags indicate national team as defined under FIFA eligibility rules; some limited exceptions apply. Players may hold more than one non-FIFA nationality.

No.	Pos.	Nation	Player
1	GK	JPN	Tasuku Ishikawa
2	DF	JPN	Ryuji Ito
4	DF	JPN	Masaki Iida
5	MF	JPN	Kenta Komatsu
6	MF	JPN	Shota Imai
7	MF	JPN	Ryuji Kitamura
8	MF	JPN	Kento Tsurumaki
9	FW	BRA	Eydison
11	FW	JPN	Masato Katayama
13	FW	JPN	Tetsuya Kijima
14	DF	JPN	Mutsumi Tamabayashi
15	DF	JPN	Takuya Abe
16	DF	JPN	Hiroshi Tetsuto
17	MF	JPN	Ken Hisatomi
18	MF	JPN	Akihito Kusunose
19	FW	JPN	Shogo Shiozawa

No.	Pos.	Nation	Player
20	MF	JPN	Yusuke Sudo
21	GK	JPN	Yosuke Nozawa
22	DF	JPN	Masaki Yoshida
23	DF	JPN	Atsuto Tatara
24	DF	KOR	Lee Jong-min
25	GK	JPN	Yuto Shirai
26	MF	JPN	Kosei Arita
27	MF	JPN	Masahiro Ohashi
28	DF	JPN	Kazuya Iio
29	DF	JPN	Yuta Murase
30	MF	JPN	Takumi Watanabe
32	FW	JPN	Takayuki Funayama
33	FW	JPN	Ryosuke Kijima
35	FW	JPN	Shingo Kukita
36	MF	JPN	Tsukasa Masuyama
38	MF	JPN	Kohei Kiyama

=== Mid-season Transfer ===
(substituted on) In

No.	Pos.	Nation	Player
9	FW	BRA	Allisson Ricardo Faramílio (on loan from Audax São Paulo Esporte Clube)
10	MF	BRA	Thiago Araújo da Silva (from Central Sport Club)
22	MF	JPN	Akito Tachibana (on loan from Shimizu S-Pulse)
24	DF	JPN	Yuji Fujikawa (on loan from Oita Trinita)
30	DF	JPN	Yugo Ichiyanagi (on loan from Fagiano Okayama)
31	GK	JPN	Yuya Miura (on loan from Kashiwa Reysol)
37	MF	KOR	Yoon Sun-Yeul (from F.C. Machida Zelvia)
39	FW	KOR	Choi Su-Bin (from Osotspa Saraburi F.C.)
41	FW	JPN	Shuho Miyashita (from Souzou Gakuen High School as a designated player by JFA and J. League)
45	GK	JPN	Shuhei Yamada (from Aoyama Gakuin University as a designated player by JFA and J. League)

(substituted off) Out

No.	Pos.	Nation	Player
6	MF	JPN	Shota Imai (on loan to Blaublitz Akita)
9	FW	BRA	Eydison
17	MF	JPN	Ken Hisatomi (on loan to Fujieda MYFC)
22	DF	JPN	Masaki Yoshida (on loan to F.C. Ryūkyū)
24	DF	KOR	Lee Jong-min
33	FW	JPN	Ryosuke Kijima (to Tokyo Verdy)

== Competitions ==
=== J. League ===
==== League table ====
Pos	Team	Pld	W	D	L	GF	GA	GD	Pts
10	Montedio Yamagata	42	16	13	13	51	49	+2	61
11	Tochigi SC	42	17	9	16	50	49	+1	60
12	Matsumoto Yamaga	42	15	14	13	46	43	+3	59
13	Mito HollyHock	42	15	11	16	47	49	−2	56
14	Roasso Kumamoto	42	15	10	17	40	48	−8	55

Updated to match(es) played on 11 November 2012. Source: J.League Division 2
Rules for classification: 1st points; 2nd goal differential; 3rd goals scored; 4th head-to-head results; 5th disciplinary points; 6th draw. If two clubs are tied for first place, both clubs will be declared champions.

==== Matches ====
4 March 2012 1	Tokyo Verdy	2 - 0	Matsumoto Yamaga	Ajinomoto Stadium
Sunday 13:05	51' Kobayashi; 58' Josimar	Report		Attendance: 12,432; Referee: Fukushima

11 March 2012 2	Matsumoto Yamaga	1 - 2	Montedio Yamagata	Matsumotodaira Park Stadium Alwin
Sunday 13:03	Tsurumaki 37'	Report	28', 72' Akiba	Attendance: 13,098; Referee: Yoshida

17 March 2012 3	Matsumoto Yamaga	1 - 0	Giravanz Kitakyushu	Matsumotodaira Park Stadium Alwin
Saturday 14:04	Iida 19'	Report		Attendance: 4,471; Referee: Oka

20 March 2012 4	Ehime F.C.	3 - 0	Matsumoto Yamaga	Ningineer Stadium
Tuesday 16:06	Ishii 14'; Akai 80', 86'	Report		Attendance: 3,598; Referee: Hayakawa

24 March 2012 5	Mito HollyHock	0 - 0	Matsumoto Yamaga	K's denki Stadium Mito
Saturday 13:04		Report		Attendance: 2,952; Referee: Hidaka

1 April 2012 6	Matsumoto Yamaga	0 - 3	Kataller Toyama	Matsumotodaira Park Stadium Alwin
Sunday 13:03		Report	20' Seo; 43', 62' Nishikawa	Attendance: 8,529; Referee: Yamauchi

8 April 2012 7	Fagiano Okayama	1 - 0	Matsumoto Yamaga	Kanko Stadium
14:00 (UTC+09)	Kawamata 26' (yellow card) 26'	Report	Tetsuto (yellow card) 42'	Attendance: 7,877; Referee: (Japan) Nobutsugu Murakami

15 April 2012 8	Roasso Kumamoto	0 - 3	Matsumoto Yamaga	Suizenji Stadium
14:00 (UTC+09)	Yoshii (yellow card) 38'	Report	Iida (yellow card) 12'; Shiozawa 39'; Tetsuto 72'; Atsuto Tatara 76'	Attendance: 5,472; Referee: (Japan) Yuki Noda

22 April 2012 9	Matsumoto Yamaga	1 - 0	JEF United Ichihara Chiba	Matsumotodaira Park Stadium Alwin
17:00 (UTC+09)	Kenta Komatsu (yellow card) 62'; Atsuto Tatara 84'	Report		Attendance: 6,740; Referee: (Japan) Toshimitsu Yoshida

27 April 2012 10	Machida Zelvia	0 - 1	Matsumoto Yamaga	Machida Athletic Stadium
20:00 (UTC+09)	Ota (yellow card) 15'; Sonoda (yellow card) 55'; Kato (yellow card) 65'; Tashiro (yellow card) 80'; Fujita (yellow card) 81'	Report	Shiozawa (yellow card) 23'; Kiyama (yellow card) 66'; Funayama 76' (pen.) (yellow card) 77'; Kenta Komatsu (yellow card) 88'; Kusunose (yellow card) 90+2'	Attendance: 3,859; Referee: (Japan) Taku Nagaya

30 April 2012 11	Matsumoto Yamaga	0 - 0	Kyoto Sanga	Matsumotodaira Park Stadium Alwin
16:00 (UTC+09)		Report	Nakayama (yellow card) 81'; Akimoto (yellow card) 90+4'	Attendance: 12,154; Referee: (Japan) Akihiko Ikeuchi

3 May 2012 12	Tokushima Vortis	1 - 0	Matsumoto Yamaga	Pocarisweat Stadium
17:00 (UTC+09)	Elizeu 71'	Report		Attendance: 5,272; Referee: (Japan) Yuichi Nishimura

6 May 2012 13	Matsumoto Yamaga	1 - 1	Shonan Bellmare	Matsumotodaira Park Stadium Alwin
17:00 (UTC+09)	Iida (yellow card) 17'; Funayama (yellow card) 59' (goal) 86'	Report	Han Kook-Young (yellow card) 29'; Baba 88'	Attendance: 8,323; Referee: (Japan) Ryoichi Imamura

13 May 2012 14	Gifu	0 - 1	Matsumoto Yamaga	Gifu Nagaragawa Stadium
20:00 (UTC+09)	Kohei Nakajima (yellow card) 76'	Report	Tsurumaki 40'; Watanabe (yellow card) 69'	Attendance: 5,088; Referee: (Japan) Yosuke Kubota

20 May 2012 15	Matsumoto Yamaga	0 - 2	Yokohama	Matsumotodaira Park Stadium Alwin
14:00 (UTC+09)	Iida (yellow card) 60'; Tetsuto (yellow card) 77'	Report	Nozaki 69'; Sato 78'	Attendance: 13,062; Referee: (Japan) Hiroshi Yamauchi

27 May 2012 16	Thespa Kusatsu	0 - 0	Matsumoto Yamaga	Shoda Shoyu Stadium Gunma
14:00 (UTC+09)	Kobayashi (yellow card) 54'	Report	Kenta Komatsu (yellow card) 79'	Attendance: 5,074; Referee: (Japan) Shoichiro Mikami

2 June 2012 17	Matsumoto Yamaga	1 - 1	Ventforet Kofu	Matsumotodaira Park Stadium Alwin
15:00 (UTC+09)	Tetsuto 22'; Mutsumi Tamabayashi (yellow card) 80'	Report	Sasaki (yellow card) 17'; Davi 37'; Douglas Santos (yellow card) 74'; Yamamoto (yellow card) 90+3'	Attendance: 12,341; Referee: (Japan) Tomoya Maeda

9 June 2012 18	Oita Trinita	2 - 0	Matsumoto Yamaga	Ōita Bank Dome
15:00 (UTC+09)	Morishima 8', 89'; Murai (yellow card) 41'; Miyazawa (yellow card) 51'	Report	Iida (yellow card) 20'; Yoon Sung-Yeul (yellow card) 32'	Attendance: 8,019; Referee: (Japan) Kazuyoshi Enomoto

13 June 2012 19	Matsumoto Yamaga	2 - 2	Avispa Fukuoka	Matsumotodaira Park Stadium Alwin
20:00 (UTC+09)	Shiozawa 8'; Tetsuya Kijima 70' (yellow card) 71'	Report	Atsuto Tatara 15' (o.g.); Jogo 16'; Okada (yellow card) 32'; Kamiyama (yellow card) 65'; Kobara (yellow card) 69'; Suzuki (yellow card) 83'	Attendance: 7,111; Referee: (Japan) Hiromichi Oka

17 June 2012 20	Gainare Tottori	0 - 1	Matsumoto Yamaga	Tottori Bank Bird Stadium
19:00 (UTC+09)	Sanenobu (yellow card) 50'; Miura (yellow card) 77'; Kato (yellow card) 87'	Report	Funayama 33'; Eydison (yellow card) 80'; Iida (yellow card) 82'	Attendance: 2,712; Referee: (Japan) Tetsuro Yoshida

24 June 2012 21	Matsumoto Yamaga	0 - 2	Tochigi S.C.	Matsumotodaira Park Stadium Alwin
19:00 (UTC+09)	Kiyama (yellow card) 66'	Report	Kikuoka 22' (yellow card) 75'; Sabia 50'; Kan (yellow card) 57'; Usami (yellow card) 72'; Paulinho (yellow card) 78'	Attendance: 9,048; Referee: (Japan) Koei Koya

1 July 2012 22	Shonan Bellmare	1 - 1	Matsumoto Yamaga	Shonan BMW Stadium Hiratsuka
19:30 (UTC+09)	Shimomura 36'; Kaoru Takayama (yellow card) 81'	Report	Iio (yellow card) 31'; Ōhashi (yellow card) 79'; Funayama 90+3'	Attendance: 6,693; Referee: (Japan) Shoichiro Mikami

8 July 2012 23	Matsumoto Yamaga	3 - 2	Tokyo Verdy	Matsumotodaira Park Stadium Alwin
19:00 (UTC+09)	Tsurumaki 38' (yellow card) 42'; Mutsumi Tamabayashi 81'; Shiozawa 85'	Report	Mori 68'; Chugo 90'	Attendance: 10,092; Referee: (Japan) Takuto Okabe

15 July 2012 24	Ventforet Kofu	2 - 1	Matsumoto Yamaga	Yamanashi Chuo Bank Stadium
19:00 (UTC+09)	Kashiwa (yellow card) 23' (yellow-red card) 83'; Davi 25'; Hosaka 60'	Report	Kiyama (yellow card) 24'; Tetsuto 51'; Kusunose (yellow card) 73'	Attendance: 14,150

22 July 2012 25	Matsumoto Yamaga	3 - 0	Fagiano Okayama	Matsumotodaira Park Stadium Alwin
19:00 (UTC+09)	Ōhashi 45'; Funayama 66'; Kusunose (yellow card) 82'; Shiozawa 84'	Report	Takeda (yellow card) 41'	Attendance: 8,954; Referee: (Japan) Eiji Kawai

29 July 2012 26	Montedio Yamagata	1 - 1	Matsumoto Yamaga	ND Soft Stadium Yamagata
20:00 (UTC+09)	Nakashima 64'; Maeda (yellow card) 75'	Report	Ōhashi (yellow card) 67'; Funayama 75'; Iida (yellow card) 90'	Attendance: 11,132; Referee: (Japan) Hajime Matsuo

5 August 2012 27	Matsumoto Yamaga	1 - 1	Ehime	Matsumotodaira Park Stadium Alwin
19:00 (UTC+09)	Tamabayashi (yellow card) 24'; Funayama (yellow card) 75'; Hisatomi 80'; Iio (yellow card) 90+6'	Report	Uchida 34'; Fukuda (yellow card) 45+1'	Attendance: 10,642; Referee: (Japan) Kenji Ogiya

12 August 2012 28	Kataller Toyama	-	Matsumoto Yamaga	Toyama Athletic Stadium
19:00 (UTC+09)

19 August 2012 29	Matsumoto Yamaga	-	Roasso Kumamoto	Matsumotodaira Park Stadium Alwin
19:00 (UTC+09)

22 August 2012 30	Kyoto Sanga	-	Matsumoto Yamaga	Nishikyogoku Athletic Stadium
20:00 (UTC+09)

26 August 2012 31	Avispa Fukuoka	-	Matsumoto Yamaga	Level-5 Stadium
20:00 (UTC+09)

2 September 2012 32	Matsumoto Yamaga	-	Thespa Kusatsu	Matsumotodaira Park Stadium Alwin
19:00 (UTC+09)

13 September 2012 33	Matsumoto Yamaga	-	Machida Zelvia	Matsumotodaira Park Stadium Alwin

16 September 2012 34	Yokohama	-	Matsumoto Yamaga	Nippatsu Mitsuzawa Stadium

22 September 2012 35	Matsumoto Yamaga	-	Gainare Tottori	Matsumotodaira Park Stadium Alwin

29 September 2012 36	Matsumoto Yamaga	-	Gifu	Matsumotodaira Park Stadium Alwin

6 October 2012 37	Giravanz Kitakyushu	-	Matsumoto Yamaga	Honjō Athletic Stadium

13 October 2012 38	Matsumoto Yamaga	-	Tokushima Vortis	Matsumotodaira Park Stadium Alwin

20 October 2012 39	Matsumoto Yamaga	-	Mito HollyHock	Matsumotodaira Park Stadium Alwin

27 October 2012 40	Tochigi S.C.	-	Matsumoto Yamaga	Tochigi Green Stadium

3 November 2012 41	JEF United Ichihara Chiba	-	Matsumoto Yamaga	Fukuda Denshi Arena

10 November 2012 42	Matsumoto Yamaga	-	Oita Trinita	Matsumotodaira Park Stadium Alwin
