= 2013 Matsumoto Yamaga FC season =

Matsumoto Yamaga
2013 season
- Chairman: Hiroshi Otsuki
- Manager: Yasuharu Sorimachi
- J.League Division 2: 7th
- Emperor's Cup: 3rd round
- Top goalscorer: League: Takayuki Funayama (11 goals); All: Shogo Shiozawa (12 goals)
- Highest home attendance: 17,148 vs Gamba Osaka (22 September 2013)
- Lowest home attendance: 7,153 vs Mito HollyHock (3 July 2013)
- Average home league attendance: 11,041
| Home colours | Away colours |

The 2013 Matsumoto Yamaga FC season sees Matsumoto Yamaga compete in J. League Division 2. Matsumoto Yamaga are also competing in the 2013 Emperor's Cup.

== Players ==
=== Pre-season Transfers ===
(substituted on) In
| No. | Pos. | Player | From | Notes |
|---|---|---|---|---|
| 21 | GK | (Japan) Tomohiko Murayama | Sagawa Shiga F.C. | |
| 31 | GK | (Japan) Kengo Nagai | Mitsubishi Yowa SC Youth | |
| 6 | DF | (Japan) Shunsuke Iwanuma | Consadole Sapporo | |
| 15 | DF | (Japan) Ryosuke Kawanabe | Giravanz Kitakyushu | |
| 35 | DF | (Japan) Shusaku Tokita | Meikai University | |
| 11 | MF | (Japan) Kohei Kiyama | Fagiano Okayama | |
| 24 | MF | (South Korea) Park Kwang Il | Yonsei University | |
| 27 | MF | (Japan) Ryutaro Iio | Hannan University | |
| 30 | MF | (Japan) Ryota Iwabuchi | Meiji University | |
| 32 | MF | (Japan) Kohei Kurata | Kansai University of International Studies | |
| 34 | MF | (Japan) Makito Yoshida | Nagoya Grampus | on loan |
| 36 | MF | (Japan) Shuho Miyashita | Sozo Gakuen High School | |
| 37 | MF | (Japan) Mitsuo Yamada | Obihiro Kita High School | |
| 38 | MF | (Japan) Tatsuya Wada | Kokoku High School | |
| 7 | FW | (Japan) Yuki Kitai | F.C. Machida Zelvia | |
| 9 | FW | (Brazil) Rodrigo Cabeça | Desportivo Brasil | on loan |
| 20 | FW | (Japan) Shun Nagasawa | Shimizu S-Pulse | on loan |
| 33 | FW | (Japan) Ryota Nakamura | Chukyo University | |

(substituted off) Out
| No. | Pos. | Player | To | Notes |
|---|---|---|---|---|
| 1 | GK | (Japan) Tasuku Ishikawa | | retired |
| 31 | GK | (Japan) Yuya Miura | Kashiwa Reysol | loan return |
| 2 | DF | (Japan) Ryuji Ito | FC Ryukyu | on loan |
| 15 | DF | (Japan) Takuya Abe | Tochigi Uva F.C. | |
| 22 | DF | (Japan) Masaki Yoshida | FC Ryukyu | |
| 24 | DF | (Japan) Yuji Fujikawa | Oita Trinita | loan return |
| 34 | DF | (Japan) Yugo Ichiyanagi | Fagiano Okayama | loan return |
| 6 | MF | (Japan) Shota Imai | MIO Biwako Shiga | |
| 7 | MF | (Japan) Ryuji Kitamura | F.C. Gifu SECOND | |
| 10 | MF | (Brazil) Thiago Silva | | |
| 17 | MF | (Japan) Ken Hisatomi | Fujieda MYFC | |
| 20 | MF | (Japan) Yusuke Sudo | Salgueiro Atlético Clube | |
| 22 | MF | (Japan) Akito Tachibana | Shimizu S-Pulse | loan return |
| 26 | MF | (Japan) Kosei Arita | Fujieda MYFC | on loan |
| 27 | MF | (Japan) Masahiro Ohashi | | retired |
| 29 | MF | (Japan) Yuta Murase | Fujieda MYFC | on loan |
| 30 | MF | (Japan) Takumi Watanabe | Yokohama F.C. | |
| 36 | MF | (Japan) Tsukasa Masuyama | JEF United Ichihara Chiba | loan return |
| 9 | FW | (Brazil) Allisson Ricardo | Audax São Paulo Esporte Clube | loan return |
| 11 | FW | (Japan) Masato Katayama | | retired |
| 13 | FW | (Japan) Tetsuya Kijima | F.C. Machida Zelvia | |
| 35 | FW | (Japan) Shingo Kukita | Fagiano Okayama | loan return |
| 36 | FW | (South Korea) Choi Su-Bin | Mokpo City FC | |

=== Mid-season Transfers ===
(substituted on) In
| No. | Pos. | Player | From | Notes |
|---|---|---|---|---|
| 13 | DF | (Japan) Tomoya Inukai | Shimizu S-Pulse | on loan |
| 41 | DF | (Japan) Yuki Miyazawa | Kokushikan University | |
| 49 | DF | (Japan) Takumi Abe | F.C. Tokyo | |
| 47 | MF | (Japan) Yuzo Iwakami | Shonan Bellmare | on loan |
| 48 | FW | (Brazil) Felipe Guimarães Alves | Avaí Futebol Clube | on loan |

(substituted off) Out
| No. | Pos. | Player | To | Notes |
|---|---|---|---|---|
| 35 | DF | (Japan) Shusaku Tokita | Fukushima United FC | on loan |

== Competitions ==
=== J. League ===
==== League table ====
| Pos | Team | Pld | W | D | L | GF | GA | GD | Pts | Promotion or relegation |
|---|---|---|---|---|---|---|---|---|---|---|
| 5 | JEF United Chiba | 42 | 18 | 12 | 12 | 68 | 49 | +19 | 66 | Qualification for Promotion Playoffs (Note: Only teams that meet J1 criteria can participate in promotion playoffs. If one or more teams fail to meet the criteria, only eligible teams that finished 3rd to 6th participate and no replacement teams are added.) |
| 6 | V-Varen Nagasaki | 42 | 19 | 9 | 14 | 48 | 40 | +8 | 66 | Qualification for Promotion Playoffs |
| 7 | Matsumoto Yamaga | 42 | 19 | 9 | 14 | 54 | 54 | 0 | 66 | |
| 8 | Consadole Sapporo | 42 | 20 | 4 | 18 | 60 | 49 | +11 | 64 | |
| 9 | Tochigi SC | 42 | 17 | 12 | 13 | 61 | 55 | +6 | 63 | |

Updated to match(es) played on 8 December 2013. Source: J.League Division 2
Rules for classification: 1) points; 2) goal difference; 3) number of goals scored.

==== Matches ====
| 3 March 2013 Match 1 | Tochigi | 0 - 1 | Matsumoto Yamaga | Utsunomiya, Tochigi |
| 15:00 | Paulinho (yellow card) 26' | Summary | Yoon Sung-Yeul (yellow card) 25'; Shiozawa 33' | Stadium: Tochigi Green Stadium; Attendance: 8,686; Referee: (Japan) Yosuke Kubota |

| 10 March 2013 Match 2 | Ehime | 1 - 1 | Matsumoto Yamaga | Matsuyama, Ehime |
| 15:00 | Ishii 75' | Summary | Iida 32' | Stadium: Ningineer Stadium; Attendance: 3,325; Referee: (Japan) Kazuyoshi Enomoto |

| 17 March 2013 Match 3 | Matsumoto Yamaga | 1 - 2 | Roasso Kumamoto | Matsumoto, Nagano |
| 15:00 | Tamabayashi 90+3' | Summary | Saito 27', 80' | Stadium: Matsumotodaira Football Stadium; Attendance: 12,959; Referee: (Japan) Masuya Ueda |

| 20 March 2013 Match 4 | Consadole Sapporo | 1 - 2 | Matsumoto Yamaga | Sapporo |
| 18:00 | Okamoto 62'; Kawai (yellow card) 87' | Summary | Yoon Sung-Yeul (yellow card) 42'; Funayama 71'; Kusunose 72' | Stadium: Sapporo Dome; Attendance: 9,979; Referee: (Japan) Eiji Kawai |

| 24 March 2013 Match 5 | Matsumoto Yamaga | 1 - 1 | V-Varen Nagasaki | Matsumoto, Nagano |
| 15:00 | Funayama 90' (pen.) | Summary | Fujii (yellow card) 60' (yellow-red card); Mizunaga 65' | Stadium: Matsumotodaira Football Stadium; Attendance: 9,038; Referee: (Japan) Maasaki Iemoto |
