= List of Japanese football transfers summer 2012 =

This is a list of Japanese football transfers in the summer transfer window 2012 by club.

== J. League Division 1 ==
=== Albirex Niigata ===
In: Note: Flags indicate national team as defined under FIFA eligibility rules; some limited exceptions apply. Players may hold more than one non-FIFA nationality.

No.	Pos.	Nation	Player
37	DF	JPN	Shusuke Tsubouchi (Transferred from Omiya Ardija)

Out: Note: Flags indicate national team as defined under FIFA eligibility rules; some limited exceptions apply. Players may hold more than one non-FIFA nationality.

No.	Pos.	Nation	Player

=== Kashima Antlers ===
In: Note: Flags indicate national team as defined under FIFA eligibility rules; some limited exceptions apply. Players may hold more than one non-FIFA nationality.

No.	Pos.	Nation	Player
33	MF	BRA	Renato (loan from (China) Guangzhou Evergrande)
—	FW	BRA	Carlão (loan return from (Portugal) S.C. Braga)

Out: Note: Flags indicate national team as defined under FIFA eligibility rules; some limited exceptions apply. Players may hold more than one non-FIFA nationality.

No.	Pos.	Nation	Player
5	DF	BRA	Alex (loan to Tokushima Vortis)
17	FW	JPN	Ryuta Sasaki (loan to Tochigi S.C.)
—	FW	BRA	Carlão (End of Contract)

=== Omiya Ardija ===
In: Note: Flags indicate national team as defined under FIFA eligibility rules; some limited exceptions apply. Players may hold more than one non-FIFA nationality.

No.	Pos.	Nation	Player
3	DF	JPN	Hiroyuki Komoto (loan from Vissel Kobe)
11	FW	SLO	Zlatan Ljubijankič (Transferred from (Belgium) K.A.A. Gent)
19	FW	SLO	Milivoje Novaković (loan from (Germany) 1. FC Köln)
33	MF	KOR	Lee Keun-Ho (Drafted from (South Korea) FC KHT)

Out: Note: Flags indicate national team as defined under FIFA eligibility rules; some limited exceptions apply. Players may hold more than one non-FIFA nationality.

No.	Pos.	Nation	Player
10	FW	BRA	Rafael (Transferred to (Brazil) Botafogo)
14	DF	JPN	Shusuke Tsubouchi (Transferred to Albirex Niigata)
20	DF	KOR	Kim Young-Gwon (Transferred to (China) Guangzhou Evergrande)

=== Cerezo Osaka ===
In: Note: Flags indicate national team as defined under FIFA eligibility rules; some limited exceptions apply. Players may hold more than one non-FIFA nationality.

No.	Pos.	Nation	Player
7	MF	BRA	Fábio Simplício (Transferred from (Italy) A.S. Roma)
16	MF	JPN	Takuma Edamura (loan from Shimizu S-Pulse)
37	MF	BRA	Heberty (loan from Thespa Kusatsu)
41	FW	JPN	Kenyu Sugimoto (loan return from Tokyo Verdy)

Out: Note: Flags indicate national team as defined under FIFA eligibility rules; some limited exceptions apply. Players may hold more than one non-FIFA nationality.

No.	Pos.	Nation	Player
7	MF	KOR	Kim Bo-Kyung (Transferred to (Wales) Cardiff City F.C.)
8	MF	JPN	Hiroshi Kiyotake (Transferred to (Germany) 1. FC Nürnberg)
9	FW	BRA	Kempes (loan return to Portuguesa)
10	MF	BRA	Branquinho (loan to Montedio Yamagata)
19	FW	JPN	Ryo Nagai (loan to (Australia) Perth Glory FC)

=== Consadole Sapporo ===
In Note: Flags indicate national team as defined under FIFA eligibility rules; some limited exceptions apply. Players may hold more than one non-FIFA nationality.

No.	Pos.	Nation	Player
37	MF	BRA	Ramón (Transferred from (Brazil) Náutico)
38	FW	BRA	Tele (Transferred from (Brazil) Foz do Iguaçu)
39	DF	KOR	Kim Jae-Hwan (loan from (South Korea) Jeonbuk Hyundai)

Out Note: Flags indicate national team as defined under FIFA eligibility rules; some limited exceptions apply. Players may hold more than one non-FIFA nationality.

No.	Pos.	Nation	Player
19	FW	BRA	Thiago Quirino (Transferred to Shonan Bellmare)
24	FW	JPN	Junki Yokono (loan to Zweigen Kanazawa)
36	DF	BRA	Juninho (Released)

=== Yokohama F. Marinos ===
In: Note: Flags indicate national team as defined under FIFA eligibility rules; some limited exceptions apply. Players may hold more than one non-FIFA nationality.

No.	Pos.	Nation	Player

Out: Note: Flags indicate national team as defined under FIFA eligibility rules; some limited exceptions apply. Players may hold more than one non-FIFA nationality.

No.	Pos.	Nation	Player

=== Kawasaki Frontale ===
In Note: Flags indicate national team as defined under FIFA eligibility rules; some limited exceptions apply. Players may hold more than one non-FIFA nationality.

No.	Pos.	Nation	Player
31	MF	JPN	Koki Kazama (Transferred from (Germany) TuS Koblenz)
34	MF	JPN	Koya Kazama (Transferred from (Germany) VfL Osnabrück)
35	DF	JPN	Kyotaro Yamakoshi (Drafted from University of Tsukuba)

Out Note: Flags indicate national team as defined under FIFA eligibility rules; some limited exceptions apply. Players may hold more than one non-FIFA nationality.

No.	Pos.	Nation	Player
6	MF	JPN	Yusuke Tasaka (Transferred to (Germany) VfL Bochum)
19	MF	JPN	Kosei Shibasaki (loan to Tokyo Verdy)
24	DF	JPN	Yudai Tanaka (loan to Tochigi S.C.)

=== Gamba Osaka ===
In: Note: Flags indicate national team as defined under FIFA eligibility rules; some limited exceptions apply. Players may hold more than one non-FIFA nationality.

No.	Pos.	Nation	Player
9	FW	BRA	Leandro (loan from (Qatar) Al Sadd SC)
13	DF	JPN	Keisuke Iwashita (loan from Shimizu S-Pulse)
41	MF	JPN	Akihiro Ienaga (loan from (Spain) RCD Mallorca)
—	MF	JPN	Takashi Usami (loan return from (Germany) Bayern Munich)

Out: Note: Flags indicate national team as defined under FIFA eligibility rules; some limited exceptions apply. Players may hold more than one non-FIFA nationality.

No.	Pos.	Nation	Player
9	FW	BRA	Rafinha (loan return to (Brazil) Nacional-SP)
13	MF	JPN	Shinichi Terada (loan to Yokohama F.C.)
24	FW	JPN	Kenta Hoshihara (loan to Mito HollyHock)
37	FW	KOR	Lee Seung-Yeoul (loan to (South Korea) Ulsan Hyundai FC)
—	MF	JPN	Takashi Usami (loan to (Germany) TSG 1899 Hoffenheim)

=== Nagoya Grampus ===
In: Note: Flags indicate national team as defined under FIFA eligibility rules; some limited exceptions apply. Players may hold more than one non-FIFA nationality.

No.	Pos.	Nation	Player

Out: Note: Flags indicate national team as defined under FIFA eligibility rules; some limited exceptions apply. Players may hold more than one non-FIFA nationality.

No.	Pos.	Nation	Player
26	DF	JPN	Tatsuya Arai (loan to F.C. Gifu)

=== Júbilo Iwata ===
In: Note: Flags indicate national team as defined under FIFA eligibility rules; some limited exceptions apply. Players may hold more than one non-FIFA nationality.

No.	Pos.	Nation	Player
28	MF	JPN	Riki Kitawaki (Transferred from (Paraguay) Tacuary)
44	FW	KOR	Han Sang-Woon (Transferred from (South Korea) Seongnam Ilhwa Chunma)
50	MF	JPN	Yuki Kobayashi (loan from Tokyo Verdy)

Out: Note: Flags indicate national team as defined under FIFA eligibility rules; some limited exceptions apply. Players may hold more than one non-FIFA nationality.

No.	Pos.	Nation	Player

=== Urawa Red Diamonds ===
In Note: Flags indicate national team as defined under FIFA eligibility rules; some limited exceptions apply. Players may hold more than one non-FIFA nationality.

No.	Pos.	Nation	Player

Out Note: Flags indicate national team as defined under FIFA eligibility rules; some limited exceptions apply. Players may hold more than one non-FIFA nationality.

No.	Pos.	Nation	Player
4	DF	AUS	Matthew Špiranović (Transferred to (Qatar) Al-Arabi SC)
5	MF	JPN	Shunki Takahashi (loan to JEF United Chiba)
15	FW	JPN	Sergio Escudero (loan to (South Korea) FC Seoul)

=== Kashiwa Reysol ===
In: Note: Flags indicate national team as defined under FIFA eligibility rules; some limited exceptions apply. Players may hold more than one non-FIFA nationality.

No.	Pos.	Nation	Player
11	FW	BRA	Neto Baiano (Transferred from (Brazil) Vitória)

Out: Note: Flags indicate national team as defined under FIFA eligibility rules; some limited exceptions apply. Players may hold more than one non-FIFA nationality.

No.	Pos.	Nation	Player
2	DF	JPN	Takanori Nakajima (loan to Yokohama F.C.)
4	DF	JPN	Hiroki Sakai (Transferred to (Germany) Hannover 96)
9	FW	JPN	Hideaki Kitajima (loan to Roasso Kumamoto)
11	FW	JPN	Ryohei Hayashi (loan to Montedio Yamagata)
25	FW	BRA	Ricardo Lobo (loan to JEF United Chiba)
32	GK	JPN	Yuya Miura (loan to Matsumoto Yamaga)

=== Shimizu S-Pulse ===
In: Note: Flags indicate national team as defined under FIFA eligibility rules; some limited exceptions apply. Players may hold more than one non-FIFA nationality.

No.	Pos.	Nation	Player
35	FW	KOR	Kim Hyun-Sung (loan from (South Korea) FC Seoul)
36	DF	JPN	Kiyotaka Miyoshi (Transferred from (Uruguay) Boston River)
—	MF	KOR	Lee Min-Soo (Drafted from (South Korea) Hannam University)

Out: Note: Flags indicate national team as defined under FIFA eligibility rules; some limited exceptions apply. Players may hold more than one non-FIFA nationality.

No.	Pos.	Nation	Player
5	DF	JPN	Keisuke Iwashita (loan to Gamba Osaka)
7	FW	AUS	Alex Brosque (Transferred to (United Arab Emirates) Al Ain FC)
8	MF	JPN	Takuma Edamura (loan to Cerezo Osaka)
9	FW	BRA	Jymmy França (loan to Tokyo Verdy)
15	DF	JPN	Shinji Tsujio (loan to Sanfrecce Hiroshima)
18	MF	JPN	Shinji Ono (Transferred to (Australia) Western Sydney Wanderers FC)
20	MF	JPN	Akito Tachibana (loan to Matsumoto Yamaga)
—	MF	KOR	Lee Min-Soo (loan to Shonan Bellmare)

=== Sagan Tosu ===
In: Note: Flags indicate national team as defined under FIFA eligibility rules; some limited exceptions apply. Players may hold more than one non-FIFA nationality.

No.	Pos.	Nation	Player

Out: Note: Flags indicate national team as defined under FIFA eligibility rules; some limited exceptions apply. Players may hold more than one non-FIFA nationality.

No.	Pos.	Nation	Player
16	MF	JPN	Takahiro Kuniyoshi (loan to Kataller Toyama)

=== Sanfrecce Hiroshima ===
In: Note: Flags indicate national team as defined under FIFA eligibility rules; some limited exceptions apply. Players may hold more than one non-FIFA nationality.

No.	Pos.	Nation	Player
30	DF	JPN	Shinji Tsujio (loan from Shimizu S-Pulse)
33	DF	JPN	Tsukasa Shiotani (Transferred from Mito HollyHock)

Out: Note: Flags indicate national team as defined under FIFA eligibility rules; some limited exceptions apply. Players may hold more than one non-FIFA nationality.

No.	Pos.	Nation	Player
28	MF	JPN	Takuya Marutani (loan to Oita Trinita)

=== F.C. Tokyo ===
In Note: Flags indicate national team as defined under FIFA eligibility rules; some limited exceptions apply. Players may hold more than one non-FIFA nationality.

No.	Pos.	Nation	Player
9	FW	BRA	Edmilson (loan from (Qatar) Al-Gharafa)
32	MF	SRB	Nemanja Vučićević (Transferred from (Turkey) Manisaspor)

Out Note: Flags indicate national team as defined under FIFA eligibility rules; some limited exceptions apply. Players may hold more than one non-FIFA nationality.

No.	Pos.	Nation	Player
24	FW	JPN	Kentaro Shigematsu (loan to Ventforet Kofu)
28	MF	JPN	Shuto Kono (loan to Machida Zelvia)
29	DF	JPN	Kazunori Yoshimoto (loan to Mito HollyHock)
39	MF	JPN	Tatsuya Yazawa (Transferred to JEF United Chiba)

=== Vegalta Sendai ===
In Note: Flags indicate national team as defined under FIFA eligibility rules; some limited exceptions apply. Players may hold more than one non-FIFA nationality.

No.	Pos.	Nation	Player

Out Note: Flags indicate national team as defined under FIFA eligibility rules; some limited exceptions apply. Players may hold more than one non-FIFA nationality.

No.	Pos.	Nation	Player
—	DF	JPN	Toshio Shimakawa (loan to Blaublitz Akita, previously on loan at Tokyo Verdy)

=== Vissel Kobe ===
In: Note: Flags indicate national team as defined under FIFA eligibility rules; some limited exceptions apply. Players may hold more than one non-FIFA nationality.

No.	Pos.	Nation	Player
31	DF	JPN	Takuya Iwanami (Promoted from youth team)
33	FW	BRA	Fernando (loan from (Brazil) São Caetano)
34	MF	BRA	Anderson (loan from (Brazil) Santos FC)

Out: Note: Flags indicate national team as defined under FIFA eligibility rules; some limited exceptions apply. Players may hold more than one non-FIFA nationality.

No.	Pos.	Nation	Player
5	DF	JPN	Hiroyuki Komoto (loan to Omiya Ardija)
15	MF	JPN	Tsubasa Oya (loan to Fagiano Okayama)

== J. League Division 2 ==
=== Avispa Fukuoka ===
In Note: Flags indicate national team as defined under FIFA eligibility rules; some limited exceptions apply. Players may hold more than one non-FIFA nationality.

No.	Pos.	Nation	Player
39	FW	BRA	Osmar (Transferred from (Brazil) Foz do Iguaçu)

Out Note: Flags indicate national team as defined under FIFA eligibility rules; some limited exceptions apply. Players may hold more than one non-FIFA nationality.

No.	Pos.	Nation	Player

=== Shonan Bellmare ===
In Note: Flags indicate national team as defined under FIFA eligibility rules; some limited exceptions apply. Players may hold more than one non-FIFA nationality.

No.	Pos.	Nation	Player
9	FW	BRA	Thiago Quirino (Transferred from Consadole Sapporo)
24	DF	JPN	Kento Fukuda (loan return from Fujieda MYFC)
28	MF	KOR	Lee Min-Soo (loan from Shimizu S-Pulse)
31	FW	BRA	Alex (Transferred from (Brazil) Grêmio Maringá)

Out Note: Flags indicate national team as defined under FIFA eligibility rules; some limited exceptions apply. Players may hold more than one non-FIFA nationality.

No.	Pos.	Nation	Player
9	FW	BRA	Macena (Released)

=== Ehime F.C. ===
In Note: Flags indicate national team as defined under FIFA eligibility rules; some limited exceptions apply. Players may hold more than one non-FIFA nationality.

No.	Pos.	Nation	Player
34	MF	JPN	Shun Ito (loan from Montedio Yamagata)

Out Note: Flags indicate national team as defined under FIFA eligibility rules; some limited exceptions apply. Players may hold more than one non-FIFA nationality.

No.	Pos.	Nation	Player

=== Fagiano Okayama ===
In Note: Flags indicate national team as defined under FIFA eligibility rules; some limited exceptions apply. Players may hold more than one non-FIFA nationality.

No.	Pos.	Nation	Player
29	MF	JPN	Tsubasa Oya (loan from Vissel Kobe)

Out Note: Flags indicate national team as defined under FIFA eligibility rules; some limited exceptions apply. Players may hold more than one non-FIFA nationality.

No.	Pos.	Nation	Player
30	DF	JPN	Yugo Ichiyanagi (loan to Matsumoto Yamaga)

=== Gainare Tottori ===
In: Note: Flags indicate national team as defined under FIFA eligibility rules; some limited exceptions apply. Players may hold more than one non-FIFA nationality.

No.	Pos.	Nation	Player
13	FW	JPN	Yuichi Kubo (loan from JEF United Ichihara Chiba)
26	DF	JPN	Shuji Fujimoto (loan from JEF United Ichihara Chiba)

Out: Note: Flags indicate national team as defined under FIFA eligibility rules; some limited exceptions apply. Players may hold more than one non-FIFA nationality.

No.	Pos.	Nation	Player
11	FW	CRC	Kenny Cunningham (Released)

=== F.C. Gifu ===
In Note: Flags indicate national team as defined under FIFA eligibility rules; some limited exceptions apply. Players may hold more than one non-FIFA nationality.

No.	Pos.	Nation	Player
32	FW	BRA	Abuda (Transferred from (Brazil) Oeste)
34	DF	JPN	Tatsuya Arai (loan from Nagoya Grampus)
35	FW	BRA	Danilo (Transferred from (Brazil) Jataiense)
36	DF	JPN	Hirofumi Moriyasu (Transferred from (Australia) Sydney FC)

Out Note: Flags indicate national team as defined under FIFA eligibility rules; some limited exceptions apply. Players may hold more than one non-FIFA nationality.

No.	Pos.	Nation	Player
16	DF	KOR	Kim Dong-Gwon (loan to F.C. Osaka)
19	DF	JPN	Shinji Tominari (loan to Fujieda MYFC)
26	MF	JPN	Kazuto Sakamoto (loan to F.C. Kariya)
28	MF	BRA	Bruno (loan to F.C. Suzuka Rampole)

=== Giravanz Kitakyushu ===
In Note: Flags indicate national team as defined under FIFA eligibility rules; some limited exceptions apply. Players may hold more than one non-FIFA nationality.

No.	Pos.	Nation	Player
29	MF	JPN	Shingo Suzuki (loan from Tokyo Verdy)

Out Note: Flags indicate national team as defined under FIFA eligibility rules; some limited exceptions apply. Players may hold more than one non-FIFA nationality.

No.	Pos.	Nation	Player

=== Mito HollyHock ===
In Note: Flags indicate national team as defined under FIFA eligibility rules; some limited exceptions apply. Players may hold more than one non-FIFA nationality.

No.	Pos.	Nation	Player
32	FW	JPN	Kenta Hoshihara (loan from Gamba Osaka)
33	DF	JPN	Kazunori Yoshimoto (loan from F.C. Tokyo)
34	DF	JPN	Junya Hosokawa (Free Agent)

Out Note: Flags indicate national team as defined under FIFA eligibility rules; some limited exceptions apply. Players may hold more than one non-FIFA nationality.

No.	Pos.	Nation	Player
6	DF	JPN	Tsukasa Shiotani (Transferred to Sanfrecce Hiroshima)

=== JEF United Chiba ===
In Note: Flags indicate national team as defined under FIFA eligibility rules; some limited exceptions apply. Players may hold more than one non-FIFA nationality.

No.	Pos.	Nation	Player
33	DF	JPN	Shunki Takahashi (loan from Urawa Red Diamonds)
35	FW	BRA	Ricardo Lobo (loan from Kashiwa Reysol)
39	MF	JPN	Tatsuya Yazawa (Transferred from F.C. Tokyo)

Out Note: Flags indicate national team as defined under FIFA eligibility rules; some limited exceptions apply. Players may hold more than one non-FIFA nationality.

No.	Pos.	Nation	Player
6	DF	AUS	Mark Milligan (Transferred to (Australia) Melbourne Victory)
10	FW	BRA	Reginaldo (loan return to (Italy) A. C. Siena)
22	FW	JPN	Yuichi Kubo (loan to Gainare Tottori)
24	DF	JPN	Shuji Fujimoto (loan to Gainare Tottori)

=== Kataller Toyama ===
In Note: Flags indicate national team as defined under FIFA eligibility rules; some limited exceptions apply. Players may hold more than one non-FIFA nationality.

No.	Pos.	Nation	Player
32	MF	JPN	Takahiro Kuniyoshi (loan from Sagan Tosu)
33	MF	JPN	Shunsuke Tachino (loan from Tokyo Verdy)
41	GK	JPN	Tatsuya Morita (loan from Kyoto Sanga F.C.)

Out Note: Flags indicate national team as defined under FIFA eligibility rules; some limited exceptions apply. Players may hold more than one non-FIFA nationality.

No.	Pos.	Nation	Player

=== Montedio Yamagata ===
In Note: Flags indicate national team as defined under FIFA eligibility rules; some limited exceptions apply. Players may hold more than one non-FIFA nationality.

No.	Pos.	Nation	Player
31	MF	BRA	Branquinho (loan from Cerezo Osaka)
39	FW	JPN	Ryohei Hayashi (loan from Kashiwa Reysol)

Out Note: Flags indicate national team as defined under FIFA eligibility rules; some limited exceptions apply. Players may hold more than one non-FIFA nationality.

No.	Pos.	Nation	Player
10	MF	JPN	Shun Ito (loan to Ehime F.C.)

=== Roasso Kumamoto ===
In Note: Flags indicate national team as defined under FIFA eligibility rules; some limited exceptions apply. Players may hold more than one non-FIFA nationality.

No.	Pos.	Nation	Player
39	FW	JPN	Hideaki Kitajima (loan from Kashiwa Reysol)

Out Note: Flags indicate national team as defined under FIFA eligibility rules; some limited exceptions apply. Players may hold more than one non-FIFA nationality.

No.	Pos.	Nation	Player

=== Kyoto Sanga F.C. ===
In Note: Flags indicate national team as defined under FIFA eligibility rules; some limited exceptions apply. Players may hold more than one non-FIFA nationality.

No.	Pos.	Nation	Player
32	MF	BFA	Wilfried Sanou (Free Agent)

Out Note: Flags indicate national team as defined under FIFA eligibility rules; some limited exceptions apply. Players may hold more than one non-FIFA nationality.

No.	Pos.	Nation	Player
21	GK	JPN	Tatsuya Morita (loan to Kyoto Sanga F.C.)
24	DF	JPN	Yuji Takahashi (loan to (Australia) Brisbane Roar FC)

=== Thespa Kusatsu ===
In Note: Flags indicate national team as defined under FIFA eligibility rules; some limited exceptions apply. Players may hold more than one non-FIFA nationality.

No.	Pos.	Nation	Player
27	FW	BRA	Alex Rafael (Transferred from (Brazil) Comercial-SP)

Out Note: Flags indicate national team as defined under FIFA eligibility rules; some limited exceptions apply. Players may hold more than one non-FIFA nationality.

No.	Pos.	Nation	Player
9	FW	BRA	Lincoln (Released)
10	MF	BRA	Heberty (loan to Cerezo Osaka)

=== Tochigi S.C. ===
In Note: Flags indicate national team as defined under FIFA eligibility rules; some limited exceptions apply. Players may hold more than one non-FIFA nationality.

No.	Pos.	Nation	Player
20	FW	JPN	Ryuta Sasaki (loan from Kashima Antlers)
30	DF	JPN	Yudai Tanaka (loan from Kawasaki Frontale)

Out Note: Flags indicate national team as defined under FIFA eligibility rules; some limited exceptions apply. Players may hold more than one non-FIFA nationality.

No.	Pos.	Nation	Player
—	FW	BRA	Jairo (loan return to (Brazil) Metropolitano)

=== Oita Trinita ===
In Note: Flags indicate national team as defined under FIFA eligibility rules; some limited exceptions apply. Players may hold more than one non-FIFA nationality.

No.	Pos.	Nation	Player
29	FW	JPN	Takenori Hayashi (Transferred from (Thailand) BEC Tero Sasana F.C.)
33	MF	JPN	Takuya Marutani (loan from Sanfrecce Hiroshima)

Out Note: Flags indicate national team as defined under FIFA eligibility rules; some limited exceptions apply. Players may hold more than one non-FIFA nationality.

No.	Pos.	Nation	Player
2	DF	JPN	Yuji Fujikawa (loan to Matsumoto Yamaga)
26	FW	JPN	Yusuke Goto (loan to Hoyo Oita)

=== Ventforet Kofu ===
In Note: Flags indicate national team as defined under FIFA eligibility rules; some limited exceptions apply. Players may hold more than one non-FIFA nationality.

No.	Pos.	Nation	Player
20	MF	BRA	Fernandinho (Transferred from (Brazil) Mogi Mirim)
32	FW	JPN	Kentaro Shigematsu (loan from F.C. Tokyo)

Out Note: Flags indicate national team as defined under FIFA eligibility rules; some limited exceptions apply. Players may hold more than one non-FIFA nationality.

No.	Pos.	Nation	Player
20	MF	BRA	Pimba (Released)

=== Tokyo Verdy ===
In Note: Flags indicate national team as defined under FIFA eligibility rules; some limited exceptions apply. Players may hold more than one non-FIFA nationality.

No.	Pos.	Nation	Player
7	MF	JPN	Kosei Shibasaki (loan from Kawasaki Frontale)
29	DF	BRA	Nicollas (loan from (Brazil) Flamengo)
42	DF	KOR	Bae Dae-Won (Free Agent)
45	FW	BRA	Jymmy França (loan from Shimizu S-Pulse)
50	FW	JPN	Ryosuke Kijima (Transferred from Matsumoto Yamaga)

Out Note: Flags indicate national team as defined under FIFA eligibility rules; some limited exceptions apply. Players may hold more than one non-FIFA nationality.

No.	Pos.	Nation	Player
10	MF	JPN	Yuki Kobayashi (loan to Júbilo Iwata)
13	MF	JPN	Shingo Suzuki (loan to Giravanz Kitakyushu)
15	FW	BRA	Josimar (Released)
27	DF	JPN	Shunsuke Tachino (loan to Kataller Toyama)
29	DF	JPN	Toshio Shimakawa (loan return to Vegalta Sendai)
41	FW	JPN	Kenyu Sugimoto (loan return to Cerezo Osaka)

=== Tokushima Vortis ===
In Note: Flags indicate national team as defined under FIFA eligibility rules; some limited exceptions apply. Players may hold more than one non-FIFA nationality.

No.	Pos.	Nation	Player
26	DF	BRA	Alex (loan from Kashima Antlers)

Out Note: Flags indicate national team as defined under FIFA eligibility rules; some limited exceptions apply. Players may hold more than one non-FIFA nationality.

No.	Pos.	Nation	Player

=== Matsumoto Yamaga ===
In Note: Flags indicate national team as defined under FIFA eligibility rules; some limited exceptions apply. Players may hold more than one non-FIFA nationality.

No.	Pos.	Nation	Player
9	FW	BRA	Allisson Ricardo (loan from (Brazil) Audax)
10	MF	BRA	Thiago Silva (Transferred from (Brazil) Central)
22	MF	JPN	Akito Tachibana (loan from Shimizu S-Pulse)
24	DF	JPN	Yuji Fujikawa (loan from Oita Trinita)
31	GK	JPN	Yuya Miura (loan from Kashiwa Reysol)
34	DF	JPN	Yugo Ichiyanagi (loan from Fagiano Okayama)
37	MF	KOR	Yoon Sung-Yeul (Free Agent)
39	FW	KOR	Choi Su-Bin (Free Agent)

Out Note: Flags indicate national team as defined under FIFA eligibility rules; some limited exceptions apply. Players may hold more than one non-FIFA nationality.

No.	Pos.	Nation	Player
6	MF	JPN	Shota Imai (loan to Blaublitz Akita)
9	FW	BRA	Eydison (Released)
17	MF	JPN	Ken Hisatomi (loan to Fujieda MYFC)
22	DF	JPN	Masaki Yoshida (loan to F.C. Ryūkyū)
24	DF	KOR	Lee Jong-min (Released)
33	FW	JPN	Ryosuke Kijima (Transferred to Tokyo Verdy)

=== Yokohama F.C. ===
In Note: Flags indicate national team as defined under FIFA eligibility rules; some limited exceptions apply. Players may hold more than one non-FIFA nationality.

No.	Pos.	Nation	Player
15	DF	JPN	Takanori Nakajima (loan from Kashiwa Reysol)
40	MF	JPN	Shinichi Terada (loan from Gamba Osaka)

Out Note: Flags indicate national team as defined under FIFA eligibility rules; some limited exceptions apply. Players may hold more than one non-FIFA nationality.

No.	Pos.	Nation	Player
3	MF	BRA	Roberto (Retired)

=== Machida Zelvia ===
In Note: Flags indicate national team as defined under FIFA eligibility rules; some limited exceptions apply. Players may hold more than one non-FIFA nationality.

No.	Pos.	Nation	Player
24	DF	JPN	Katsuya Senzaki (Transferred from Vanraure Hachinohe)
29	DF	KOR	Lee Gang-Jin (loan from (South Korea) Jeonbuk Hyundai)
33	MF	JPN	Shuto Kono (loan from F.C. Tokyo)

Out Note: Flags indicate national team as defined under FIFA eligibility rules; some limited exceptions apply. Players may hold more than one non-FIFA nationality.

No.	Pos.	Nation	Player
8	MF	JPN	Takumi Ogawa (loan to Fujieda MYFC)
26	MF	SCO	Colin Marshall (Released)
