= 2014 Matsumoto Yamaga FC season =

Matsumoto Yamaga
2014 season
- Chairman: Hiroshi Otsuki
- Manager: Yasuharu Sorimachi
- J. League Division 2: 2nd
- Emperor's Cup: 3rd round
- Top goalscorer: League: Takayuki Funayama (19 goals); All: Takayuki Funayama (19 goals)
- Highest home attendance: 18,496 vs Mito HollyHock (23 November 2014)
- Lowest home attendance: 8,608 vs Tochigi SC (10 August 2014)
- Average home league attendance: 12,733

The 2014 Matsumoto Yamaga FC season sees Matsumoto Yamaga compete in J. League Division 2. Matsumoto Yamaga are also competing in the 2014 Emperor's Cup.

When they made a 2–1 victory at Fukuoka on 1 November 2014, they secured a second place in J2 and promotion to J1 for the first time in their history.

== Players ==
=== Pre-season Transfers ===
(substituted in) In
No.	Pos.	Player	From	Notes
2	DF	(Japan) Yuki Okubo	Tokushima Vortis	
3	DF	(Japan) Hayuma Tanaka	Nagoya Grampus	
15	MF	(Japan) Yudai Iwama	V-Varen Nagasaki	
26	MF	(Japan) Hayato Michiue	Momoyama Gakuin University	
29	MF	(Japan) Junto Matsushita	Keio University	
34	MF	(Japan) Nobuyuki Shiina	Ryutsu Keizai University	
41	MF	(Japan) Daiki Yagishita	Teikyo Senior High School	
9	FW	(Brazil) Sabiá	Tochigi SC	
18	FW	(Japan) Yuki Natsume	Kawasaki Frontale	

(substituted off) Out
No.	Pos.	Player	To	Notes
(loan return from FC Ryūkyū)	DF	(Japan) Ryuji Ito	Fujieda MYFC	
15	DF	(Japan) Ryosuke Kawanabe	AC Nagano Parceiro	
(loan return from Fukushima United FC)	DF	(Japan) Shusaku Tokita	Grulla Morioka	on loan
41	DF	(Japan) Yuki Miyazawa	Sriracha F.C.	
49	DF	(Japan) Takumi Abe	Avispa Fukuoka	
(loan return from Fujieda MYFC)	MF	(Japan) Yuta Murase	ReinMeer Aomori F.C.	
(loan return from Fujieda MYFC)	MF	(Japan) Kosei Arita	Matsue City F.C.	
8	MF	(Japan) Kento Tsurumaki	Ayutthaya F.C.	
18	MF	(Japan) Akihito Kusunose		
30	MF	(Japan) Ryota Iwabuchi	Renofa Yamaguchi FC	on loan
34	MF	(Japan) Makito Yoshida	Nagoya Grampus	loan return
9	FW	(Brazil) Rodrigo Cabeça	Desportivo Brasil	loan return
20	FW	(Japan) Shun Nagasawa	Shimizu S-Pulse	loan return
33	FW	(Japan) Ryota Nakamura	FC Osaka	on loan
48	FW	(Brazil) Felipe Alves	Avaí Futebol Clube	loan return

=== Mid-season Transfers ===
(substituted in) In
No.	Pos.	Player	From	Notes
20	FW	(Japan) Hiroki Yamamoto	Vegalta Sendai	on loan
22	FW	(South Korea) Lee JunHyeob	Eintracht Braunschweig II	

(substituted off) Out
No.	Pos.	Player	To	Notes
5	MF	(Japan) Kenta Komatsu	Ayutthaya F.C.	
24	MF	(South Korea) Park Kwang-il	FC Pune City	on loan
29	MF	(Japan) Junto Matsushita	FC Machida Zelvia	on loan
32	MF	(Japan) Kohei Kurata	Azulclaro Numazu	on loan
36	MF	(Japan) Shuho Miyashita	Saurcos Fukui	on loan
37	MF	(Japan) Mitsuo Yamada		retired
39	FW	(Japan) Miran Kibe		retired

== Competitions ==
=== J. League ===
==== League table ====
Pos	Team	Pld	W	D	L	GF	GA	GD	Pts	Promotion or relegation
1	Shonan Bellmare (C, P)	42	31	8	3	86	25	+61	101	Qualification for 2015 J1 League
2	Matsumoto Yamaga (P)	42	24	11	7	65	35	+30	83	Qualification for 2015 J1 League
3	JEF United Chiba	42	18	14	10	55	44	+11	68	Qualification for Promotion Playoffs (Note: Only teams that meet J1 license criteria can participate in promotion playoffs. If one or more teams fail to meet the criteria, only eligible teams that finished 3rd to 6th will participate and no replacement teams will be added.)
4	Júbilo Iwata	42	18	13	11	67	55	+12	67	Qualification for Promotion Playoffs
5	Giravanz Kitakyushu	42	18	11	13	50	50	0	65	Ineligible for promotion

Updated to match(es) played on 23 November 2014. Source: J.League data
Rules for classification: 1) points; 2) goal difference; 3) number of goals scored.
(C) Champions; (P) Promoted
