= Yōsuke Nozawa =

Japanese footballer

Personal information
- Date of birth: November 9, 1979 (age 46)
- Place of birth: Shizuoka, Shizuoka, Japan
- Height: 1.81 m (5 ft 11 1/2 in)
- Position: Goalkeeper

Youth career
- 1995–1997: Shimizu S-Pulse

Senior career*
Years	Team	Apps	(Gls)
1998–1999	Shimizu S-Pulse	0	(0)
2000–2008	Albirex Niigata	188	(0)
2009–2011	Shonan Bellmare	69	(0)
2012–2014	Matsumoto Yamaga FC	36	(0)
2015–2018	Albirex Niigata Singapore	94	(0)
2019	Albirex Niigata	1	(0)
Total		387	(0)
Medal record
Shimizu S-Pulse
Runner-up	J1 League	1999
Runner-up	Emperor's Cup	1998
- * Club domestic league appearances and goals as of end of 2019 season

Yosuke Nozawa (野澤 洋輔, Nozawa Yōsuke; born November 9, 1979) is a Japanese retired football player.

== Playing career ==
Nozawa was born in Shizuoka on November 9, 1979. He joined J1 League club Shimizu S-Pulse from youth team in 1998. However he could not play at all in the match behind Masanori Sanada in 2 seasons.

=== Albirex Niigata ===
In 2000, he moved to J2 League club Albirex Niigata. Although he could not play at all in the match in 2000, he became a regular goalkeeper from 2001. The club won the champions in 2003 and was promoted to J1 from 2004. However his opportunity to play decreased behind Takashi Kitano from 2006.

=== Shonan Bellmare ===
In 2009, he moved to J2 club Shonan Bellmare. In 2009, he played full time in all matches and the club was promoted to J1 from 2010. However he lost his regular position after suffering a spinal disc herniation in 2010 and he could not play at throughout 2011 which Yohei Nishibe take his place as the main goalkeeper.

=== Matsumoto Yamaga FC ===
In 2012, he moved to Matsumoto Yamaga FC. Although he played many matches in 2012, he could hardly play in the match for spinal disc herniation from the 2013 season onwards.

=== Albirex Niigata Singapore ===
In 2015, Nozawa moved to Albirex Niigata Singapore to play in the S.League. He has won 13th title within 4 Years at the club.

=== Albirex Niigata ===
In 2019, he returned to Japan and signed with J2 League club Albirex Niigata for the first time in 11 years. On 24 November 2019, he make his only appearance in the club last matchday fixture in a 2-1 win against V-Varen Nagasaki. He announced his retirement on 17 December 2019.

== Club statistics ==
As of end of 2018 season

Club performance			League		Cup		League Cup		Total	
Season	Club	League	Apps	Goals	Apps	Goals	Apps	Goals	Apps	Goals
Japan			League		Emperor's Cup		J.League Cup		Total	
1998	Shimizu S-Pulse	J1 League	0	0	0	0	0	0	0	0
1999	Shimizu S-Pulse	J1 League	0	0	0	0	0	0	0	0
2000	Albirex Niigata	J2 League	0	0	0	0	0	0	0	0
2001	Albirex Niigata	J2 League	44	0	2	0	1	0	47	0
2002	Albirex Niigata	J2 League	43	0	1	0	-		44	0
2003	Albirex Niigata	J2 League	44	0	2	0	-		46	0
2004	Albirex Niigata	J1 League	19	0	1	0	6	0	26	0
2005	Albirex Niigata	J1 League	26	0	1	0	6	0	33	0
2006	Albirex Niigata	J1 League	10	0	0	0	2	0	12	0
2007	Albirex Niigata	J1 League	0	0	0	0	0	0	0	0
2008	Albirex Niigata	J1 League	2	0	0	0	2	0	4	0
2009	Shonan Bellmare	J2 League	51	0	0	0	-		51	0
2010	Shonan Bellmare	J1 League	18	0	2	0	1	0	21	0
2011	Shonan Bellmare	J2 League	0	0	2	0	-		2	0
2012	Matsumoto Yamaga FC	J2 League	29	0	0	0	-		29	0
2013	Matsumoto Yamaga FC	J2 League	6	0	0	0	-		6	0
2014	Matsumoto Yamaga FC	J2 League	1	0	0	0	-		1	0
Singapore			League		Singapore Cup		League Cup		Total	
2015	Albirex Niigata Singapore	S.League	27	0	6	0	4	0	37	0
2016	Albirex Niigata Singapore	S.League	21	0	3	0	3	0	27	0
2017	Albirex Niigata Singapore	S.League	22	0	5	0	5	0	32	0
2018	Albirex Niigata Singapore	Premier League	24	0	5	0	0	0	29	0
Japan			League		Emperor's Cup		J.League Cup		Total	
2019	Albirex Niigata	J2 League					-			
Career total			387	0	30	0	30	0	447	0

== Honours ==
=== Club ===
Albirex Niigata

- J2 League: 2003

Albirex Niigata Singapore

- S.League: 2016, 2017, 2018
- Singapore Cup: 2015, 2016, 2017, 2018
- Singapore Community Shield: 2016, 2017, 2018
- Singapore League Cup: 2015, 2016, 2017

=== Individual ===
- Singapore Premier League Team of the Year: 2018
- S.League Golden Glove: 2015, 2016, 2017, 2018
