= Kazuya Iio =

Japanese footballer

Kazuya Iio 飯尾 和也
Personal information
- Full name: Kazuya Iio
- Date of birth: April 10, 1980 (age 46)
- Place of birth: Nerima, Tokyo, Japan
- Height: 1.77 m (5 ft 9 1/2 in)
- Position: Defender

Youth career
- 1996–1998: Verdy Kawasaki

Senior career*
Years	Team	Apps	(Gls)
1999	Verdy Kawasaki	1	(0)
2000–2002	Vegalta Sendai	60	(0)
2003	Okinawa Kariyushi FC		
2004	Shizuoka FC		
2005–2010	Sagan Tosu	197	(12)
2011	Yokohama FC	6	(0)
2011–2014	Matsumoto Yamaga FC	64	(3)
Total		328	(15)
- * Club domestic league appearances and goals

Kazuya Iio (飯尾 和也, Iio Kazuya; born April 10, 1980) is a former Japanese football player.

== Playing career ==
Iio was born in Nerima, Tokyo on April 10, 1980. He joined the J1 League club Verdy Kawasaki in 1999. On August 7, he debuted as defensive midfielder against Gamba Osaka. However, he did not play in any other matches. In 2000, he moved to the J2 League club Vegalta Sendai. He became a regular player as center back and the club was promoted to J1 in 2002. However, he did not play in many matches in 2002 and left the club at the end of the 2002 season. After the Regional Leagues club Okinawa Kariyushi FC (2003) and Shizuoka FC (2004), he joined the J2 club Sagan Tosu in 2005. He became a regular player and played often as center back for a long time. However, his playing time decreased in 2010. In 2011, he moved to the J2 club Yokohama FC, though he did not play much. In August 2011, he moved to the Japan Football League club Matsumoto Yamaga FC. He played often as regular center back and the club was promoted to J2 in 2012. He did not play as much in 2013 and retired at the end of the 2014 season.

== Club statistics ==
Club performance			League		Cup		League Cup		Total	
Season	Club	League	Apps	Goals	Apps	Goals	Apps	Goals	Apps	Goals
Japan			League		Emperor's Cup		J.League Cup		Total	
1999	Verdy Kawasaki	J1 League	1	0	0	0	0	0	1	0
2000	Vegalta Sendai	J2 League	35	0	2	0	2	0	39	0
2001	Vegalta Sendai	J2 League	25	0	0	0	1	0	26	0
2002	Vegalta Sendai	J2 League	0	0	0	0	2	0	2	0
2003	Okinawa Kariyushi FC	Regional Leagues					-			
2004	Shizuoka FC	Regional Leagues					-			
2005	Sagan Tosu	J2 League	37	1	1	0	-		38	1
2006	Sagan Tosu	J2 League	25	2	2	1	-		27	3
2007	Sagan Tosu	J2 League	35	1	2	0	-		37	1
2008	Sagan Tosu	J2 League	36	4	4	0	-		40	4
2009	Sagan Tosu	J2 League	48	3	2	0	-		50	3
2010	Sagan Tosu	J2 League	15	1	1	0	-		16	1
2011	Yokohama FC	J2 League	6	0	0	0	-		6	0
2011	Matsumoto Yamaga FC	Football League	12	0	4	0	-		16	0
2012	Matsumoto Yamaga FC	J2 League	41	3	0	0	-		41	3
2013	Matsumoto Yamaga FC	J2 League	6	0	0	0	-		6	0
2014	Matsumoto Yamaga FC	J2 League	5	0	0	0	-		5	0
Career total			328	15	18	1	5	0	351	16
