= Takuro Kikuoka =

Japanese footballer

Takuro Kikuoka 菊岡 拓朗
Personal information
- Full name: Takuro Kikuoka
- Date of birth: 30 June 1985 (age 41)
- Place of birth: Fuji, Shizuoka, Japan
- Height: 1.63 m (5 ft 4 in)
- Position: Midfielder

Team information
- Current team: ReinMeer Aomori
- Number: 28

Youth career
- 2004–2007: Hosei University

Senior career*
Years	Team	Apps	(Gls)
2008–2009	Mito HollyHock	28	(2)
2010–2011	Tokyo Verdy	69	(11)
2012–2013	Tochigi SC	74	(9)
2014–2015	Consadole Sapporo	30	(0)
2016–2018	SC Sagamihara	75	(2)
2019–	ReinMeer Aomori	28	(4)
- * Club domestic league appearances and goals as of 23 February 2020

Takuro Kikuoka (菊岡 拓朗, Kikuoka Takurō; born 30 June 1985) is a Japanese football player who plays for ReinMeer Aomori.

== Club statistics ==
Updated to 23 February 2020.

Club performance			League		Cup		Total	
Season	Club	League	Apps	Goals	Apps	Goals	Apps	Goals
Japan			League		Emperor's Cup		Total	
2008	Mito HollyHock	J2 League	28	2	1	0	29	2
2009	Mito HollyHock	J2 League	40	4	1	0	41	4
2010	Tokyo Verdy	J2 League	34	3	0	0	34	3
2011	Tokyo Verdy	J2 League	35	8	1	1	36	9
2012	Tochigi SC	J2 League	39	7	1	0	40	7
2013	Tochigi SC	J2 League	35	2	2	2	37	4
2014	Consadole Sapporo	J2 League	22	0	2	0	24	0
2015	Consadole Sapporo	J2 League	8	0	0	0	8	0
2016	SC Sagamihara	J3 League	30	0	–		30	0
2017	SC Sagamihara	J3 League	26	1	–		26	1
2018	SC Sagamihara	J3 League	19	1	–		19	1
2019	ReinMeer Aomori	JFL	28	4	–		28	4
Total			304	28	8	3	312	31
