= Na Sung-soo =

South Korean footballer

Personal information
- Full name: Na Sung-soo
- Date of birth: August 13, 1993 (age 33)
- Place of birth: Seoul, South Korea
- Height: 1.70 m (5 ft 7 in)
- Position: Midfielder

Team information
- Current team: Yokohama FC
- Number: 23

Senior career*
Years	Team	Apps	(Gls)
2012–	Yokohama FC	20	(0)
- * Club domestic league appearances and goals as of 23 February 2016

Na Sung-soo (born August 13, 1993) is a South Korean football player for Yokohama FC.

== Club statistics ==
Updated to 23 February 2016.

Club performance			League		Cup		Total	
Season	Club	League	Apps	Goals	Apps	Goals	Apps	Goals
Japan			League		Emperor's Cup		Total	
2012	Yokohama FC	J2 League	0	0	0	0	0	0
2013	Yokohama FC	J2 League	10	0	1	0	11	0
2014	Yokohama FC	J2 League	9	0	0	0	9	0
2015	Yokohama FC	J2 League	1	0	0	0	1	0
Career total			20	0	1	0	21	0
