= Yoo Dae-hyun =

South Korean footballer (born 1990)

Personal information
- Full name: Yoo Dae-hyun
- Date of birth: 28 February 1990 (age 36)
- Place of birth: South Korea
- Height: 1.75 m (5 ft 9 in)
- Position: Full back

Team information
- Current team: Bucheon FC 1995
- Number: 22

Youth career
- 2009–2011: Korea University

Senior career*
Years	Team	Apps	(Gls)
2012	Tochigi SC	8	(0)
2013	FC Machida Zelvia	9	(0)
2014–	Bucheon FC	77	(0)

International career
2006–2007	South Korea U-17		
- * Club domestic league appearances and goals as of 1 November 2016

Yoo Dae-hyun (Korean: 유대현; born 28 February 1990) is a South Korean footballer who plays as full back for Bucheon FC in K League Challenge.

== Career ==
Yoo joined Tochigi SC in 2012 but left the team two years later. He made only 8 appearances in J2 League.

He was selected by Bucheon FC 1995 in the 2014 K League draft.

== Club statistics ==
Club performance			League		Cup		Total	
Season	Club	League	Apps	Goals	Apps	Goals	Apps	Goals
Japan			League		Emperor's Cup		Total	
2012	Tochigi SC	J2 League						
Country	Japan							
Total								
