= Cha Young-hwan =

South Korean footballer

Cha Young-Hwan
Personal information
- Full name: Cha Young-Hwan
- Date of birth: July 16, 1990 (age 36)
- Place of birth: South Korea
- Height: 1.83 m (6 ft 0 in)
- Position: Midfielder

Team information
- Current team: Yangju Citizen FC

Senior career*
| Years | Team | Apps | (Gls) |
| 2012–2014 | Tochigi SC | 99 | (4) |
| 2015 | Zweigen Kanazawa | 35 | (3) |
| 2016–2019 | Busan IPark | 59 | (3) |
| 2018–2019 | → Sangju Sangmu (loan) | 8 | (0) |
| 2020 | Chungnam Asan FC | 17 | (0) |
| 2021 | Changwon City FC | 23 | (0) |
| 2022- | Yangju Citizen FC | 21 | (0) |
- * Club domestic league appearances and goals as of 6 February 2019

Cha Young-Hwan (Korean: 차영환; born July 16, 1990) is a South Korean football player who plays as a defensive midfielder or centre-back for Yangju Citizen FC.

== Club statistics ==
| Club performance | | | League | | Cup | | Intercontinental | | Total | |
| Season | Club | League | Apps | Goals | Apps | Goals | Apps | Goals | Apps | Goals |
|---|---|---|---|---|---|---|---|---|---|---|
| 2012 | Tochigi SC | J2 League | 24 | 2 | 0 | 0 | - | - | 24 | 2 |
| 2013 | Tochigi SC | J2 League | 41 | 1 | 0 | 0 | - | - | 41 | 1 |
| 2014 | Tochigi SC | J2 League | 34 | 1 | 0 | 0 | - | - | 34 | 1 |
| 2015 | Zweigen Kanazawa | J2 League | 35 | 3 | 0 | 0 | - | - | 35 | 3 |
| 2016 | Busan IPark | K League 2 | 33 | 1 | 1 | 0 | - | - | 34 | 1 |
| 2017 | Busan IPark | K League 2 | 26 | 2 | 4 | 0 | - | - | 30 | 2 |
| Career total | | | 193 | 10 | 5 | 0 | 0 | 0 | 198 | 10 |
