= Hiroshi Tetsuto =

Japanese footballer

Personal information
- Full name: Hiroshi Tetsuto
- Date of birth: September 28, 1982 (age 44)
- Place of birth: Kamimashiki District, Kumamoto, Japan
- Height: 1.68 m (5 ft 6 in)
- Position: Defender

Team information
- Current team: Matsumoto Yamaga
- Number: 16

Youth career
- 1998–2000: Kumamoto Commercial High School
- 2001–2004: Saga University

Senior career*
Years	Team	Apps	(Gls)
2005–2006	Saga Nanyo		
2006–2008	Sagan Tosu	45	(0)
2009–	Matsumoto Yamaga	145	(9)
- * Club domestic league appearances and goals as of 23 February 2016

Hiroshi Tetsuto (鐡戸 裕史, Tetsuto Hiroshi; born September 28, 1982 in Kamimashiki District, Kumamoto, Japan) is a Japanese football player currently playing for Matsumoto Yamaga F.C. He previously played for J. League division 2 side Sagan Tosu as DF and MF.

After graduating from high school, he entered Saga University and joined its soccer club. As a senior in 2004, he was made the team's captain. After graduating Saga University, he chose to continue training to become a professional rather than seek employment. He received an amateur contract in 2006. and his first professional contract in 2007.

== Club career statistics ==
Updated to 23 February 2016.

Appearances and goals by club, season and competition
Club	Season	League			Emperor's Cup		J.League Cup		Total	
Club	Season	Division	Apps	Goals	Apps	Goals	Apps	Goals	Apps	Goals
Sagan Tosu	2006	J2 League	3	0	0	0	—		3	0
Sagan Tosu	2007	J2 League	20	0	2	0	—		22	0
Sagan Tosu	2008	J2 League	22	0	1	0	—		23	0
Matsumoto Yamaga	2009	JRL	4	1	3	0	—		7	1
Matsumoto Yamaga	2010	JFL	30	1	1	0	—		31	1
Matsumoto Yamaga	2011	JFL	28	2	2	0	—		30	2
Matsumoto Yamaga	2012	J2 League	37	3	0	0	—		37	3
Matsumoto Yamaga	2013	J2 League	22	2	2	0	—		24	2
Matsumoto Yamaga	2014	J2 League	19	0	1	0	—		20	0
Matsumoto Yamaga	2015	J1 League	5	0	0	0	5	0	10	0
Career total			190	9	12	0	5	0	207	9
