= Kohei Kurata =

Japanese footballer

Kohei Kurata 蔵田岬平
Personal information
- Full name: Kohei Kurata
- Date of birth: September 22, 1990 (age 36)
- Place of birth: Uki, Kumamoto, Japan
- Height: 1.75 m (5 ft 9 in)
- Position: Midfielder

Team information
- Current team: Saurcos Fukui
- Number: 11

Youth career
- 2009–2012: Kansai University of International Studies

Senior career*
Years	Team	Apps	(Gls)
2013–2016	Matsumoto Yamaga	2	(0)
2014–2016	→ Azul Claro Numazu (loan)	45	(16)
2017	Azul Claro Numazu	0	(0)
2018–	Saurcos Fukui		
- * Club domestic league appearances and goals as of 23 February 2018

Kohei Kurata (蔵田 岬平, Kurata Kōhei; born September 22, 1990) is a Japanese football player. He plays for Saurcos Fukui.

== Playing career ==
Kohei Kurata played for J2 League club Matsumoto Yamaga FC from 2013 to 2014. Then he moved to Azul Claro Numazu mid-season.

== Club statistics ==
Updated to 23 February 2018.

Club performance			League		Cup		Total	
Season	Club	League	Apps	Goals	Apps	Goals	Apps	Goals
Japan			League		Emperor's Cup		Total	
2013	Matsumoto Yamaga	J2 League	2	0	1	1	3	1
2014	Matsumoto Yamaga	J2 League	0	0	–		0	0
2014	Azul Claro Numazu	JFL	12	6	–		12	6
2015	Azul Claro Numazu	JFL	29	7	–		29	7
2016	Azul Claro Numazu	JFL	4	3	–		4	3
2017	Azul Claro Numazu	J3 League	0	0	0	0	0	0
Career total			47	16	1	1	48	17
