= Masaki Iida =

Japanese footballer

Masaki Iida 飯田 真輝
Personal information
- Full name: Masaki Iida
- Date of birth: 15 September 1985 (age 41)
- Place of birth: Toride, Ibaraki, Japan
- Height: 1.85 m (6 ft 1 in)
- Position: Centre back

Team information
- Current team: Nara Club
- Number: 38

Youth career
- 2001–2003: RKU Kashiwa High School

Senior career*
Years	Team	Apps	(Gls)
2005–2007	Ryutsu Keizai University	29	(4)
2006	→ Tokyo Verdy (loan)	2	(0)
2008–2010	Tokyo Verdy	6	(0)
2010–2019	Matsumoto Yamaga	348	(37)
2020	Maruyasu Okazaki	11	(0)
2021–	Nara Club	6	(1)
- * Club domestic league appearances and goals as of 18:46, 13 May 2021 (UTC)

Masaki Iida (飯田 真輝, Iida Masaki; born 15 September 1985 in Ibaraki) is a Japanese football player for Nara Club.

== Club statistics ==
Updated to 24 February 2019.

Club performance			League		Cup		League Cup		Total	
Season	Club	League	Apps	Goals	Apps	Goals	Apps	Goals	Apps	Goals
Japan			League		Emperor's Cup		J. League Cup		Total	
2005	Ryutsu Keizai University	JFL	12	2	-		-		12	2
2006	Ryutsu Keizai University	JFL	8	0	1	0	-		9	0
2007	Tokyo Verdy	J2 League	2	0	0	0	-		2	0
2007	Ryutsu Keizai University	JFL	9	2	1	1	-		10	3
2008	Tokyo Verdy	J1 League	2	0	0	0	2	0	4	0
2009	Tokyo Verdy	J2 League	4	0	0	0	-		4	0
2010	Tokyo Verdy	J2 League	0	0	-		-		0	0
2010	Matsumoto Yamaga	JFL	11	0	2	0	-		13	0
2011	Matsumoto Yamaga	JFL	31	8	1	0	-		32	8
2012	Matsumoto Yamaga	J2 League	39	1	1	0	-		40	1
2013	Matsumoto Yamaga	J2 League	41	5	1	0	-		42	5
2014	Matsumoto Yamaga	J2 League	42	6	1	0	-		43	6
2015	Matsumoto Yamaga	J1 League	34	2	4	1	1	0	39	3
2016	Matsumoto Yamaga	J2 League	41	7	2	0	-		43	7
2017	Matsumoto Yamaga	J2 League	41	3	0	0	-		41	3
2018	Matsumoto Yamaga	J2 League	41	3	0	0	-		41	3
2019	Matsumoto Yamaga	J1 League	29	2	1	1	2	0	32	3
2020	FC Maruyasu Okazaki	JFL	11	0	3	0	-		14	0
2021	Nara Club	JFL	29	1	-		-		29	1
Total			427	42	18	3	5	0	450	45
