= Shingo Kukita =

Japanese footballer (born 1988)

Shingo Kukita 久木田紳吾
Personal information
- Full name: Shingo Kukita
- Date of birth: 24 September 1988 (age 38)
- Place of birth: Kumamoto, Japan
- Height: 1.80 m (5 ft 11 in)
- Positions: Centre back; striker

Youth career
- 2004–2006: Kumamoto High School
- 2007–2010: University of Tokyo

Senior career*
Years	Team	Apps	(Gls)
2010–2017	Fagiano Okayama	145	(12)
2012	→ Matsumoto Yamaga (loan)	7	(0)
2018–2019	Thespakusatsu Gunma	43	(1)
- * Club domestic league appearances and goals as of 10 January 2020

Shingo Kukita (久木田 紳吾, Kukita Shingo; born September 24, 1988) is a Japanese former footballer who last played for Thespakusatsu Gunma.

== Career ==
Prior to turning professional, Kukita played football for the University of Tokyo. He retired at the end of the 2019 season.

== Career statistics ==
Updated to 23 February 2018.

Club	Season	League		Emperor's Cup		Total	
Club	Season	Apps	Goals	Apps	Goals	Apps	Goals
Fagiano Okayama	2010	4	0	0	0	4	0
Fagiano Okayama	2011	27	4	2	0	29	4
Matsumoto Yamaga	2012	7	0	0	0	7	0
Fagiano Okayama	2013	29	3	2	0	31	3
Fagiano Okayama	2014	37	3	1	0	38	3
Fagiano Okayama	2015	21	0	0	0	21	0
Fagiano Okayama	2016	0	0	0	0	0	0
Fagiano Okayama	2017	27	2	1	0	28	2
Career total		152	12	6	0	158	12
