= Shogo Shiozawa =

Japanese footballer (born 1982)

Personal information
- Date of birth: September 9, 1982 (age 44)
- Place of birth: Sanada, Nagano, Japan
- Height: 1.82 m (6 ft 0 in)
- Position: Forward

Team information
- Current team: Nagano Parceiro
- Number: 9

Youth career
- 1998–2000: Ueda Highschool
- 2002–2005: Yamagata University

Senior career*
Years	Team	Apps	(Gls)
2001	FC Ueda Gentian		
2006–2008	Mito HollyHock	73	(8)
2009–2010	Sagawa Printing	46	(24)
2011–2015	Matsumoto Yamaga FC	125	(26)
2016–	AC Nagano Parceiro		
- * Club domestic league appearances and goals as of 23 February 2016

Shogo Shiozawa (塩沢 勝吾, Shiozawa Shogo; born September 9, 1982 in Nagano) is a Japanese football player who currently plays for AC Nagano Parceiro.

== Career ==
He led the Japan Football League in scoring for the 2009 season. Shiozawa previously played for Mito Hollyhock in the J. League Division 2.

== Club career statistics ==
Updated to 23 February 2016.

Club performance			League		Cup		League Cup		Total	
Season	Club	League	Apps	Goals	Apps	Goals	Apps	Goals	Apps	Goals
Japan			League		Emperor's Cup		J. League Cup		Total	
2006	Mito HollyHock	J2 League	24	1	1	0	-		25	1
2007	Mito HollyHock	J2 League	42	7	2	0	-		44	7
2008	Mito HollyHock	J2 League	7	0	0	0	-		7	0
2009	Sagawa Printing	JFL	31	17	1	0	-		32	17
2010	Sagawa Printing	JFL	14	7	1	1	-		15	8
2011	Matsumoto Yamaga	JFL	22	3	2	0	-		24	3
2012	Matsumoto Yamaga	J2 League	35	11	0	0	-		35	11
2013	Matsumoto Yamaga	J2 League	42	10	2	1	-		44	11
2014	Matsumoto Yamaga	J2 League	17	2	0	0	-		17	2
2015	Matsumoto Yamaga	J1 League	9	0	1	0	4	1	14	1
Total			244	58	10	2	4	1	258	61
