= Jairo (footballer, born 1991) =

Brazilian footballer

Personal information
- Full name: Jairo Pereira Reis
- Date of birth: March 5, 1991 (age 35)
- Place of birth: Brazil
- Height: 1.93 m (6 ft 4 in)
- Position: Forward

Senior career*
Years	Team	Apps	(Gls)
2009–2010	Palmas		
2011	Metropolitano		
2011	Juventus		
2012	Tochigi SC		
- * Club domestic league appearances and goals

Jairo Pereira Reis (born March 5, 1991) is a Brazilian football player.
