= Lee Min-soo =

South Korean footballer

Lee Min-Soo
Personal information
- Full name: Lee Min-Soo
- Date of birth: January 11, 1992 (age 34)
- Place of birth: South Korea
- Height: 1.78 m (5 ft 10 in)
- Position: Midfielder

Team information
- Current team: FC Anyang
- Number: 14

Youth career
- 2011: Hannam University

Senior career*
Years	Team	Apps	(Gls)
2012	Shonan Bellmare	3	(0)
2013	Shimizu S-Pulse	4	(0)
2014	Tochigi SC	16	(1)
2015	FC Machida Zelvia	0	(0)
2016	Yongin City	18	(2)
2017	Daejeon Korail	16	(4)
2018	Gangwon FC	1	(0)
2020	Gangneung Citizen FC	15	(2)
2021-2023	Cheonan City FC	73	(4)
2024-	FC Anyang	10	(0)

International career
2009	South Korea U-17		
2011	South Korea U-20		
- * Club domestic league appearances and goals as of 5 January 2026

Lee Min-Soo (Korean: 이민수; born January 11, 1992) is a South Korean football player who plays for FC Anyang.

== Club statistics ==
Club performance			League		Cup		Total	
Season	Club	League	Apps	Goals	Apps	Goals	Apps	Goals
Japan			League		Emperor's Cup		Total	
2012	Shonan Bellmare	J2 League	3	0				
Country	Japan		3	0	0	0	3	0
Total			3	0	0	0	3	0
