= Mutsumi Tamabayashi =

Japanese footballer

Personal information
- Full name: Mutsumi Tamabayashi
- Date of birth: October 12, 1984 (age 42)
- Place of birth: Uwajima, Ehime, Japan
- Height: 1.78 m (5 ft 10 in)
- Position: Full-back

Team information
- Current team: Artista Asama
- Number: 14

Youth career
- 2000–2002: Minamiuwa Senior High School
- 2003–2006: Kibi International University

Senior career*
Years	Team	Apps	(Gls)
2007–2009	Fagiano Okayama	48	(1)
2010–2014	Matsumoto Yamaga	125	(7)
2015–2019	Ehime FC	109	(5)
2020–	Artista Asama		
- * Club domestic league appearances and goals as of 19:30, 13 May 2021 (UTC)

Mutsumi Tamabayashi (玉林 睦実, Tamabayashi Mutsumi; born October 12, 1984) is a Japanese football player for Artista Asama.

== Club statistics ==
Updated to end of 2018 season.

Club performance			League		Cup		Total	
Season	Club	League	Apps	Goals	Apps	Goals	Apps	Goals
Japan			League		Emperor's Cup		Total	
2008	Fagiano Okayama	JFL	27	1	3	1	30	2
2009	Fagiano Okayama	J2 League	21	0	1	0	22	0
2010	Matsumoto Yamaga	JFL	21	0	2	0	0	0
2011	Matsumoto Yamaga	JFL	12	1	2	0	0	0
2012	Matsumoto Yamaga	J2 League	38	2	1	0	0	0
2013	Matsumoto Yamaga	J2 League	42	4	1	0	0	0
2014	Matsumoto Yamaga	J2 League	12	0	2	0	0	0
2015	Ehime FC	J2 League	39	4	1	0	40	4
2016	Ehime FC	J2 League	22	0	3	0	25	0
2017	Ehime FC	J2 League	28	1	0	0	28	1
2018	Ehime FC	J2 League	17	0	1	0	18	0
Total			279	13	17	1	296	14
