= Hayato Michiue =

Japanese footballer

Hayato Michiue 道上 隼人
Personal information
- Full name: Hayato Michiue
- Date of birth: June 17, 1991 (age 35)
- Place of birth: Osaka, Japan
- Height: 1.69 m (5 ft 6 1/2 in)
- Position: Midfielder

Team information
- Current team: Veertien Mie
- Number: 24

Youth career
- 2007–2009: Cerezo Osaka U-18
- 2010–2013: Momoyama Gakuin University

Senior career*
Years	Team	Apps	(Gls)
2014–2016	Matsumoto Yamaga	2	(0)
2015–2016	→ Azul Claro Numazu (loan)	20	(0)
2017–	Veertien Mie	18	(0)
- * Club domestic league appearances and goals as of 20 February 2018

Hayato Michiue (道上 隼人, Michiue Hayato; born June 17, 1991) is a Japanese football player for Veertien Mie.

== Playing career ==
Hayato Michiue joined to Matsumoto Yamaga FC in 2014. In July 2015, he moved to Azul Claro Numazu.

== Career statistics ==
Updated to 20 February 2018.

Appearances and goals by club, season and competition
Club	Season	League			Emperor's Cup		Total	
Club	Season	Division	Apps	Goals	Apps	Goals	Apps	Goals
Matsumoto Yamaga	2014	J2 League	2	0	2	0	4	0
Matsumoto Yamaga	2015	J1 League	0	0	–		0	0
Azul Claro Numazu	2015	JFL	12	0	–		12	0
Azul Claro Numazu	2016	JFL	8	0	–		8	0
Veertien Mie	2017	JFL	18	0	–		18	0
Career total			40	0	2	0	42	0
