= Junto Matsushita =

Japanese footballer

Personal information
- Full name: Junto Matsushita
- Date of birth: 3 May 1991 (age 35)
- Place of birth: Tokyo, Japan
- Height: 1.80 m (5 ft 11 in)
- Position: Midfielder

Youth career
- 2007–2009: Kokugakuin Kugayama High School
- 2010–2013: Keio University Soccer Team

Senior career*
Years	Team	Apps	(Gls)
2014	Matsumoto Yamaga	0	(0)
2014–2016	→ Machida Zelvia (loaned and bought)	26	(0)
- * Club domestic league appearances and goals as of 28 August 2016

Junto Matsushita (松下純土, Matsushita Junto; born 3 May 1991 in Tokyo) is a retired Japanese footballer who played for Machida Zelvia.

== Career statistics ==
Updated to 28 August 2025.

Appearances and goals by club, season, and competition
Club	Season	League			Emperor's Cup		Total	
Club	Season	Division	Apps	Goals	Apps	Goals	Apps	Goals
Machida Zelvia	2014	J3 League	5	0	–		5	0
Machida Zelvia	2015	J3 League	13	0	3	0	16	0
Machida Zelvia	2016	J2 League	4		1	0	5	0
Career total			22	0	3	0	26	0
