= Kohei Kiyama =

Japanese footballer

Kohei Kiyama 喜山 康平
Personal information
- Full name: Kohei Kiyama
- Date of birth: 22 February 1988 (age 38)
- Place of birth: Tokyo, Japan
- Height: 1.79 m (5 ft 10 1/2 in)
- Position: Defensive midfielder

Team information
- Current team: Giravanz Kitakyushu
- Number: 11

Youth career
- Minamiyurigaoka SC
- –1998: Shinpukuji FC
- 1999–2005: Tokyo Verdy

Senior career*
Years	Team	Apps	(Gls)
2006–2007	Tokyo Verdy	1	(0)
2007–2011	Fagiano Okayama	117	(49)
2011	→ Tokyo Verdy (loan)	0	(0)
2011	→ Kamatamare Sanuki (loan)	16	(0)
2012–2016	Matsumoto Yamaga	184	(9)
2017–2023	Fagiano Okayama	249	(14)
2023–2024	Matsumoto Yamaga	15	(0)
2024–	Giravanz Kitakyushu	37	(1)
- * Club domestic league appearances and goals as of 1 January 2026

Kohei Kiyama (喜山 康平, Kiyama Kōhei; born 22 February 1988) is a Japanese football player. He plays for Giravanz Kitakyushu.

== Career statistics ==
Updated to 10 August 2022.

Appearances and goals by club, season and competition
Club	Season	League			Emperor's Cup		J.League Cup		Total	
Club	Season	Division	Apps	Goals	Apps	Goals	Apps	Goals	Apps	Goals
Tokyo Verdy	2006	J2 League	1	0	0	0	—		1	0
Tokyo Verdy	2007	J2 League	0	0	0	0	—		0	0
Fagiano Okayama	2007	JRL (Chūgoku)	17	27	—		—		17	27
Fagiano Okayama	2008	JFL	32	18	1	0	—		33	18
Fagiano Okayama	2009	J2 League	48	3	1	0	—		49	3
Fagiano Okayama	2010	J2 League	20	1	0	0	—		20	1
Tokyo Verdy	2011	J2 League	0	0	—		—		0	0
Kamatamare Sanuki	2011	JFL	16	0	1	0	—		17	0
Matsumoto Yamaga	2012	J2 League	39	0	1	0	—		40	0
Matsumoto Yamaga	2013	J2 League	34	3	2	0	—		36	3
Matsumoto Yamaga	2014	J2 League	38	4	1	0	—		39	4
Matsumoto Yamaga	2015	J1 League	33	2	3	0	2	0	38	2
Matsumoto Yamaga	2016	J2 League	40	0	0	0	—		40	0
Fagiano Okayama	2017	J2 League	41	2	0	0	—		41	2
Fagiano Okayama	2018	J2 League	40	1	0	0	—		40	1
Fagiano Okayama	2019	J2 League	33	0	1	0	–		34	0
Fagiano Okayama	2020	J2 League	4	0	–		–		4	0
Fagiano Okayama	2021	J2 League	34	2	1	0	–		36	2
Fagiano Okayama	2022	J2 League	20	0	0	0	–		20	0
Career total			490	63	11	0	2	0	503	63
