= Shusaku Tokita =

Japanese footballer

Personal information
- Full name: Shusaku Tokita
- Date of birth: September 9, 1990 (age 36)
- Place of birth: Chiba, Japan
- Height: 1.87 m (6 ft 1 1/2 in)
- Position: Defender

Team information
- Current team: Japan Soccer College

Youth career
- 2009–2012: Meikai University

Senior career*
Years	Team	Apps	(Gls)
2013	Matsumoto Yamaga FC	0	(0)
2013	Fukushima United FC	4	(0)
2014	Grulla Morioka	11	(1)
2015	Azul Claro Numazu	7	(0)
2016–	Japan Soccer College		
Total		22	(1)
- * Club domestic league appearances and goals as of December 31, 2015

Shusaku Tokita (鴇田 周作, Tokita Shūsaku; born September 9, 1990) is a Japanese football player. He plays for Japan Soccer College.

== Playing career ==
Shusaku Tokita played for Matsumoto Yamaga FC, Fukushima United FC, Grulla Morioka and Azul Claro Numazu from 2013 to 2015. He moved to Japan Soccer College in 2016.
