= Masato Katayama =

Japanese footballer

Personal information
- Date of birth: April 19, 1984 (age 42)
- Place of birth: Osaka, Japan
- Height: 1.83 m (6 ft 0 in)
- Position: Forward

Youth career
- 2000–2002: Gamba Osaka
- 2003–2006: Kindai University

Senior career*
Years	Team	Apps	(Gls)
2007	Matsumoto Yamaga FC	13	(14)
2008–2009	FC Gifu	47	(8)
2010	Mito HollyHock	29	(6)
2011–2012	Matsumoto Yamaga FC	28	(4)
Total		117	(32)
- * Club domestic league appearances and goals

Masato Katayama (片山 真人, Katayama Masato; born April 19, 1984) is a former Japanese football player.

== Club statistics ==
Club performance			League		Cup		Total	
Season	Club	League	Apps	Goals	Apps	Goals	Apps	Goals
Japan			League		Emperor's Cup		Total	
2007	Matsumoto Yamaga FC	Regional Leagues	13	14	-		13	14
2008	FC Gifu	J2 League	36	8	0	0	36	8
2009	FC Gifu	J2 League	11	0	1	0	12	0
2010	Mito HollyHock	J2 League	29	6	2	1	31	7
Total			89	28	3	1	92	29
