= Ken Hisatomi =

Japanese footballer (born 1990)

Ken Hisatomi 久富 賢

Personal information
- Full name: Ken Hisatomi
- Date of birth: September 29, 1990 (age 36)
- Place of birth: Hamatama, Saga, Japan
- Height: 1.64 m (5 ft 4 1/2 in)
- Position: Midfielder

Team information
- Current team: Vonds Ichihara

Youth career
- 2006–2008: Tokai University Daigo; Senior High School

Senior career*
Years	Team	Apps	(Gls)
2009–2011	Yokohama FC	8	(0)
2011–2013	Matsumoto Yamaga	3	(1)
2012	→ Fujieda MYFC (loan)	9	(1)
2013–2015	Fujieda MYFC	99	(10)
2016–2021	Blaublitz Akita	157	(25)
2022-	Vonds Ichihara		
- * Club domestic league appearances and goals as of 11 January 2022

Ken Hisatomi (久富 賢, born September 29, 1990) is a Japanese football player who plays as a midfielder for Vonds Ichihara.

== Career ==
On 5 December 2013, Hisatomi was selected as Fujieda MYFC's player of the 2013 season by a fan blog.

== Career statistics ==
Updated to 25 December 2021.

Appearances and goals by club, season and competition
Club	Season	League			Emperor's Cup		Total	
Club	Season	Division	Apps	Goals	Apps	Goals	Apps	Goals
Yokohama FC	2009	J2 League	6	0	0	0	6	0
Yokohama FC	2010	J2 League	2	0	0	0	2	0
Matsumoto Yamaga	2011	JFL	15	1	3	0	18	1
Matsumoto Yamaga	2012	J2 League	3	1	0	0	3	1
Fujieda MYFC	2012	JFL	9	1	0	0	9	1
Fujieda MYFC	2013	JFL	31	5	2	0	33	5
Fujieda MYFC	2014	J3 League	33	2	1	0	34	2
Fujieda MYFC	2015	J3 League	35	3	3	0	38	3
Blaublitz Akita	2016	J3 League	30	5	2	0	32	5
Blaublitz Akita	2017	J3 League	32	10	1	0	33	10
Blaublitz Akita	2018	J3 League	30	6	0	0	30	6
Blaublitz Akita	2019	J3 League	17	2	0	0	17	2
Blaublitz Akita	2020	J3 League	31	2	2	1	33	2
Blaublitz Akita	2021	J2 League	17	0	1	0	18	0
Career total			291	39	15	1	306	40

== Honours ==
Blaublitz Akita

- J3 League (2): 2017, 2020
