= Yoon Sung-yeul =

South Korean footballer

Personal information
- Date of birth: December 22, 1987 (age 38)
- Place of birth: South Korea
- Height: 1.81 m (5 ft 11 in)
- Positions: Midfielder; wing-back

Team information
- Current team: Seoul E-Land
- Number: 21

Youth career
- 2006–2009: Pai Chai University

Senior career*
Years	Team	Apps	(Gls)
2011	Machida Zelvia	14	(0)
2012–2014	Matsumoto Yamaga	55	(0)
2015–	Seoul E-Land	54	(1)
2016–2017	→ Cheongju City (loan)	15	(2)
2017–2018	→ Gimpo Citizen (loan)		
- * Club domestic league appearances and goals as of 1 February 2019

- Yoon Sung-yeul
- Hangul: 윤성열
- Hanja: 尹誠悅
- RR: Yun Seongyeol
- MR: Yun Sŏngyŏl

Yoon Sung-yeul (born December 22, 1987) is a South Korean football player who plays for Seoul E-Land.

== Club statistics ==
Club performance			League		Cup		Total	
Season	Club	League	Apps	Goals	Apps	Goals	Apps	Goals
Japan			League		Emperor's Cup		Total	
2011	Machida Zelvia	Football League	14	0	0	0	14	0
2012	Matsumoto Yamaga	J2 League	23	0			23	0
2013	Matsumoto Yamaga	J2 League	17	0	1	0	18	0
2014	Matsumoto Yamaga	J2 League	15	0	1	0	16	0
Country	Japan		69	0	2	0	71	0
Total			69	0	2	0	71	0
