= Choi Su-bin =

South Korean footballer

Personal information
- Full name: Choi Su-bin
- Date of birth: October 14, 1988 (age 38)
- Place of birth: South Korea
- Height: 1.84 m (6 ft 0 in)
- Position: Forward

Team information
- Current team: Mokpo City FC
- Number: 17

Youth career
- 2007–2010: Inje University

Senior career*
Years	Team	Apps	(Gls)
2011	Incheon United	0	(0)
2012	Matsumoto Yamaga FC	8	(1)
2013	Mokpo City	10	(3)
2014	Persenga Mganjuk	0	(0)
2015–	Mokpo City FC	0	(0)
- * Club domestic league appearances and goals

Choi Su-bin (born October 14, 1988) is a South Korean football player who currently plays for Mokpo City.

== Club statistics ==
Club performance			League		Cup		Total	
Season	Club	League	Apps	Goals	Apps	Goals	Apps	Goals
Japan			League		Emperor's Cup		Total	
2012	Matsumoto Yamaga FC	J2 League	8	1				
Country	Japan		8	1	0	0	8	1
Total			8	1	0	0	8	1
