= Paulinho (footballer, born January 1989) =

Brazilian footballer

Paulinho パウリーニョ
Personal information
- Full name: Paulo Roberto Gonzaga
- Date of birth: 26 January 1989 (age 37)
- Place of birth: Blumenau, Santa Catarina, Brazil
- Height: 1.77 m (5 ft 10 in)
- Position: Defensive midfielder

Youth career
- 2004–2005: Metropolitano
- 2005–2008: Grêmio

Senior career*
Years	Team	Apps	(Gls)
2008	Grêmio	10	(0)
2009–2010	Vasco da Gama	9	(0)
2010–2014	Tochigi SC	91	(4)
2014	→ Kawasaki Frontale (loan)	14	(0)
2015–2017	JEF United Chiba	36	(2)
2016	→ Shonan Bellmare (loan)	10	(2)
2016–2017	→ Matsumoto Yamaga (loan)	53	(7)
2018–2019	Matsumoto Yamaga	49	(4)
2020–2021	Fagiano Okayama	57	(1)
2022–2023	Matsumoto Yamaga	31	(5)
Total		364	(25)
- * Club domestic league appearances and goals

Paulo Roberto Gonzaga (パウリーニョ, born January 26, 1989), most commonly known as Paulinho, is a Brazilian former footballer who plays as a defensive midfielder.

== Career ==
On 12 January 2020, Paulinho officially joined the J2 club, Fagiano Okayama, ahead of 2020 season as permanent transfer. He left from the club in 2021 after two seasons at Okayama.

== Career statistics ==
=== Club ===
Appearances and goals by club, season and competition
Club	Season	League			State League		Cup		League Cup		Continental		Other		Total	
Club	Season	Division	Apps	Goals	Apps	Goals	Apps	Goals	Apps	Goals	Apps	Goals	Apps	Goals	Apps	Goals
Vasco da Gama	2009	Série B	3	0	1	0	0	0	—		—		—		4	0
Vasco da Gama	2010	Série A	1	0	4	0	3	0	—		—		—		8	0
Vasco da Gama	Total		4	0	5	0	3	0	—		—		—		12	0
Tochigi SC	2010	J. League Division 2	17	2	—		2	0	—		—		—		19	2
Tochigi SC	2011	J. League Division 2	22	1	—		0	0	—		—		—		22	1
Tochigi SC	2012	J. League Division 2	29	1	—		0	0	—		—		—		29	1
Tochigi SC	2013	J. League Division 2	23	0	—		1	0	—		—		—		24	0
Tochigi SC	Total		91	4	—		3	0	—		—		—		94	4
Kawasaki Frontale (loan)	2014	J. League Division 1	14	0	—		1	0	0	0	4	0	—		19	0
JEF United Chiba	2015	J. League Division 2	36	2	—		1	0	—		—		—		37	2
Shonan Bellmare (loan)	2016	J. League Division 1	10	2	—		—		2	0	—		—		12	2
Matsumoto Yamaga (loan)	2016	J2 League	19	3	—		2	0	—		—		1	1	22	4
Matsumoto Yamaga (loan)	2017	J2 League	34	4	—		2	0	—		—		—		36	4
Matsumoto Yamaga	2018	J2 League	21	3	—		1	0	—		—		—		22	3
Matsumoto Yamaga	2019	J1 League	28	1	—		0	0	—		—		—		22	3
Matsumoto Yamaga	Matsumoto total		102	11	—		5	0	—		—		1	1	108	12
Fagiano Okayama	2020	J2 League	27	1	—		–		—		—		—		27	1
Fagiano Okayama	2021	J2 League	30	3	—		2	0	—		—		—		32	3
Fagiano Okayama	Total		57	4	—		2	0	—		—		—		59	4
Matsumoto Yamaga	2022	J3 League	27	0	—		0	0	—		—		—		27	0
Matsumoto Yamaga	2023	J3 League	18	2	—		—		—		—		—		18	2
Matsumoto Yamaga	Total		45	2	—		0	0	—		—		—		45	2
Career total			359	25	5	0	12	0	2	0	4	0	1	1	383	26

== Honours ==
Matsumoto Yamaga

- J2 League: 2018
