= Akito Tachibana =

Japanese footballer

Personal information
- Full name: Akito Tachibana
- Date of birth: October 13, 1988 (age 38)
- Place of birth: Hyogo, Japan
- Height: 1.73 m (5 ft 8 in)
- Position: Midfielder

Youth career
- 2007–2010: Osaka Sangyo University

Senior career*
Years	Team	Apps	(Gls)
2011–2013	Shimizu S-Pulse	0	(0)
2012	→Matsumoto Yamaga FC (loan)	1	(0)
Total		1	(0)
Medal record
Shimizu S-Pulse
Runner-up	J.League Cup	2012
- * Club domestic league appearances and goals

Akito Tachibana (橘 章斗, Tachibana Akito; born October 13, 1988) is a former Japanese football player.

== Club statistics ==
Club performance			League		Cup		League Cup		Total	
Season	Club	League	Apps	Goals	Apps	Goals	Apps	Goals	Apps	Goals
Japan			League		Emperor's Cup		J.League Cup		Total	
2011	Shimizu S-Pulse	J1 League	0	0	0	0	0	0	0	0
2012	Shimizu S-Pulse	J1 League	0	0	0	0	1	0	1	0
2012	Matsumoto Yamaga FC	J2 League								
Country	Japan		0	0	0	0	1	0	1	0
Total			0	0	0	0	1	0	1	0
