= Kansai University of International Studies =

Private university in Miki, Hyōgo, Japan

Coordinates: 34.771802°N 135.043768°E

- 関西国際大学
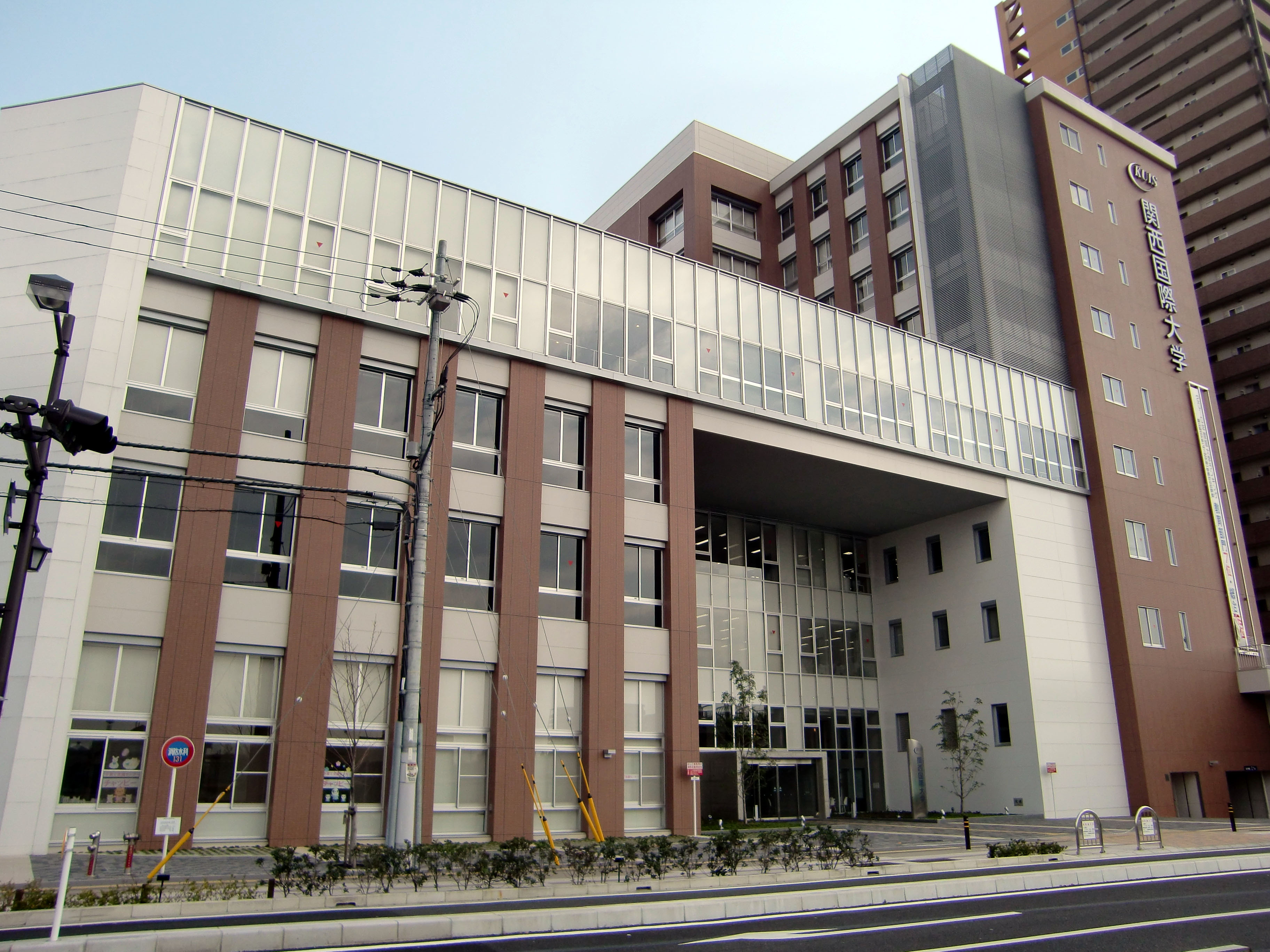
- Type: Private
- Established: 1987
- Location: Miki, Hyōgo, Japan

Kansai University of International Studies (関西国際大学, Kansai kokusai daigaku)(KUISs) is a private university in Miki, Hyōgo, Japan. The school was first established as a junior women's college in 1987. In 1998 it became a co-ed four-year college. It opened a campus in Amagasaki city between Kobe and Osaka in 2009.
