= Thiago Silva (footballer, born 1983) =

Brazilian footballer

Personal information
- Full name: Thiago Araujo da Silva
- Date of birth: 22 June 1983 (age 43)
- Place of birth: São Bernardo do Campo, Brazil
- Height: 1.75 m (5 ft 9 in)
- Position: Midfielder

Team information
- Current team: Comercial

Senior career*
Years	Team	Apps	(Gls)
1999–2003	Palmeiras		
2004	J.Malucelli		
2005	3 de Febrero		
2006	Palmeiras		
2007	America Mineiro		
2008	Atletico Mineiro		
2008	America Mineiro		
2009	Bragantino	2	(0)
2009	Paysandu	2	(0)
2010	3 de Febrero	16	(2)
2011	Paulista		
2011	Anápolis		
2012	Central	19	(5)
2012	Matsumoto Yamaga FC	0	(0)
2013–	Comercial	13	(0)
- * Club domestic league appearances and goals

Thiago Araujo da Silva (born 22 June 1983) is a Brazilian professional footballer who plays as a midfielder for Comercial Futebol Clube (Ribeirão Preto).

== Career ==
=== Early career ===
Thiago Silva was initially at Palmeiras, moving to J.Malucelli after four years at the club. He would then move between several clubs over the next four years, moving to 3 de Febrero, back to Palmeiras, to America Mineiro, to Atletico Mineiro,, and then back to America Mineiro once more.

=== Debut season ===
In 2009, Silva moved first to Campeonato Brasileiro Série C side Clube Atlético Bragantino, then to Paulista Série A1 side Paysandu Sport Club, where he would make two league appearances for both clubs.

=== Return to Paraguay ===
For 2010, Thiago Silva returned to 3 de Febrero, now playing in the Paraguayan Primera División, where he made 16 appearances, scoring 2 goals.

=== Return to Brazil ===
For 2011, he joined Paulista A1 side Paulista FC, playing three times. He would then move to Anápolis Futebol Clube briefly, before moving to Pernambucano Série A1 side Central Sport Club, where he made 19 appearances, scoring 5 goals.

=== Japan ===
On 10 August 2012, Thiago Silva signed for J2 League side Matsumoto Yamaga FC, being given the number 10 shirt, previously worn by Michiaki Kakimoto. He left the club in 2013 after the club decided not to renew his contract, having not played a game all season.

=== Comercial ===
Having left Matsumoto, Thiago Silva signed for Campeonato Paulista Série A2 side Comercial. He made his debut on 23 January 2013, playing in a 1–1 draw against Rio Claro.
