= Kento Tsurumaki =

Japanese footballer

Personal information
- Date of birth: June 29, 1987 (age 39)
- Place of birth: Niigata, Japan
- Height: 1.73 m (5 ft 8 in)
- Position: Midfielder

Youth career
- 2003–2005: Tokyo Verdy

Senior career*
| Years | Team | Apps | (Gls) |
| 2005–2010 | Tokyo Verdy | 7 | (0) |
| 2007 | → Fagiano Okayama (loan) | 15 | (5) |
| 2008 | → Mito HollyHock (loan) | 1 | (0) |
| 2010–2013 | Matsumoto Yamaga FC | 72 | (10) |
| 2014 | Ayutthaya | | |
| Total | | 95 | (15) |
- * Club domestic league appearances and goals

Kento Tsurumaki (弦巻 健人, Tsurumaki Kento; born June 29, 1987) is a former Japanese football player. He married Nami Otake, a former professional footballer on the Japan women's national football team, on 29 June 2012.
