= Yuta Murase =

Japanese footballer

Personal information
- Date of birth: 28 October 1989 (age 37)
- Place of birth: Chiba, Japan
- Height: 1.75 m (5 ft 9 in)
- Position: Midfielder

Team information
- Current team: FC Maruyasu Okazaki
- Number: 14

Youth career
- Kashiwa Eagles
- –2008: Ryutsu Keizai University Kashiwa HS
- 2008–2011: Ryutsu Keizai University

Senior career*
Years	Team	Apps	(Gls)
2009–2010	RKU	35	(4)
2012–2013	Matsumoto Yamaga	0	(0)
2013	→ Fujieda MYFC (loan)	21	(2)
2014–2017	ReinMeer Aomori	90	(14)
2018–2019	Nara Club	37	(1)
2020–2021	Vanraure Hachinohe	7	(0)
2021-	FC Maruyasu Okazaki	53	(1)
Total		243	(22)
- * Club domestic league appearances and goals as of 24/1/24 @ 12:53(AEST)

Yuta Murase (村瀬 勇太, Murase Yuta; born 28 October 1989) is a Japanese footballer currently playing as a midfielder for Vanraure Hachinohe.

== Career statistics ==
=== Club ===
As of 10 November 2020.

Club	Season	League			National Cup		League Cup		Other		Total	
Club	Season	Division	Apps	Goals	Apps	Goals	Apps	Goals	Apps	Goals	Apps	Goals
RKU	2008	JFL	10	1	0	0	–		0	0	10	1
RKU	2009	JFL	21	2	1 (Note: Appearance(s) in Emperor's Cup)	0	–		0	0	22	2
RKU	2010	JFL	4	1	1	0	–		0	0	5	1
RKU	Total		35	4	2	0	0	0	0	0	9	1
Matsumoto Yamaga	2012	J2 League	0	0	0	0	0	0	0	0	0	0
Matsumoto Yamaga	2013	J2 League	0	0	0	0	0	0	0	0	0	0
Matsumoto Yamaga	Total		0	0	0	0	0	0	0	0	0	0
Fujieda MYFC (loan)	2013	JFL	21	2	1	0	–		0	0	22	2
ReinMeer Aomori	2014	Tohoku Soccer League	16	2	0	0	–		0	0	16	2
ReinMeer Aomori	2015	Tohoku Soccer League	16	4	1	0	–		5 (Note: Appearance(s) in Japanese Regional Football League Competition)	0	22	4
ReinMeer Aomori	2010	JFL	28	4	0	0	–		0	0	28	4
ReinMeer Aomori	2010	JFL	30	4	0	0	–		0	0	30	4
ReinMeer Aomori	Total		90	14	1	0	0	0	5	0	96	14
Nara Club	2008	JFL	21	1	2	0	–		0	0	23	2
Nara Club	2009	JFL	16	0	1	0	–		0	0	17	0
Nara Club	Total		37	1	3	0	0	0	0	0	40	1
Vanraure Hachinohe	2020	J3 League	6	0	0	0	–		0	0	6	0
Career total			189	21	7	0	0	0	5	0	201	21
