= Yuji Fujikawa =

Japanese footballer

Personal information
- Full name: Yuji Fujikawa
- Date of birth: June 8, 1987 (age 39)
- Place of birth: Kanagawa, Japan
- Height: 1.77 m (5 ft 9 1/2 in)
- Position: Defender

Youth career
- 1997–2005: Yokohama F. Marinos

College career
Years	Team	Apps	(Gls)
2006–2009	Kanagawa University		

Senior career*
Years	Team	Apps	(Gls)
2010	Mito HollyHock	24	(0)
2011–2012	Oita Trinita	15	(0)
2012	Matsumoto Yamaga FC	7	(1)
2013–2015	YSCC Yokohama	25	(0)
Total		71	(1)
- * Club domestic league appearances and goals

Yuji Fujikawa (藤川 祐司, Fujikawa Yūji; born June 8, 1987) is a former Japanese football player.

== Club statistics ==
Club performance			League		Cup		League Cup		Total	
Season	Club	League	Apps	Goals	Apps	Goals	Apps	Goals	Apps	Goals
Japan			League		Emperor's Cup		League Cup		Total	
2010	Mito HollyHock	J2 League	24	0	0	0	-		24	0
2011	Oita Trinita	J2 League					-			
Career total			24	0	0	0	0	0	24	0
