= Yuya Miura =

Japanese footballer

Personal information
- Full name: Yuya Miura
- Date of birth: 2 April 1989 (age 37)
- Place of birth: Tōkai, Aichi, Japan
- Height: 1.83 m (6 ft 0 in)
- Position: Goalkeeper

Youth career
- 2008–2011: University of Tsukuba

Senior career*
Years	Team	Apps	(Gls)
2012	Kashiwa Reysol	0	(0)
2012	→ Matsumoto Yamaga FC (loan)	0	(0)
2013–2014	Shimizu S-Pulse	0	(0)
2015–2017	V-Varen Nagasaki	1	(0)
Medal record
Kashiwa Reysol
Winner	Emperor's Cup	2012
- * Club domestic league appearances and goals as of 2 February 2018

Yuya Miura (三浦 雄也, Miura Yuya; born 2 April 1989) is a Japanese former footballer.

== Career statistics ==
Updated to 2 February 2018.

Appearances and goals by club, season and competition
Club	Season	League			Emperor's Cup		J.League Cup		Total	
Club	Season	Division	Apps	Goals	Apps	Goals	Apps	Goals	Apps	Goals
Kashiwa Reysol	2012	J1 League	0	0	–		0	0	0	0
Matsumoto Yamaga	2012	J2 League	0	0	0	0	–		0	0
Shimizu S-Pulse	2013	J1 League	0	0	0	0	0	0	0	0
Shimizu S-Pulse	2014	J1 League	0	0	0	0	0	0	0	0
V-Varen Nagasaki	2015	J2 League	0	0	1	0	–		1	0
V-Varen Nagasaki	2016	J2 League	1	0	1	0	–		2	0
V-Varen Nagasaki	2017	J2 League	0	0	1	0	–		1	0
Career total			1	0	3	0	0	0	4	0
