= Takayuki Funayama =

Japanese footballer (born 1987)

Takayuki Funayama 船山 貴之
Personal information
- Full name: Takayuki Funayama
- Date of birth: 6 May 1987 (age 39)
- Place of birth: Narita, Chiba, Japan
- Height: 1.74 m (5 ft 8 1/2 in)
- Position: Striker

Team information
- Current team: ReinMeer Aomori
- Number: 10

Youth career
- 2003–2005: Kashiwa Reysol

Senior career*
Years	Team	Apps	(Gls)
2006–2009	Ryutsu Keizai University	60	(20)
2010–2011	Tochigi SC	15	(0)
2011–2014	Matsumoto Yamaga	140	(47)
2015	Kawasaki Frontale	21	(0)
2016–2021	JEF United Chiba	158	(50)
2022	SC Sagamihara	33	(4)
2023–	ReinMeer Aomori	0	(0)
- * Club domestic league appearances and goals as of 29 January 2023, 9:20 (UTC)

Takayuki Funayama (船山 貴之, Funayama Takayuki; born May 6, 1987 in Narita, Chiba) is a Japanese football player. He currently plays for ReinMeer Aomori.

== Career ==
On 23 December 2015, Funayama transferred to J2 club, JEF United Chiba for 2016 season. On 4 December 2021, he announced the expiration of his contract with Chiba, although he was regretted by many supporters.

On 30 December 2021, Funayama joined to J3 relegated club, SC Sagamihara for 2022 season. On 28 November 2022, he left from the club in 2022 after sagamihara expiration contract.

On 27 January 2023, Funayama announcement officially transfer to JFL club, ReinMeer Aomori for ahead of 2023 season.

== Personal life ==
His elder brother Yuji is also a Japanese footballer until he retirement in 2016.

== Career statistics ==
=== Club ===
Updated to the start of 2023 season.

Club	Season	League		Emperor's Cup		J. League Cup		Total	
Club	Season	Apps	Goals	Apps	Goals	Apps	Goals	Apps	Goals
Ryutsu Keizai University	2006	19	8	0	0	–		19	8
Ryutsu Keizai University	2007	13	4	0	0	–		13	4
Ryutsu Keizai University	2008	16	7	1	1	–		17	8
Ryutsu Keizai University	2009	12	1	1	1	–		13	2
Tochigi SC	2010	12	0	1	1	–		13	1
Tochigi SC	2011	3	0	–				3	0
Matsumoto Yamaga	2011	17	5	3	1	–		20	6
Matsumoto Yamaga	2012	40	12	0	0	–		40	12
Matsumoto Yamaga	2013	41	11	1	0	–		42	11
Matsumoto Yamaga	2014	42	19	1	0	–		43	19
Kawasaki Frontale	2015	21	0	1	0	6	0	28	0
JEF United Chiba	2016	42	5	3	1	–		45	6
JEF United Chiba	2017	38	7	1	0	–		39	7
JEF United Chiba	2018	39	19	0	0	–		39	19
JEF United Chiba	2019	35	12	1	0	–		36	12
JEF United Chiba	2020	35	3	–				35	3
JEF United Chiba	2021	38	8	1	0	–		39	8
SC Sagamihara	2022	33	4	–				33	4
ReinMeer Aomori	2023	0	0	0	0	–		0	0
Career total		496	125	16	5	6	0	518	130
