= Masaki Yoshida =

Japanese footballer

Personal information
- Date of birth: April 10, 1984 (age 42)
- Place of birth: Niigata, Niigata, Japan
- Height: 1.71 m (5 ft 7 1/2 in)
- Position: Defender

Youth career
- 2004–2007: Hosei University

Senior career*
Years	Team	Apps	(Gls)
2003	Niigata Napoli		
2008–2009	Yokohama FC	56	(0)
2010–2011	Tokyo Verdy	22	(0)
2012	Matsumoto Yamaga FC	0	(0)
2012–2013	FC Ryukyu	37	(0)
Total		115	(0)
- * Club domestic league appearances and goals

Masaki Yoshida (吉田 正樹, Yoshida Masaki; born April 10, 1984) is a former Japanese football player.

== Club statistics ==
Club performance			League		Cup		Total	
Season	Club	League	Apps	Goals	Apps	Goals	Apps	Goals
Japan			League		Emperor's Cup		Total	
2008	Yokohama FC	J2 League	14	0	1	0	15	0
2009	Yokohama FC	J2 League	42	0	2	0	44	0
2010	Tokyo Verdy	J2 League	19	0	1	0	20	0
2011	Tokyo Verdy	J2 League						
Country	Japan		75	0	4	0	79	0
Total			75	0	4	0	79	0
