= Allisson Ricardo =

Brazilian footballer (born 1988)

Personal information
- Full name: Allisson Ricardo Faramílio
- Date of birth: January 30, 1988 (age 38)
- Place of birth: Itu, Brazil
- Height: 1.89 m (6 ft 2 in)
- Position: Striker

Team information
- Current team: FC Golden State Force

Youth career
- 2006–2007: Corinthians

Senior career*
Years	Team	Apps	(Gls)
2007–2009	Corinthians	0	(0)
2008–2010	→ Gama (loan)	?	(3)
2009	→ Juventude (loan)	6	(1)
2009	→ América de Natal (loan)	4	(0)
2010	União Barbarense	14	(10)
2010–2011	Oeste	2	(0)
2011	→ Red Bull Brasil (loan)	7	(2)
2012–2013	Audax São Paulo	4	(0)
2012	→ Matsumoto Yamaga FC (loan)	6	(1)
2013	→ Audax Rio (loan)	11	(2)
2014	Esporte Clube São Bento	15	(3)
2014	Ulsan Hyundai Mipo Dolphin	6	(2)
2015	FK Kukësi	3	(0)
2016	Zakho FC		
2018–	FC Golden State Force		
- * Club domestic league appearances and goals

Allisson Ricardo Faramílio (born January 30, 1988) is a Brazilian striker who currently plays for FC Golden State Force in the Premier Development League.
