= 2012 J.League Division 2 =

J.League Division 2
- Season: 2012
- Champions: Ventforet Kofu; 1st J2 title 1st D2 title
- Promoted: Ventforet Kofu; Shonan Bellmare; Oita Trinita
- Relegated: Machida Zelvia
- Matches: 462
- Goals: 1,073 (2.32 per match)
- Top goalscorer: Davi (29 goals)
- Highest attendance: 23,617; Trinita vs Ventforet
- Lowest attendance: 1,333; Thespa vs Roasso
- Average attendance: 5,805

The 2012 J.League Division 2 season was the 41st season of the second-tier club football in Japan and the 14th season since the establishment of J2 League. The season started on March 4 and finished on November 11, followed by the promotion playoffs among the 3rd to 6th placed clubs (see the article).

Ventforet Kofu became champions and returned to J1 immediately after one season at J2. Shonan Bellmare finished second and also won the automatic promotion along with Kofu, returning to the J1 after two years of absence. Oita Trinita finished sixth, but won the promotion playoffs by defeating 3rd-placed Kyoto Sanga at the semifinal and 5th-placed JEF United Chiba at the final thus returning to the J1 after three years of absence.

For the first time ever, relegation to the third-tier JFL was implemented, and Machida Zelvia became the unlucky first team to suffer that fate by finishing in bottom place only one season after entering the professional divisions.

== Clubs ==
Locations of the 2012 J.League 2 teams

The expected participant clubs are as follows:

Club name	Home town(s)	Note(s)
Avispa Fukuoka	Fukuoka	Relegated from J1 League in 2011
Shonan Bellmare	Southcentral cities/town in Kanagawa	
Ehime FC	All cities/towns in Ehime	
Fagiano Okayama	All cities/towns in Okayama	
Gainare Tottori	All cities/towns in Tottori	
FC Gifu	All cities/towns in Gifu	
Giravanz Kitakyushu	Kitakyushu, Fukuoka	
Mito HollyHock	Mito, Ibaraki	
JEF United Chiba	Chiba & Ichihara, Chiba	
Kataller Toyama	All cities/towns in Toyama	
Montedio Yamagata	All cities/towns in Yamagata	Relegated from J1 League in 2011
Roasso Kumamoto	Kumamoto	
Kyoto Sanga	Southwestern cities/towns in Kyoto	
Thespa Kusatsu	All cities/towns in Gunma	
Tochigi SC	Utsunomiya, Tochigi	
Oita Trinita	All cities/towns in Ōita	
Ventforet Kofu	All cities/towns in Yamanashi	Relegated from J1 League in 2011
Tokyo Verdy	All cities/towns in Tokyo	
Tokushima Vortis	All cities/towns in Tokushima	
Matsumoto Yamaga	Matsumoto, Nagano	Promoted from JFL in 2011
Yokohama FC	Yokohama, Kanagawa	
Machida Zelvia	Machida, Tokyo	Promoted from JFL in 2011

== Foreign players ==
Club	Player 1	Player 2	Player 3	AFC player	Type-C contract	Non-visa foreign	Former players
Avispa Fukuoka	(Brazil) Osmar	(Brazil) Samir		(South Korea) Kim Min-je	(South Korea) Oh Chang-hyun	(North Korea) Son Jeong-ryun	
Shonan Bellmare	(Brazil) Alex Martins	(Brazil) Thiago Quirino		(South Korea) Han Kook-young	(South Korea) Lee Min-soo	(South Korea) Kim Yeong-gi	(Brazil) Fabinho Cambalhota (Brazil) Raphael Macena
Ehime FC	(Brazil) Alair	(Croatia) Ante Tomić					
Fagiano Okayama	(Brazil) Anderson Gonzaga	(Brazil) Tiago		(South Korea) Kim Min-kyun		(South Korea) Go Daimu	
Gainare Tottori	(Costa Rica) Kenny Cunningham	(Costa Rica) Roy Smith		(South Korea) Kim Sun-min			
FC Gifu	(Brazil) Abuda	(Brazil) Danilo		(South Korea) Kim Jung-hyun		(North Korea) Ri Han-jae	(Brazil) Bruno (South Korea) Kim Dong-gwon
Giravanz Kitakyushu				(South Korea) Jim Jong-pil		(Brazil) Leonardo Moreira	
Mito HollyHock	(South Korea) Hwang Ju-yun			(South Korea) Kim Yong-gi			
JEF United Chiba	(Brazil) Ricardo Lobo	(Norway) Tor Hogne Aarøy					(Australia) Mark Milligan (Brazil) Reginaldo
Kataller Toyama				(South Korea) Seo Yong-duk			
Machida Zelvia	(Scotland) Colin Marshall	(Serbia) Dragan Dimić		(South Korea) Lee Woo-jin			
Montedio Yamagata	(Brazil) Branquinho						
Roasso Kumamoto	(Brazil) Fábio Pena			(South Korea) Choi Kun-sik			
Kyoto Sanga	(Burkina Faso) Wilfried Sanou	(Serbia) Miloš Bajalica		(South Korea) Jung Woo-young		(South Korea) Hwang Te-song	
Thespa Kusatsu	(Brazil) Alex Rafael					(North Korea) Kim Song-yong	(Brazil) Heberty (Brazil) Lincoln
Tochigi SC	(Brazil) Paulinho	(Brazil) Sabia		(South Korea) Cha Young-hwan	(South Korea) Yoo Dae-hyun	(Brazil) Jairo Balotelli	
Oita Trinita	(South Korea) Choi Jung-han	(South Korea) Kim Chang-hun	(South Korea) Lee Dong-myung		(South Korea) Kim Jung-hyun		
Ventforet Kofu	(Brazil) Davi	(Brazil) Douglas	(Brazil) Fernandinho	(South Korea) Choi Sung-keun	(Brazil) Renato Sá		(Brazil) Gabriel Pimba
Tokyo Verdy	(Brazil) Alex Henrique	(Brazil) Jymmy		(South Korea) Bae Dae-won	(Brazil) Nicollas		(Brazil) Josimar
Tokushima Vortis	(Brazil) Alex	(Brazil) Diogo Oliveira	(Brazil) Douglas	(South Korea) Oh Seung-hoon	(South Korea) Kim Jong-min		(Brazil) Elizeu
Matsumoto Yamaga	(Brazil) Allisson Ricardo	(Brazil) Thiago Silva	(South Korea) Choi Yong-woo	(South Korea) Yoon Sung-yeul			(Brazil) Eydison (South Korea) Lee Jong-min
Yokohama FC	(Brazil) Igor Castro	(Brazil) Kaio	(South Korea) Bae Seung-jin	(South Korea) Park Tae-hong	(South Korea) Na Sung-soo		(Brazil) Roberto

== Promotions and relegations ==
=== Promotions to Division 1 ===
Rather than 3 spots for automatic promotions to J.League Division 1 (J1) until the previous season, there are only 2 spots for automatic promotions from this season, and the 3rd promoting club will be determined by a play-off called Play-off for Promotion to J1 (J1昇格プレーオフ) held by 4 clubs (3rd – 6th placed clubs in the standings in the league matches). The regulation is:

First round
Two fixtures will be held, the "3rd placed club versus the 6th placed club" and the "4th placed club versus the 5th placed club". Each tie will be played as one-off match at the home stadium, which was determined by the standings in the league matches (i.e., 3rd and 4th placed clubs' stadiums).
Final round
The fixture will be held between the two winners of the first-round fixtures. The tie will be played as one-off match at a neutral venue, which was determined to be the Tokyo National Stadium on 23 July.
Tiebreakers
If the score is tied after 90 minutes, neither extra time nor penalty shoot-out will be held, the winner is determined by the standings in the league matches.
Exceptional Cases
In case one or more clubs of 3rd–6th places cannot meet promotion criteria, remaining clubs will participate in the play-off: the spots cannot be replaced by 7th-placed or lower clubs' case only three of the four clubs meet the promotion criteria, the highest ranked club among them will receive a bye to the final round.
- In case only two of the four clubs meet the promotion criteria, only the final round will be held.
- In case only one of the four clubs meets the promotion criteria, it will automatically promote.
- In case none of the four clubs meets the promotion criteria, the number of promoting club will be decreased.

On 28 September, it was announced that the following clubs did not meet the criteria, mainly in regard to the stadium's size, which are required to J1 clubs to maintain, thus will not be promoted to J1, or participating promotion playoffs even if finishing in the appropriate standing at the end of the regular season:

- Mito HollyHock
- Thespa Kusatsu
- Machida Zelvia
- FC Gifu
- Gainare Tottori
- Ehime FC
- Giravanz Kitakyushu
- Oita Trinita was granted a J1 license allowing promotion, but this will be revoked if the club cannot pay back ¥300 million debt to the JFA by 12 October.

=== Relegations to JFL ===
In 2008, J.League and Japan Football Association planned that at most 3 clubs in J2 are to relegate to Japan Football League (JFL) every season after the number of J2 clubs reached 22.

In January 2012, since the number of J2 clubs reached 22 from this season, J.League determined the regulation of the relegations from J2 to JFL that at most 2 clubs in J2 will relegate to JFL every season. The regulation is:

- 1st placed JFL club will replace a J2 club if it meets promotion criteria.
- 2nd placed JFL club will replace a J2 club if it meets promotion criteria and wins a home-and-away play-off against the J2 club.
- 3rd placed or lower JFL clubs cannot promote to J2 even if 1st or 2nd placed JFL clubs do not meet promotion criteria: the number of relegating clubs from J2 will be decreased.
  - Thus, in the play-off, the second last (i.e. 21st placed) J2 club will meet the 2nd placed JFL club if 1st placed JFL club promotes to J2; otherwise the last (i.e. 22nd placed) J2 club will meet.

== League table ==
Pos	Team	Pld	W	D	L	GF	GA	GD	Pts	Promotion or relegation
1	Ventforet Kofu (C, P)	42	24	14	4	63	35	+28	86	Promotion to 2013 J.League Division 1
2	Shonan Bellmare (P)	42	20	15	7	66	43	+23	75	Promotion to 2013 J.League Division 1
3	Kyoto Sanga	42	23	5	14	61	45	+16	74	Qualification for promotion playoffs
4	Yokohama FC	42	22	7	13	62	45	+17	73	Qualification for promotion playoffs
5	JEF United Chiba	42	21	9	12	61	33	+28	72	Qualification for promotion playoffs
6	Oita Trinita (O, P)	42	21	8	13	59	40	+19	71	Qualification for promotion playoffs
7	Tokyo Verdy	42	20	6	16	65	46	+19	66	
8	Fagiano Okayama	42	17	14	11	41	34	+7	65	
9	Giravanz Kitakyushu	42	19	7	16	53	47	+6	64	
10	Montedio Yamagata	42	16	13	13	51	49	+2	61	
11	Tochigi SC	42	17	9	16	50	49	+1	60	
12	Matsumoto Yamaga	42	15	14	13	46	43	+3	59	
13	Mito HollyHock	42	15	11	16	47	49	−2	56	
14	Roasso Kumamoto	42	15	10	17	40	48	−8	55	
15	Tokushima Vortis	42	13	12	17	45	49	−4	51	
16	Ehime FC	42	12	14	16	47	46	+1	50	
17	Thespa Kusatsu	42	12	11	19	31	45	−14	47	
18	Avispa Fukuoka	42	9	14	19	53	68	−15	41	
19	Kataller Toyama	42	9	11	22	38	59	−21	38	
20	Gainare Tottori	42	11	5	26	33	78	−45	38	
21	FC Gifu	42	7	14	21	27	55	−28	35	
22	Machida Zelvia (R)	42	7	11	24	34	67	−33	32	Relegation to 2013 Japan Football League (Note: The promotion and relegation between J2 and JFL will take place only if more than one promotion-eligible (i.e. having a J.League Associate Membership) JFL team finished above second place and playoff will be played only if a eligible JFL team finished in second place (See the corresponding section for further details). As only 2012 Japan Football League Champion V-Varen Nagasaki has the Associate Membership among the top 2 teams. Machida Zelvia was relegated immediately but no relegation/playoff was taken place for FC Gifu which finished 21st.)

Updated to match(es) played on 11 November 2012. Source: J.League Division 2
Rules for classification: 1st points; 2nd goal differential; 3rd goals scored; 4th head-to-head results; 5th disciplinary points; 6th draw. If two clubs are tied for first place, both clubs will be declared champions.
(C) Champions; (O) Play-off winners; (P) Promoted; (R) Relegated

== Results ==
Home \ Away	AVI	BEL	EHI	FAG	GAI	GIF	GIR	HOL	JEF	KAT	MON	ROS	SAN	SPA	TOC	TRI	VEN	VER	VOR	YAM	YFC	ZEL
Avispa Fukuoka		1–3	1–0	1–1	4–0	0–0	1–0	1–1	0–0	3–2	1–1	2–1	0–2	0–3	1–1	1–1	2–3	1–3	1–3	2–2	1–1	1–1
Shonan Bellmare	3–1		0–0	2–0	1–0	2–1	1–0	1–2	1–1	1–0	0–0	1–2 (Note: 3 matches for the 36th round, Kyoto at Tokushima, Kumamoto at Shonan, and Gifu at Matsumoto, originally scheduled on 30 September, were postponed due to approaching Typhoon Jelawat, to 1 October for Kumamoto at Shonan, 18 October for Gifu at Matsumoto and 25 October for Kyoto at Tokushima.)	2–1	2–0	2–1	1–1	1–1	1–1	0–0	1–0	3–2	2–0
Ehime FC	4–2	2–1		1–0	0–0	0–0	2–2	1–1	2–2	0–1	1–2	0–0	2–1	3–1	1–1	1–2	0–0	3–1	1–2	3–0	0–1	2–0
Fagiano Okayama	2–1	3–1	1–1		2–0	0–1	1–1	0–3	0–1	1–1	2–1	2–0	1–2	2–1	2–1	0–0	1–1	2–0	0–0	1–0	0–1	2–1
Gainare Tottori	2–1	1–2	1–4	0–2		1–0	1–2	2–1	2–1	1–0	2–1	0–1	2–1	2–0	0–2	1–0	0–0	0–2	0–3	0–1	2–5	0–3
FC Gifu	0–3	3–2	1–1	1–2	2–2		1–0	0–1	0–0	2–2	0–0	0–2	0–1	0–0	1–0	0–2	0–3	1–0	0–0	0–1	0–2	1–0
Giravanz Kitakyushu	4–2	3–2	2–0	0–0	1–0	2–1		1–0	1–2	1–0	0–1	2–0	2–0	0–1	1–1	0–2	2–3	1–5	1–2	0–1	1–2	1–1
Mito HollyHock	4–2	1–1	0–2	0–0	2–0	1–1	3–1		0–1	1–0	2–2	2–0	3–1	1–0	3–1	2–1	1–3	0–2	2–1	0–0	2–1	1–1
JEF United Chiba	2–1	1–1	1–0	0–0	3–1	0–1	0–3	3–0		1–1	2–0	4–0	3–2	2–0	0–0	1–2	0–1	2–2	3–0	2–0	3–0	0–1
Kataller Toyama	0–1	0–2	1–0	1–1	2–1	1–0	2–3	3–1	2–0		1–1	0–2	1–1	1–2	1–2	2–3	1–1	1–4	0–1	1–2	0–0	1–1
Montedio Yamagata	3–1	1–2	2–2	0–2	5–1	2–1	1–0	0–0	0–2	1–0		0–2	1–2	1–0	2–1	3–2	2–1	1–1	1–0	1–1	0–1	3–1
Roasso Kumamoto	3–1	3–3	0–1	0–0	2–1	3–0	2–2	2–1	1–0	3–0	2–1		0–1	1–1	3–0	2–1	0–0	0–2	0–3	0–3	0–1	2–1
Kyoto Sanga	3–2	1–2	2–1	1–1	3–1	3–1	1–0	4–1	2–0	0–1	2–2	2–0		0–1	1–0	1–2	0–0	1–0	2–1	0–1	2–1	2–1
Thespa Kusatsu	1–0	1–3	1–0	1–0	1–2	1–1	0–2	0–0	0–2	0–1	3–1	0–0	1–0		1–2	0–2	1–2	0–1	0–0	0–0	1–1	1–1
Tochigi SC	2–0 (Note: The 13th round game on 6 May between Tochigi S.C. and Avispa Fukuoka was abandoned at 69th minute because of heavy thunderstorm. The score at the moment was 1–0 for Tochigi (Cha Young-Hwan 48'). The remaining 24 minutes were played on 17 May resulting in another goal for Tochigi (Hirose 73') to secure 2–0 victory.)	1–1	1–0	0–1	0–1	1–1	1–2	1–0	2–1	0–0	1–0	2–0	1–2	0–0		0–3	1–2	3–2	1–1	3–2	3–4	1–0
Oita Trinita	1–0	1–4	1–0	1–0	3–0	2–2	0–1	1–0	0–2	1–1	3–0	0–0	2–0	2–3	0–1		1–2	2–1	0–0	2–0	1–2	2–1
Ventforet Kofu	1–1	2–2	2–1	1–0	1–1	0–0	1–2	1–0	0–2	4–1	0–0	2–0	0–3	2–0	2–1	1–0		3–1	3–2	2–1	2–1	1–1
Tokyo Verdy	1–1	1–2	3–0	0–1	1–0	4–1	0–2	2–0	2–1	1–0	0–2	2–0	0–1	2–0	4–1	3–1	1–3		2–0	2–0	0–1	1–1
Tokushima Vortis	0–4	0–0	3–0	1–2	3–0	3–0	1–1	1–2	0–3	3–0	2–2	1–1	2–4	0–0	0–1	0–4	0–2	2–1		1–0	1–2	1–0
Matsumoto Yamaga	2–2	1–1	1–1	3–0	7–1	1–0	1–0	2–1	1–0	0–3	1–2	0–0	0–0	0–2	0–2	0–0	1–1	3–2	1–1		0–2	3–0
Yokohama FC	1–1	1–0	0–0	0–1	3–1	3–2	1–2	2–1	0–1	3–0	1–2	2–0	2–1	3–0	1–3	0–1	0–2	0–0	1–0	1–1		2–4
Machida Zelvia	0–1	0–3	2–4	2–2	0–0	1–0	0–1	0–0	1–6	3–2	0–0	1–0	1–2	0–2	0–3	1–3	0–1	1–2	1–0	0–1	0–4	

Updated to match(es) played on 11 November 2012. Source: J. League Division 2
Legend: Blue = home team win; Yellow = draw; Red = away team win.

== Top scorers ==
Rank	Scorer	Club	Goals
1	(Brazil) Davi	Ventforet Kofu	32
2	(Japan) Takuma Abe	Tokyo Verdy	18
2	(Japan) Kengo Kawamata	Fagiano Okayama	18
4	(Japan) Yoshihito Fujita	JEF United Chiba	15
5	(Japan) Koki Arita	Ehime FC	14
5	(Japan) Jin Hanato	Giravanz Kitakyushu	14
5	(Japan) Kazushi Mitsuhira	Oita Trinita	14
5	(Japan) Yasuhito Morishima	Oita Trinita	14
5	(Japan) Atsutaka Nakamura	Kyoto Sanga	14
5	(Japan) Kosuke Taketomi	Roasso Kumamoto	14
11	(Japan) Takayuki Funayama	Matsumoto Yamaga	12
11	(Japan) Hisashi Jogo	Avispa Fukuoka	12
11	(Japan) Tetsuya Ōkubo	Yokohama FC	12

Updated to games played on 11 November 2012
Source: J. League

== Attendances ==
Pos	Team	Total	High	Low	Average	Change
1	Ventforet Kofu	218,539	16,643	6,161	10,407	−14.0%^{†}
2	Oita Trinita	204,134	23,617	6,459	9,721	+10.7%
3	Matsumoto Yamaga	200,143	13,098	4,471	9,531	+27.7%^{‡}
4	JEF United Chiba	194,893	14,487	6,235	9,281	−4.1%
5	Fagiano Okayama	167,691	12,618	3,946	7,985	+10.0%
6	Montedio Yamagata	154,459	11,275	5,036	7,355	−21.1%^{†}
7	Kyoto Sanga	152,732	12,296	2,901	7,273	+15.6%
8	Shonan Bellmare	143,887	10,918	3,602	6,852	−1.3%
9	Yokohama FC	126,810	9,687	2,639	6,039	+4.7%
10	Roasso Kumamoto	122,956	10,530	3,127	5,855	−15.5%
11	Avispa Fukuoka	117,309	10,902	3,092	5,586	−46.4%^{†}
12	Tokyo Verdy	112,158	13,093	2,875	5,341	−6.5%
13	FC Gifu	89,676	11,119	1,791	4,270	+3.6%
14	Tokushima Vortis	83,808	7,526	1,933	3,991	−23.4%
15	Mito HollyHock	83,431	6,920	2,241	3,973	+18.6%
16	Tochigi SC	80,859	5,156	1,901	3,850	−22.0%
17	Ehime FC	76,201	6,612	1,950	3,629	+4.4%
18	Machida Zelvia	76,169	7,139	1,860	3,627	+3.2%^{‡}
19	Giravanz Kitakyushu	70,274	7,637	2,112	3,346	−17.4%
20	Thespa Kusatsu	70,159	6,891	1,333	3,341	+4.0%
21	Kataller Toyama	69,807	6,549	1,692	3,324	+1.5%
22	Gainare Tottori	65,786	6,629	1,363	3,133	−15.1%
	League total	2,681,881	23,617	1,333	5,805	−9.6%

Updated to games played on 11 November 2012
Source: J. League Division 2
Notes:
^{†} Team played previous season in J1.
^{‡} Team played previous season in JFL.

== Promotion Playoffs to Division 1 ==
2012 J.League Road To J1 Play-Offs (2012 J1昇格プレーオフ)
The schedule was as follows. The format would be changed if one or more of the involved clubs could not meet the promotion criteria to Division 1.

If the score tied by 90 minutes, the winner would be determined by the league standings.

Semifinals
3	Kyoto Sanga	0
6	Oita Trinita	4
4	Yokohama FC	0
5	JEF United Chiba	4

Final
6	Oita Trinita	1
5	JEF United Chiba	0

=== Semifinals ===
18 November 2012
14:00

Kyoto Sanga	0–4	Oita Trinita
		Morishima 17', 31', 66', 90'

Nishikyogoku Athletic Stadium, Ukyō-ku, Kyoto
Attendance: 10,760
Referee: Hajime Matsuo

18 November 2012
14:00

Yokohama FC	0–4	JEF United Chiba
		Fujita 35', 58'; Yonekura 53'; Sato 88'

Mitsuzawa Stadium, Kanagawa-ku, Yokohama
Attendance: 10,594
Referee: Nobosugu Murakami

=== Final ===
23 November 2012
13:05

Oita Trinita	1–0	JEF United Chiba
Hayashi 86'

National Olympic Stadium, Shinjuku, Tokyo
Attendance: 27,433
Referee: Yuichi Nishimura

Oita Trinita promoted to J.League Division 1.
