= 2014 Albirex Niigata Singapore FC season =

Albirex Niigata FC (Singapore)
2014 season
- Chairman: Daisuke Korenaga
- Head Coach: Tatsuyuki Okuyama
- Stadium: Jurong East Stadium
- S.League: 5th
- Singapore Cup: Quarter-final
- Singapore League Cup: Quarter-final
- Top goalscorer: League: Kazuki Sakamoto (21); All: Kazuki Sakamoto (26)
Home colours	Away colours

The 2014 season was Albirex Niigata FC (Singapore)'s 11th season in the S.League.

Tatsuyuki Okuyama began the season as the White Swan's new head coach after taking over from Koichi Sugiyama, whose contracted ended after 4 years in charge.

Organised by Albirex Singapore Pte Ltd, in partnership with JAPAN Soccer College; the player selection for the coming season was held in Japan, 16 December at Saitama Stadium 2002 and 19 December at J-Green Sakai Stadium. The selected candidates would either earn a professional contract with Albirex Niigata FC (Singapore) in the S.League, Albirex Niigata Phnom Penh in the Cambodian League or admission into the JAPAN Soccer College.

== Sponsors ==
- Main Sponsor: Canon
- Uniform Sponsors for S.League: Yoppy, TDK-Lambda, RAIZZIN, Langrich
- Club Sponsors: COMM Pte Ltd, Mitsubishi Corporation, Kikkoman, Paris Miki, RGF Singapore, Daiho, WINN, SOODE, Kirin, CLEO, Nihon Assist Singapore, Sanpoutei Ramen, aguchi, ProtecA
- Apparel Sponsor: Mafro Sports
- Club Albirex: JTB, TAWARAYA, Shogakukan Asia, Konohana Kindergarten, Niigata Kenjinkai Singapore, Keihin Multi-Trans (S) Pte Ltd, IKYU, Hitachi, Taiyou Kouhatsuden Mura, IPPIN, CROWNLINE Singapore, Samurice, Porterhouse, NIKKEI, Zipan Resort Travel

== S.League Results ==
Date	Opponents	H / A	Result F–A	Scorers
22 February 2014	Brunei DPMM	H	0–1	
27 February 2014	Harimau Muda B	H	3–0	Yamada 59', Sakamoto 68', Okazaki 76']
12 March 2014	Hougang United	A	3–1	Sakamoto 15'
21 March 2014	Balestier Khalsa	H	1–0	Sakamoto 44'
26 March 2014	Woodlands Wellington	A	1–1	Nishida 90+5'
4 April 2014	Tanjong Pagar United	H	2–1	Hotta 77', Sakamoto 83'
10 April 2014	Young Lions	A	1–2	El-Masri 18' (O.G.), Sakamoto 62'
16 April 2014	Warriors	H	0–4	
27 April 2014	Home United	H	4–2	Sakamoto (2) 10', 62', Okazaki 57', Hotta 68'
1 May 2014	Tampines Rovers	A	1–1	Hotta 68'
8 May 2014	Geylang International	H	4–2	Sakamoto 12', Hotta 55', Okazaki 71', Nagasaki 80'
14 May 2014	Brunei DPMM	A	2–1	Yamada 53'
23 May 2014	Harimau Muda B	A	0–4	Sakamoto (3) 28', 66', 76', Nishida 49'
5 June 2014	Hougang United	H	0–1	
8 June 2014	Balestier Khalsa	A	1–1	Tanaka 20'
11 June 2014	Woodlands Wellington	H	7–1	Matsuda 12', Sakamoto (3) 15', 31', 73' (Pen.), Kawakami 17', Yamada 45', Fukuzaki 87'
18 June 2014	Tanjong Pagar United	A	1–2	Nagasaki 3', Ota 59'
22 June 2014	Young Lions	H	4–2	Sakamoto 12', Tanaka 38', Nagasaki 63', Okazaki 67'
1 August 2014	Warriors	A	1–3	Ota 20', Sakamoto 42', Nagasaki 87'
21 August 2014	Home United	A	4–2	Okazaki 2', Sakamoto 73'
25 August 2014	Tampines Rovers	H	2–2	Sakamoto (2) 74', 88'
28 August 2014	Geylang International	A	3–4	Sakamoto 44', Akasaka 58', Ota 69', Kawakami 90'
17 September 2014	Tampines Rovers	A	0–0	
6 October 2014	Balestier Khalsa	A	2–0	
24 October 2014	Home United	H	2–1	Nagasaki 9', Sakamoto 31'
28 October 2014	Brunei DPMM	H	0–1	
31 October 2014	Warriors	A	1–0	

== S.League table ==
Pos	Team	Pld	W	D	L	GF	GA	GD	Pts	Qualification
3	Tampines Rovers	27	14	7	6	44	32	+12	49	
4	Home United	27	13	5	9	52	41	+11	44	
5	(Japan) Albirex Niigata (S) (Note: The three foreign clubs – Albirex Niigata (S), DPMM FC and Harimau Muda B – as well as the Football Association of Singapore (FAS) under-23 team, Young Lions, are not eligible for any AFC competition spots.)	27	13	5	9	51	40	+11	44	
6	Balestier Khalsa	27	11	7	9	46	34	+12	40	Qualification to AFC Cup Group Stage (Note: Qualified as 2014 Singapore Cup winners.)
7	Hougang United	27	12	6	9	49	42	+7	42	

Source: RSSSF
Rules for classification: 1) points; 2) goal difference; 3) number of goals scored

== Singapore Cup ==
Albirex Niigata (S) is drawn with Svay Rieng from the Cambodian League in the preliminary round of the Singapore Cup. The draw was made on 3 May 2014 at Jalan Besar Stadium. The tie took place on 28 May 2014. The White Swans won the Cambodian side 3–0, knocking them out of the competition. Over the 2-legged Quarter-finals, Albirex lost 3–4 and 1–2 to Brunei DPMM, resulting in their exit.

Date	Round	Opponents	H / A	Result F–A	Scorers
28 May 2014	Preliminary	Svay Rieng	A	0–3	Okazaki 9', Sakamoto 37', Fukuzaki 61'
29 June 2014	Quarter-final 1st leg	Brunei DPMM	H	3–4	Okazaki 34', Ota 56', Sakamoto 63'
4 July 2014	Quarter-final 2nd leg	Brunei DPMM	A	2–1	Kawakami 86'

== Singapore League Cup ==
Albirex Niigata (S) came in 3rd in the 2013 S.League, hence were placed in Pot A together with Tampines Rovers, Home United and Balestier Khalsa. The draw took place at Jalan Besar Stadium on 20 June 2014. The White Swans were drawn into Group A; playing away to Tanjong Pagar United on 7 July 2014 and home to Police Sports Association on 10 July 2014. Albirex lost 4–0 to the Jaguars followed by the trashing of NFL side 13–0. Their next opponent in the quarter-final would be Geylang International. The game was played on 18 July 2014 at Jalan Besar Stadium. Former defender Kento Fukuda scored the opening goal in the 20th minute which the first half ended at 1–0 to the Eagles. 9 minutes after the break, Argentinian striker Leonel Felice doubled the lead. Former Eagle Norihiro Kawakami pulled one back on the 70th minute, but a late Hafiz Nor strike sealed the victory for Geylang, putting Albirex out of the competition.

Date	Round	Opponents	H / A	Result F–A	Scorers
7 July 2014	Preliminary 1st leg	Tanjong Pagar United	A	4–0	
10 July 2014	Preliminary 2nd leg	Police Sports Association	H	13–0	Fukuzaki (2) 5', 25', Kawakami (2) 22', 45', Sakamoto (3) 29', 65', 90', Yamada (2) 40', 74', Okazaki (2) 50', 54', Ota 88', Nishio 89'
18 July 2014	Quarter-final	Geylang International	A	1–3	Kawakami 70'

== Squad statistics ==
No.	Pos.	Name	League		Singapore Cup		League Cup		Total		Discipline	
No.	Pos.	Name	Apps	Goals	Apps	Goals	Apps	Goals	Apps	Goals	Yellow card	Red card
1	GK	(Japan) Kenjiro Ogino	14	0	2	0	3	0	19	0	3	0
2	DF	(Japan) Taiyo Nishida	13(5)	2	1(1)	0	0	0	20	2	4	0
3	DF	(Japan) Hayato Nokata	0	0	0	0	0	0	0	0	0	0
3	DF	(Japan) Kento Fujihara	24	0	3	0	3	0	30	0	2	0
4	FW	(Japan) Yusuke Ueda	1(6)	0	0	0	0	0	7	0	0	0
4	DF	(Japan) Norihiro Kawakami	12	2	2	1	3	3	17	6	1	0
5	MF	(Japan) Koki Akasaka	26	1	2(1)	0	3	0	32	1	4	0
6	DF	(Japan) Itsuki Yamada	27	3	3	0	3	2	33	5	3	0
7	MF	(Japan) Keisuke Ota	27	3	3	1	3	1	33	5	3	0
8	MF	(Japan) Kosuke Matsuda	27	1	3	0	3	0	33	1	3	0
9	MF	(Japan) Kazuya Okazaki	20(4)	5	3	2	3	3	30	11	3	0
10	MF	(Japan) Kento Nagasaki	22(5)	5	3	0	1(1)	0	32	5	0	0
11	FW	(Japan) Kazuki Sakamoto	26(1)	21	3	2	3	3	33	26	2	0
13	MF	(Japan) Koya Yoshida	0(5)	0	0	0	0	0	5	0	0	0
14	MF	(Japan) Kazuya Fukuzaki	2(8)	1	0(2)	1	2(1)	1	15	3	1	0
15	DF	(Japan) Soichiro Tanaka	17(1)	2	3	0	0(3)	0	24	2	4	0
16	MF	(Japan) Hiroki Morisaki	4(12)	0	1	0	0	0	17	0	1	0
17	FW	(Japan) Ikuma Osaka	0(5)	0	0(1)	0	0(2)	0	8	0	0	0
18	FW	(Japan) Niji Sasadaira	0	0	0(1)	0	0	0	1	0	0	0
19	DF	(Japan) Shota Muto	0	0	0	0	0	0	0	0	0	0
20	DF	(Japan) Kentaro Miyakawa	0(1)	0	0	0	0	0	1	0	0	0
21	FW	(Japan) Yoshinaga Arima	0(4)	0	0	0	0	0	4	0	0	0
22	GK	(Japan) Kazuki Kishigami	13	0	1	0	0	0	14	0	0	0
23	DF	(Japan) Shuhei Hotta	22	4	1(1)	0	3	0	27	4	3	0
24	MF	(Japan) Kaoru Nishio	0	0	0	0	0(1)	1	1	1	0	0
25	MF	(Japan) Seiji Yamaguchi	0	0	0	0	0	0	0	0	0	0
26	GK	(Japan) Junki Kato	0	0	0	0	0	0	0	0	0	0
26	GK	(Japan) Mizuki Ito	0	0	0	0	0	0	0	0	0	0
—	–	Own goals	–	1	–	0	–	0	–	0	–	–

== Transfers ==
=== In ===
Date	Pos.	Name	From	Fee
26 December 2013	MF	(Japan) Kosuke Matsuda	(Japan) Kyoto Sangyo University	Undisclosed
28 December 2013	GK	(Japan) Kazuki Kishigami	(Japan) Ritsumeikan University	Undisclosed
29 December 2013	MF	(Japan) Keisuka Ota	(Japan) Kamatamare Sanuki	Undisclosed
29 December 2013	DF	(Japan) Hayato Nokata	(Japan) FC Gifu SECOND	Undisclosed
1 January 2014	MF	(Japan) Koki Akasaka	(Japan) JAPAN Soccer College	
1 January 2014	MF	(Japan) Koya Yoshida	(Japan) JAPAN Soccer College	
1 January 2014	DF	(Japan) Soichiro Tanaka	(Japan) JAPAN Soccer College	
1 January 2014	FW	(Japan) Niji Sasadaira	(Japan) JAPAN Soccer College	
1 January 2014	DF	(Japan) Shota Muto	(Japan) JAPAN Soccer College	
1 January 2014	DF	(Japan) Kentaro Miyakawa	(Japan) JAPAN Soccer College	
1 January 2014	MF	(Japan) Kaoru Nishio	(Japan) JAPAN Soccer College	
1 January 2014	MF	(Japan) Seiji Yamaguchi	(Japan) JAPAN Soccer College	
24 January 2014	DF	(Japan) Kento Fujihara	(Japan) Kansai University	Undisclosed
29 January 2014	DF	(Japan) Taiyo Nishida	(Japan) Osaka Sangyo University	Undisclosed
17 February 2014	FW	(Japan) Yusuke Ueda	(Japan) Sagawa Printing Kyoto SC	Undisclosed
13 March 2014	Coach	(Japan) Tomoaki Sasaki	Unattached	Undisclosed
7 June 2014	DF	(Japan) Norihiro Kawakami	(Japan) Tampines Rovers	Undisclosed

=== Out ===
Date	Pos.	Name	To	Fee
1 December 2013	DF	(Japan) Kento Fukuda	(Singapore) Geylang International	Undisclosed
1 December 2013	DF	(Japan) Yuki Ichikawa	(Singapore) Geylang International	Undisclosed
3 December 2013	MF	(Japan) Gentaro Murakami	(Malta) Msida Saint-Joseph F.C.	Free
3 December 2013	DF	(Japan) Tatsuya Sase	(Cambodia) Albirex Niigata Phnom Penh	Free
3 December 2013	DF	(Japan) Takaaki Usami	Released	Free
3 December 2013	FW	(Japan) Kazuki Hiroshi	Released	Free
3 December 2013	DF	(Japan) Yuya Nagae	Released	Free
3 December 2013	DF	(Japan) Naotoshi Ito	Released	Free
3 December 2013	DF	(Japan) Yu Takano	Released	Free
3 December 2013	FW	(Japan) Katsumi Takahashi	Released	Free
1 January 2014	DF	(Japan) Masahiro Ishikawa	(Japan) Grulla Morioka	Free
5 January 2014	FW	(Brazil) Bruno Castanheira	(Singapore) Home United	Undisclosed
14 January 2014	MF	(Japan) Takeshi Nagasawa	Released	Free
14 January 2014	MF	(Japan) Masatake Sato	(Japan) JAPAN Soccer College	Free
16 January 2013	GK	(Japan) Hiroaki Hara	(Japan) Arterivo Wakayama	Free
25 January 2014	DF	(Japan) Hayato Nokata	(Cambodia) Albirex Niigata Phnom Penh	Undisclosed
12 March 2014	GK	(Japan) Junki Kato	(Cambodia) Albirex Niigata Phnom Penh	Undisclosed
2 April 2014	MF	(Japan) Shingo Suzuki	Retired	
10 April 2014	Coach	(Japan) Yuki Matsuda	Release	Free
15 May 2014	FW	(Japan) Yusuke Ueda	(Cambodia) Albirex Niigata Phnom Penh	Undisclosed

=== Loan in ===
Date from	Date to	Pos.	Name	From
1 January 2014	30 November 2014	MF	(Japan) Kazuya Okazaki	(Japan) Fagiano Okayama Next

== Team Staff ==
Team Manager: (Singapore) Yeo Junxian
Coach: (Japan) Tomoaki Sasaki
Goalkeeper Coach: (Japan) Mizuki Ito
Trainer: (Japan) Kohei Tanaka
