= Moriyasu =

Moriyasu (written: 森保 or 森安) is a Japanese surname. Notable people with the surname include:

- Hajime Moriyasu (森保 一, born 1968), Japanese footballer and manager
- Hirofumi Moriyasu (森安 洋文, born 1985), Japanese footballer
- Hiroshi Moriyasu (森保 洋, born 1972), Japanese footballer
- Shohei Moriyasu (森保 翔平, born 1991), Japanese footballer
- Shotaro Moriyasu (1924–1955), Japanese jazz pianist

Moriyasu (written: 盛康) is also a masculine Japanese given name. Notable people with the name include:

- Moriyasu Hidaka (日高 盛康), Imperial Japanese Navy officer
