= 2018 Albirex Niigata season =

Albirex Niigata
2018 season
- Manager: Masakazu Suzuki; Koichiro Katafuchi
- Stadium: Denka Big Swan Stadium
- J2 League: 16th
Home colours	Away colours

2018 Albirex Niigata season.

== J2 League ==
Match	Date	Team	Score	Team	Venue	Attendance
1	2018.02.25	Kamatamare Sanuki	0-1	Albirex Niigata	Pikara Stadium	4,539
2	2018.03.03	Albirex Niigata	1-1	Matsumoto Yamaga FC	Denka Big Swan Stadium	22,465
3	2018.03.11	Albirex Niigata	1-1	Kyoto Sanga FC	Denka Big Swan Stadium	14,239
4	2018.03.17	Yokohama FC	0-3	Albirex Niigata	NHK Spring Mitsuzawa Football Stadium	7,700
5	2018.03.21	Albirex Niigata	0-1	Ehime FC	Denka Big Swan Stadium	12,796
6	2018.03.25	Albirex Niigata	1-0	Tokushima Vortis	Denka Big Swan Stadium	13,576
7	2018.04.01	Roasso Kumamoto	3-1	Albirex Niigata	Egao Kenko Stadium	4,691
8	2018.04.08	Albirex Niigata	0-1	Fagiano Okayama	Denka Big Swan Stadium	11,783
9	2018.04.15	Tochigi SC	2-1	Albirex Niigata	Tochigi Green Stadium	6,630
10	2018.04.22	Albirex Niigata	0-1	Omiya Ardija	Denka Big Swan Stadium	15,323
11	2018.04.28	Renofa Yamaguchi FC	1-2	Albirex Niigata	Ishin Me-Life Stadium	6,374
12	2018.05.03	Zweigen Kanazawa	2-3	Albirex Niigata	Ishikawa Athletics Stadium	9,497
13	2018.05.06	Albirex Niigata	1-2	Oita Trinita	Denka Big Swan Stadium	19,020
14	2018.05.12	JEF United Chiba	1-2	Albirex Niigata	Fukuda Denshi Arena	12,078
15	2018.05.20	Albirex Niigata	0-0	Montedio Yamagata	Denka Big Swan Stadium	18,397
16	2018.05.26	FC Gifu	2-1	Albirex Niigata	Gifu Nagaragawa Stadium	7,254
18	2018.06.10	Albirex Niigata	1-2	Tokyo Verdy	Denka Big Swan Stadium	14,653
19	2018.06.16	Avispa Fukuoka	0-2	Albirex Niigata	Level5 Stadium	9,467
17	2018.06.20	Albirex Niigata	1-5	Ventforet Kofu	Denka Big Swan Stadium	8,614
20	2018.06.24	FC Machida Zelvia	0-0	Albirex Niigata	Machida Stadium	5,009
21	2018.06.30	Albirex Niigata	1-1	Mito HollyHock	Denka Big Swan Stadium	15,759
22	2018.07.07	Matsumoto Yamaga FC	2-0	Albirex Niigata	Matsumotodaira Park Stadium	14,166
23	2018.07.15	Albirex Niigata	0-1	Yokohama FC	Denka Big Swan Stadium	16,813
24	2018.07.21	Montedio Yamagata	1-2	Albirex Niigata	ND Soft Stadium Yamagata	11,101
25	2018.07.25	Tokyo Verdy	4-3	Albirex Niigata	Ajinomoto Stadium	4,534
26	2018.07.29	Albirex Niigata	1-2	JEF United Chiba	Denka Big Swan Stadium	13,375
27	2018.08.05	Oita Trinita	4-0	Albirex Niigata	Oita Bank Dome	5,635
28	2018.08.11	Albirex Niigata	0-3	Tochigi SC	Denka Big Swan Stadium	15,103
29	2018.08.18	Omiya Ardija	2-1	Albirex Niigata	NACK5 Stadium Omiya	11,260
30	2018.08.26	Albirex Niigata	0-3	Avispa Fukuoka	Denka Big Swan Stadium	10,463
31	2018.09.01	Ehime FC	0-0	Albirex Niigata	Ningineer Stadium	3,216
32	2018.09.08	Albirex Niigata	5-0	FC Gifu	Denka Big Swan Stadium	11,274
33	2018.09.15	Albirex Niigata	2-1	Zweigen Kanazawa	Denka Big Swan Stadium	15,011
34	2018.09.23	Mito HollyHock	0-1	Albirex Niigata	K's denki Stadium Mito	7,110
35	2018.09.29	Fagiano Okayama	1-2	Albirex Niigata	City Light Stadium	6,170
36	2018.10.06	Albirex Niigata	2-1	Kamatamare Sanuki	Denka Big Swan Stadium	15,892
37	2018.10.13	Ventforet Kofu	0-0	Albirex Niigata	Yamanashi Chuo Bank Stadium	8,418
38	2018.10.20	Kyoto Sanga FC	0-2	Albirex Niigata	Kyoto Nishikyogoku Athletic Stadium	8,883
39	2018.10.28	Albirex Niigata	2-0	FC Machida Zelvia	Denka Big Swan Stadium	16,091
40	2018.11.03	Albirex Niigata	2-3	Roasso Kumamoto	Denka Big Swan Stadium	16,479
41	2018.11.11	Tokushima Vortis	0-0	Albirex Niigata	Pocarisweat Stadium	5,735
42	2018.11.17	Albirex Niigata	0-2	Renofa Yamaguchi FC	Denka Big Swan Stadium	16,054
