= Liam Hutchinson =

Welsh footballer (born 1991)

Personal information
- Date of birth: 11 February 1991 (age 35)
- Place of birth: Pontypridd, Wales
- Height: 1.92 m (6 ft 4 in)
- Position: Defensive midfielder

Team information
- Current team: Haverfordwest County

Youth career
- Ysgol Gyfun Y Cymmer (Cymmer Secondary School)

College career
Years	Team	Apps	(Gls)
2007–2009	Pencoed College		

Senior career*
Years	Team	Apps	(Gls)
2010–2011	Ton Pentre		
2011–2013	Cambrian & Clydach		
2013	Bunbury Forum Force SC		
2013–2014	Phnom Penh Crown FC		
2014–2015	Bemerton Heath Harlequins		
2015–	Haverfordwest County		

International career
2007–2009	Welsh Colleges Team	6	
2013	Wales (futsal)		
- * Club domestic league appearances and goals

Liam Hutchinson (born 11 February 1991) is a Welsh footballer who plays for Haverfordwest County of the Welsh Football League Division One as of 2015.

== Australia ==
Was voted as Bunbury Forum Force's Best and Fairest player for 2013.

== Cambodia ==
Specializing in dead-ball situations, Hutchinson trailed with Cambodian club Phnom Penh Crown in late 2013, scoring his first goal for the team in a 7-3 friendly win over Albirex Niigata Phnom Penh. He then signed for the club in November that year, forming a foreign triumvirate with Nigerians Odion Obadin and George Bisan; however, in January 2014, the Welshman's stint in Cambodia was cut short as he left to Wales for personal reasons.
