= Satoru Kobayashi (footballer) =

Japanese footballer

Satoru Kobayashi 小林 悟
Personal information
- Full name: Satoru Kobayashi
- Date of birth: August 26, 1973 (age 53)
- Place of birth: Gunma, Japan
- Height: 1.72 m (5 ft 7 1/2 in)
- Position: Defender

Youth career
- 1989–1991: Bunan High School

Senior career*
Years	Team	Apps	(Gls)
1992–1998	Omiya Ardija	103	(8)
1999–2000	Sagan Tosu	46	(4)
2001–2002	Albirex Niigata	52	(2)
Total		201	(14)
- * Club domestic league appearances and goals

Satoru Kobayashi (小林 悟, Kobayashi Satoru; born August 26, 1973) is a former Japanese football player.

== Playing career ==
Kobayashi was born in Gunma Prefecture on August 26, 1973. After graduating from high school, he joined the Japan Football League club NTT Kanto (later Omiya Ardija) in 1992. Although he did not play much at first, he played often in 1994. In 1999, he moved to the newly promoted J2 League club, Sagan Tosu. He played often as a side back and side midfielder over two seasons until 2000. In May 2001, he joined the J2 club Albirex Niigata. Although he did play much in 2001, he became a regular player as a right side back in 2002. He retired at the end of the 2002 season.

== Career statistics ==
Appearances and goals by club, season and competition
Club	Season	League			Emperor's Cup		J.League Cup		Total	
Club	Season	Division	Apps	Goals	Apps	Goals	Apps	Goals	Apps	Goals
NTT Kanto	1992	Football League	5	0	—		—		5	0
NTT Kanto	1993	Football League	3	0	—		—		3	0
NTT Kanto	1994	Football League	25	4	—		—		25	4
NTT Kanto	1995	Football League	11	0	—		—		11	0
NTT Kanto	1996	Football League	13	0	3	0	—		16	0
NTT Kanto	1997	Football League	26	3	3	1	—		29	4
Omiya Ardija	1998	Football League	20	1	0	0	—		20	1
Sagan Tosu	1999	J2 League	26	2	3	0	1	0	30	2
Sagan Tosu	2000	J2 League	20	2	2	0	2	0	24	2
Albirex Niigata	2001	J2 League	13	1	1	0	0	0	14	1
Albirex Niigata	2002	J2 League	39	1	0	0	—		39	1
Career total			201	14	12	1	3	0	216	15
