= 2015 Hun Sen Cup =

Tournament details
- Country: Cambodia
- Dates: 08 Jan – 14 Feb 2015
- Teams: 27

Final positions
- Champions: Svay Rieng FC
- Runners-up: Nagaworld

Tournament statistics
- Top goal scorer: Mony Udom (24 goals)

The Hun Sen Cup is the main football knockout tournament in Cambodia. It involves the Cambodian League and provincial teams organized by the Football Federation of Cambodia. The 2015 Hun Sen Cup was the 9th season. National Police Commissary were the defending champions, having beaten Build Bright United 2–0 in the previous season's final.

== Qualifying round ==
There were 19 teams from Phnom Penh and other provinces divided into six regions. The remaining eight teams came from a qualifying round, with the eight teams (rank 1 to 8) of the Cambodian League 2014 entering the group stage.

- Phnom Penh Region (arranged in Phnom Penh): Eight teams in two groups, the top one of each group with the one best second-ranked team going through to the group stage.

Group A: National Defense, Western Phnom Penh, Civil Aviation and Khan Chbar Ampov. (Qualified team: National Defense)

Group B: Kirivong Sok Sen Chey, Albirex Niigata Phnom Penh, Khan Toul Kok and Khan Chroy Changvar. (Qualified teams: Kirivong Sok Sen Chey and Albirex Niigata Phnom Penh)

- East Region (arranged in Prey Veng): Prey Veng, Thbong Khmum and Kandal (Qualified team: Prey Veng)
- Centre Region (arranged in Kampong Thom): Kampong Thom, Siem Reap and Oddar Meanchey (Qualified team: Siem Reap)
- West Region: Qualified team Battambang, only one team participated.
- North Region: Qualified team Kratie, only one team participated.
- South Region (arranged in Takeo): Takeo, Kep and Kampot (Qualified team: Kampot)

== Group stage ==
The teams finishing in the top two positions in each of the four groups (highlighted in tables) in the group stage progressed to the quarter-finals.

=== Group A ===
| Pos. | Team | GP | W | D | L | GF | GA | GD | Pts |
|---|---|---|---|---|---|---|---|---|---|
| 1 | Police Commissary | 3 | 3 | 0 | 0 | 13 | 1 | 12 | 9 |
| 2 | Albirex Niigata | 3 | 2 | 0 | 1 | 12 | 2 | 10 | 6 |
| 3 | Thbong Khmum Province | 3 | 0 | 1 | 2 | 1 | 9 | -8 | 1 |
| 4 | Kratie Province FC | 3 | 0 | 1 | 2 | 1 | 15 | -14 | 1 |

| 21 January 2015 | Police Commissary | 7–0 | Thbong Khmum |
| 21 January 2015 | Kratie | 0–10 | Albirex Niigata Phnom Penh |
| 24 January 2015 | Kratie | 1–1 | Thbong Khmum |
| 24 January 2015 | Police Commissary | 2–1 | Albirex Niigata Phnom Penh |
| 27 January 2015 | Kratie | 0–4 | Police Commissary |
| 27 January 2015 | Thbong Khmum | 0–1 | Albirex Niigata Phnom Penh |

=== Group B ===
| Pos. | Team | GP | W | D | L | GF | GA | GD | Pts |
|---|---|---|---|---|---|---|---|---|---|
| 1 | Cambodian Tiger | 3 | 2 | 1 | 0 | 14 | 2 | 12 | 7 |
| 2 | Build Bright United | 3 | 2 | 0 | 1 | 8 | 3 | 5 | 6 |
| 3 | Kirivong Sok Sen Chey | 3 | 0 | 2 | 1 | 3 | 5 | -2 | 2 |
| 4 | Kampot Province FC | 3 | 0 | 1 | 2 | 2 | 17 | -15 | 1 |

| 21 January 2015 | Cambodian Tiger | 1–1 | Kirivong Sok Sen Chey |
| 21 January 2015 | Build Bright United | 5–0 | Kompot |
| 24 January 2015 | Build Bright United | 3–1 | Kirivong Sok Sen Chey |
| 24 January 2015 | Cambodian Tiger | 11–1 | Kompot |
| 27 January 2015 | Kirivong Sok Sen Chey | 1–1 | Kompot |
| 27 January 2015 | Build Bright United | 0–2 | Cambodian Tiger |

=== Group C ===
| Pos. | Team | GP | W | D | L | GF | GA | GD | Pts |
|---|---|---|---|---|---|---|---|---|---|
| 1 | Boeung Ket Angkor | 3 | 3 | 0 | 0 | 12 | 2 | +10 | 9 |
| 2 | Phnom Penh Crown | 3 | 2 | 0 | 1 | 19 | 1 | +18 | 6 |
| 3 | National Defense Ministry | 3 | 1 | 0 | 2 | 6 | 6 | 0 | 3 |
| 4 | Battambang Province FC | 3 | 0 | 0 | 3 | 3 | 31 | -28 | 0 |

| 22 January 2015 | Boeung Ket Angkor | 10–2 | Battambang |
| 22 January 2015 | Phnom Penh Crown | 4–0 | National Defense Ministry |
| 25 January 2015 | Boeung Ket Angkor | 1–0 | National Defense Ministry |
| 25 January 2015 | Phnom Penh Crown | 15–0 | Battambang |
| 28 January 2015 | Phnom Penh Crown | 0–1 | Boeung Ket Angkor |
| 28 January 2015 | Battambang | 1–6 | National Defense Ministry |

=== Group D ===
| Pos. | Team | GP | W | D | L | GF | GA | GD | Pts |
|---|---|---|---|---|---|---|---|---|---|
| 1 | Svay Rieng FC | 3 | 2 | 1 | 0 | 30 | 2 | +28 | 7 |
| 2 | Nagaworld | 3 | 2 | 1 | 0 | 20 | 2 | +18 | 7 |
| 3 | Siem Reap Province FC | 3 | 1 | 0 | 2 | 5 | 12 | -7 | 3 |
| 4 | Prey Veng Province FC | 3 | 0 | 0 | 3 | 3 | 42 | -39 | 0 |

| 22 January 2015 | Svay Rieng FC | 6–0 | Siem Reap |
| 22 January 2015 | Nagaworld | 15–0 | Prey Veng |
| 25 January 2015 | Svay Rieng FC | 23–1 | Prey Veng |
| 25 January 2015 | Nagaworld | 4–1 | Siem Reap |
| 28 January 2015 | Nagaworld | 1–1 | Svay Rieng FC |
| 28 January 2015 | Siem Reap | 4–2 | Prey Veng |

== Quarter-finals ==
31 January 2015
16:00

| National Police Commissary | 3–1 | Build Bright United |
|---|---|---|
| Tith Dina (?); Ly Arifin (?); Srey Udom (?) | Report | Bunhieng (?) |

Svay Rieng Stadium (Svay Rieng)
31 January 2015
18:30

| Cambodian Tiger | 2–0 | Albirex Niigata Phnom Penh |

Svay Rieng Stadium (Svay Rieng)
1 February 2015
16:00

| Boeung Ket Angkor | 0–3 | Nagaworld |
|---|---|---|
| | Report | Choun Chum 75', 84'; Prak Chanratana 89' |

Svay Rieng Stadium (Svay Rieng)
1 February 2015
18:00

| Svay Rieng FC | 4–1 | Phnom Penh Crown |

Svay Rieng Stadium(Svay Rieng)

== Semi-finals ==
11 February 2015
18:00

| Police Commissary | 0–0 (a.e.t.) | Nagaworld |
|---|---|---|
| | Report |
Penalties
| Tith Dina (penalty scored); Srey Udom (penalty missed); Moeung Phanith (penalty missed); San Thideth (penalty missed) | 1–3 | (penalty scored) Sun Sovannarith; (penalty scored) Sok Sengdara; (penalty scored) Teab Vathanak |

Svay Rieng Stadium, Svay Rieng
11 February 2015
18:30

| Svay Rieng FC | 2–0 | Cambodian Tiger |
|---|---|---|
| Prak Mony Udom 40', 88' | Report |

Svay Rieng Stadium, Svay Rieng
Attendance: Thong Chanketya

== Third place play-off ==
13 February 2015
18:30

| Police Commissary | 0–3 | Cambodian Tiger |

Svay Rieng Stadium, Svay Rieng

== Final ==
14 February 2015
18:30

| Svay Rieng FC | 2–1 | Nagaworld |
|---|---|---|
| Prak Mony Udom 45+1'; Nub Tola 90+1' | | Sun Sopanha 60' |

Svay Rieng Stadium, Svay Rieng
Referee: Tuy Vichhika

Hun Sen Cup 2015 Champions

Svay Rieng FC
3rd title

== Awards ==
- Top goal scorer (The golden boot): Prak Mony Udom of Svay Rieng FC (24 goals)
- Goalkeeper of the season (the golden glove): Am Sovannarath of Svay Rieng FC
- Fair Play: National Police Commissary

== See also ==
- 2015 Cambodian League
- Cambodian League
- Hun Sen Cup
