= Tomoya Osawa =

Tomoya Osawa may refer to:

- Tomoya Osawa (footballer, born 1984) (大沢 朋也), Japanese footballer
- Tomoya Osawa (footballer, born 2002) (大澤 朋也), Japanese footballer
