= Shimaoka =

Shimaoka (written: 島岡 lit. "island hill") is a Japanese surname. Notable people with the surname include:

- Kenji Shimaoka (嶋岡 健治, born 1949), Japanese volleyball player
- Kenta Shimaoka (島岡 健太, born 1973), Japanese footballer
- Tatsuzō Shimaoka (島岡 達三, 1919–2007), Japanese potter
