= Baldwin Ngwa =

Cameroonian footballer

Personal information
- Full name: Baldwin Ngwa Afa'nwi
- Date of birth: 22 May 1990 (age 36)
- Place of birth: Cameroon
- Position: Forward

Senior career*
Years	Team	Apps	(Gls)
2006–2007	Bamboutos FC		
2007–2008	Tiko United		
2008–2011	Gor Mahia		
2011–2012	JS Kairouan	3	(0)
2012	Gor Mahia		
2012–2013	Posta Rangers F.C.→(loan)		
2013	Majees SC		
2013–2014	JS Kairouan	1	(0)
2014	Phnom Penh Crown FC	0	(0)
2014	Asia Euro United	8	
2015	Nagaworld FC		
2016	Asia Euro United		
2017	National Police Commissary FC		
2018	Angkor Tiger	9	(1)
2020–2021	National Police Commissary	17	(7)
2022	ISI Dangkor Senchey	5	(3)
- * Club domestic league appearances and goals

Baldwin Ngwa Afa'nwi (born 22 May 1990) is a Cameroonian footballer who plays as a forward.

== Career ==
=== Kenya ===
Loaned to Kenyan club Rangers from Gor Mahia in 2012, Ngwa was debarred from playing in a 2–0 loss to Sofapaka during his stay there; following his loan spell, the Cameroonian intentionally cancelled his contract with Gor Mahia after one of their officials censured his decision to line up against his parent club, which, according to FIFA rules, is not allowed.

He took part in the 2012 CAF Champions League with Gor Mahia after returning from Tunisian club JS Kairouan.

=== Cambodia ===
A trialist for Phnom Penh Crown of the Cambodian League in 2014, Ngwa suffered a hamstring injury after trying out for Vietnamese team Than Quang Ninh at the start of the year. Next, he transferred to another Cambodian team, Asia Euro United, for the rest of the 2014 season where he put in a number of solid performances, including a hat-trick facing National Police that same year. This was succeeded by a move to Nagaworld FC in 2015, where he stayed until returning to Asia Euro United, authoring a brace in a 2–0 win over former club Phnom Penh Crown.

During his stay in Phnom Penh Crown, the striker netted three goals within 20 minutes in a friendly opposing Albirex Niigata Phnom Penh.
