= 2000 Sagan Tosu season =

Sagan Tosu
2000 season
- Manager: Kazuhiro Koso
- Stadium: Tosu Stadium
- J.League 2: 6th
- Emperor's Cup: 3rd Round
- J.League Cup: 1st Round
- Top goalscorer: Luciano (9)
Home colours	Away colours

2000 Sagan Tosu season

== Competitions ==
Competitions	Position
J.League 2	6th / 11 clubs
Emperor's Cup	3rd round
J.League Cup	1st round

== Domestic results ==
=== J.League 2 ===
12 March 2000 1	Sagan Tosu	0-4	Consadole Sapporo	Tosu Stadium
JST (UTC+09)

19 March 2000 2	Sagan Tosu	2-1	Albirex Niigata	Tosu Stadium
JST (UTC+09)

26 March 2000 3	Vegalta Sendai	0-1 (GG) (a.e.t.)	Sagan Tosu	Sendai Stadium
JST (UTC+09)

30 March 2000 4	Sagan Tosu	0-7	Urawa Red Diamonds	Tosu Stadium
JST (UTC+09)

2 April 2000 5	Oita Trinita	2-0	Sagan Tosu	Saiki Stadium
JST (UTC+09)

9 April 2000 6	Sagan Tosu	2-0	Montedio Yamagata	Tosu Stadium
JST (UTC+09)

16 April 2000 7	Mito HollyHock	1-0 (GG) (a.e.t.)	Sagan Tosu	Hitachi Athletic Stadium
JST (UTC+09)

23 April 2000 8	Sagan Tosu	2-1	Shonan Bellmare	Tosu Stadium
JST (UTC+09)

28 April 2000 9	Omiya Ardija	0-0 (GG) (a.e.t.)	Sagan Tosu	Omiya Football Stadium
JST (UTC+09)

10	bye

7 May 2000 11	Sagan Tosu	1-1 (GG) (a.e.t.)	Ventforet Kofu	Tosu Stadium
JST (UTC+09)

14 May 2000 12	Consadole Sapporo	2-0	Sagan Tosu	Sapporo Atsubetsu Park Stadium
JST (UTC+09)

18 May 2000 13	Albirex Niigata	0-0 (GG) (a.e.t.)	Sagan Tosu	Niigata City Athletic Stadium
JST (UTC+09)

21 May 2000 14	Sagan Tosu	1-2	Vegalta Sendai	Tosu Stadium
JST (UTC+09)

27 May 2000 15	Urawa Red Diamonds	3-1	Sagan Tosu	Urawa Komaba Stadium
JST (UTC+09)

1 June 2000 16	Sagan Tosu	0-1	Oita Trinita	Tosu Stadium
JST (UTC+09)

4 June 2000 17	Montedio Yamagata	1-0	Sagan Tosu	Yamagata Park Stadium
JST (UTC+09)

10 June 2000 18	Sagan Tosu	1-1 (GG) (a.e.t.)	Mito HollyHock	Tosu Stadium
JST (UTC+09)

17 June 2000 19	Shonan Bellmare	3-1	Sagan Tosu	Hiratsuka Athletics Stadium
JST (UTC+09)

21 June 2000 20	Sagan Tosu	3-0	Omiya Ardija	Saga Stadium
JST (UTC+09)

21	bye

2 July 2000 22	Ventforet Kofu	0-1	Sagan Tosu	Kose Sports Park Stadium
JST (UTC+09)

9 July 2000 23	Sagan Tosu	2-0	Urawa Red Diamonds	Tosu Stadium
JST (UTC+09)

22 July 2000 24	Oita Trinita	1-0	Sagan Tosu	Oita Athletic Stadium
JST (UTC+09)

29 July 2000 25	Sagan Tosu	1-0	Montedio Yamagata	Tosu Stadium
JST (UTC+09)

2 August 2000 26	Mito HollyHock	1-4	Sagan Tosu	Hitachinaka City Stadium
JST (UTC+09)

5 August 2000 27	Sagan Tosu	0-1 (GG) (a.e.t.)	Shonan Bellmare	Tosu Stadium
JST (UTC+09)

12 August 2000 28	Omiya Ardija	1-0	Sagan Tosu	Omiya Football Stadium
JST (UTC+09)

29	bye

27 August 2000 30	Sagan Tosu	3-0	Ventforet Kofu	Tosu Stadium
JST (UTC+09)

3 September 2000 31	Consadole Sapporo	1-2	Sagan Tosu	Sapporo Atsubetsu Park Stadium
JST (UTC+09)

10 September 2000 32	Sagan Tosu	2-2 (GG) (a.e.t.)	Albirex Niigata	Tosu Stadium
JST (UTC+09)

15 September 2000 33	Vegalta Sendai	0-1	Sagan Tosu	Sendai Stadium
JST (UTC+09)

24 September 2000 34	Sagan Tosu	0-2	Oita Trinita	Tosu Stadium
JST (UTC+09)

28 September 2000 35	Montedio Yamagata	2-0	Sagan Tosu	Yamagata Park Stadium
JST (UTC+09)

1 October 2000 36	Sagan Tosu	1-2 (GG) (a.e.t.)	Mito HollyHock	Tosu Stadium
JST (UTC+09)

8 October 2000 37	Shonan Bellmare	1-2 (GG) (a.e.t.)	Sagan Tosu	Hiratsuka Athletics Stadium
JST (UTC+09)

14 October 2000 38	Sagan Tosu	1-2	Omiya Ardija	Nagasaki Athletic Stadium
JST (UTC+09)

39	bye

29 October 2000 40	Ventforet Kofu	0-1	Sagan Tosu	Kose Sports Park Stadium
JST (UTC+09)

5 November 2000 41	Sagan Tosu	2-0	Consadole Sapporo	Tosu Stadium
JST (UTC+09)

11 November 2000 42	Albirex Niigata	1-0	Sagan Tosu	Niigata City Athletic Stadium
JST (UTC+09)

16 November 2000 43	Sagan Tosu	2-3 (GG) (a.e.t.)	Vegalta Sendai	Tosu Stadium
JST (UTC+09)

19 November 2000 44	Urawa Red Diamonds	2-1 (GG) (a.e.t.)	Sagan Tosu	Urawa Komaba Stadium
JST (UTC+09)

=== Emperor's Cup ===
25 November 2000 1st Round	Gifu Industries High School	1-7	Sagan Tosu	Gifu Nagaragawa Stadium
JST (UTC+09)

3 December 2000 2nd Round	Sagan Tosu	6-0	Kanagawa Teachers	Tosu Stadium
JST (UTC+09)

13 December 2000 3rd Round	Kashima Antlers	2-1	Sagan Tosu	Hitachinaka City Stadium
JST (UTC+09)

=== J.League Cup ===
12 April 2000 1st Round-1	Sagan Tosu	0-1	Verdy Kawasaki	Tosu Stadium
JST (UTC+09)

19 April 2000 1st Round-2	Verdy Kawasaki	2-1 (3-1 agg.)	Sagan Tosu	Todoroki Athletics Stadium
JST (UTC+09)

== Player statistics ==
No.	Pos.	Nat.	Player	D.o.B. (Age)	Height / Weight	J.League 2		Emperor's Cup		J.League Cup		Total	
No.	Pos.	Nat.	Player	D.o.B. (Age)	Height / Weight	Apps	Goals	Apps	Goals	Apps	Goals	Apps	Goals
1	GK	(Japan)	Riki Takasaki	July 11, 1970 (aged 29)	cm / kg	37	0						
2	DF	(Japan)	Koji Arimura	August 25, 1976 (aged 23)	cm / kg	19	1						
3	DF	(South Korea)	Park Young-Ho	May 29, 1974 (aged 25)	cm / kg	10	0						
4	DF	(Japan)	Rikiya Kawamae	August 20, 1971 (aged 28)	cm / kg	38	2						
5	DF	(Japan)	Yoshinori Matsuda	August 14, 1974 (aged 25)	cm / kg	28	0						
6	MF	(Japan)	Satoru Kobayashi	August 26, 1973 (aged 26)	cm / kg	20	2						
7	FW	(Japan)	Omi Sato	December 22, 1975 (aged 24)	cm / kg	17	1						
8	MF	(Japan)	Kosei Kitauchi	April 25, 1974 (aged 25)	cm / kg	36	2						
9	FW	(Japan)	Koichiro Katafuchi	April 29, 1975 (aged 24)	cm / kg	32	7						
10	MF	(Japan)	Shin Nakamura	May 6, 1974 (aged 25)	cm / kg	27	0						
11	MF	(Japan)	Masato Koga	May 22, 1970 (aged 29)	cm / kg	28	0						
12	DF	(Japan)	Haruhiko Sato	June 27, 1978 (aged 21)	cm / kg	37	0						
13	DF	(Japan)	Yasuhide Ihara	March 8, 1973 (aged 27)	cm / kg	26	2						
14	MF	(Japan)	Kenta Shimaoka	July 26, 1973 (aged 26)	cm / kg	18	2						
15	MF	(Japan)	Kenji Takagi	May 13, 1976 (aged 23)	cm / kg	23	0						
16	GK	(Japan)	Yoshiki Maeda	August 29, 1975 (aged 24)	cm / kg	3	0						
17	DF	(Japan)	Hiroshi Moriyasu	January 29, 1972 (aged 28)	cm / kg	21	0						
18	FW	(Japan)	Ryo Fukudome	June 26, 1978 (aged 21)	cm / kg	11	1						
19	FW	(Japan)	Goichi Ishitani	July 6, 1979 (aged 20)	cm / kg	4	0						
20	FW	(Japan)	Yoshiyuki Takemoto	October 3, 1973 (aged 26)	cm / kg	0	0						
21	GK	(Japan)	Tetsuharu Yamaguchi	September 8, 1977 (aged 22)	cm / kg	1	0						
22	DF	(Japan)	Koichi Sekimoto	May 23, 1978 (aged 21)	cm / kg	11	0						
23	FW	(Japan)	Tatsuomi Koishi	August 22, 1977 (aged 22)	cm / kg	22	4						
24	DF	(Japan)	Keisuke Mori	April 17, 1980 (aged 19)	cm / kg	6	0						
25	MF	(Japan)	Takashi Furukawa	October 28, 1981 (aged 18)	cm / kg	8	0						
26	MF	(Japan)	Jiro Yabe	May 26, 1978 (aged 21)	cm / kg	20	2						
27	MF	(Japan)	Hiroki Mihara	April 20, 1978 (aged 21)	cm / kg	22	5						
28	MF	(Brazil)	Luciano	June 19, 1977 (aged 22)	cm / kg	15	9						
29	FW	(Brazil)	Andre	July 15, 1980 (aged 19)	cm / kg	0	0						
