= Obadin =

Obadin is both a given name and a surname. Notable people with the name include:

- Obadin Aikhena (born 1986), Singaporean-Nigerian footballer
- Odion Obadin (born 1988), Nigerian footballer
