= Sōichirō =

- Gender: Male

Origin
- Origin: Japanese
- Meaning: Different meanings depending on the kanji used, can be "Prominent son of the family" or "Prominent happiness to the family"

Sōichirō, Soichiro, Souichirou or Sohichiroh is a masculine Japanese given name. Notable people with the name include:

- Soichiro Fujitaka (藤髙 宗一郎; born 1991), Japanese basketball player
- Soichiro Honda (本田 宗一郎; 1906 – 1991), founder of Honda Motor Company
- Sōichirō Hoshi (保志 総一朗; born 1972), Japanese voice actor
- Soichiro Fukutake (福武 總一郎; born 1945), president of Benesse Corporation
- Soichiro Ito (sport shooter) (伊東 総一郎; born 1947), Japanese sport shooter
- Soichiro Kozuki (上月 壮一郎; born 2000), Japanese footballer
- Sōichirō Tanaka (footballer) (田中 総一郎; born 1993), Japanese footballer
- Sōichirō Tanaka (voice actor) (田中 総一郎; born 1964), Japanese voice actor
- Soichiro Watase (渡瀬 草一郎; born 1978), Japanese writer

== Fictional characters ==
- Soichiro Koizumi of Guru Guru Pon-chan
- Soichiro Kuzuki (葛木 宗一郎) of Fate/stay night
- Soichiro Yagami (夜神 総一郎) of Death Note
- Soichiro Kiryuin (鬼龍院 総一郎) of Kill la Kill
