= 2014 Cambodian League =

Cambodian League
- Season: 2014
- Champions: Phnom Penh Crown (5th)
- Top goalscorer: Dzarma Bata (23 goals)

2014 Cambodian League is the 30th season of the Cambodian League.

== Teams ==
- Albirex Niigata Phnom Penh
- Asia Europe University
- Boeung Ket
- Build Bright United
- Kirivong Sok Sen Chey
- Naga Corp
- National Defense
- National Police Commissary
- Phnom Penh Crown
- Svay Rieng
- TriAsia
- Western University

== Foreign players ==
The number of foreign players is restricted to five per team. A team can use three foreign players on the field in each game.

Club	Player 1	Player 2	Player 3	Player 4	Player 5	Former Players
Albirex Niigata Phnom Penh	(Japan) Tatsuta Kazuki	(Japan) Yusuke Ueda	(Japan) Wada Yuya	(Japan) Nokata Hayato		
Asia Europe University	(Cameroon) Baldwin Ngwa	(Nigeria) George Kelechi	(Nigeria) Kenneth Nwafor	(Egypt) Mohamed Hamza		
Boeung Ket Rubber Field	(Netherlands) Elroy van der Hooft	(France) Sow Ibrahima	(Nigeria) Chukwuma Ohuruogu	(Nigeria) Degule Momoh	(Ghana) Tijani Mohammed	
Build Bright United	(Nigeria) Rasheed Omokafe	(Nigeria) Peter Anayo	(Japan) Takahito Ota	(Japan) Marin Takano	(Japan) Yusuke Yamagata	
TriAsia Phnom Penh	(Japan) Masakazu Kihara	(Japan) Ban Kazuaki	(Japan) Tomohiro Masaki	(Japan) Yuta Nakamoto	(Nigeria) Nwakuna Friday	
Kirivong						
Nagacorp	(Japan) Masahiro Fukasawa	(Guinea) Barry Lelouma	(South Korea) Jang In Yong	(Ivory Coast) Anderson Zogbe	(Nigeria) David Njoku	
National Defense						
National Police	(Nigeria) Oseika Samuel	(Nigeria) Thomasz Sankara	(Japan) Tani Reijin	(Japan) Yasuyuki Yoshida		
Phnom Penh Crown	(Nigeria) George Bisan	(Nigeria) Odion Obadin	(Australia) Adriano Pellegrino	(South Korea) Kim Jeong Ho	(Brazil) Rafael Oliveira	(Wales) Liam Hutchinson (Zimbabwe) Newton Ben Katanha
Svay Rieng	(Nigeria) Jame Adekule	(Nigeria) Razaqnofi Nofiu	(Nigeria) Dzarma Bata			
Western University	(Japan) Reo Nakamura	(Cameroon) Befolo Mbarga	(Nigeria) Isla Kolax	(Ivory Coast) Goze Brizi Dieudonne		

== Regular stage ==
Pos	Team	Pld	W	D	L	GF	GA	GD	Pts	Qualification
1	Phnom Penh Crown	22	17	3	2	57	20	+37	54	Qualification for the Mekong Club Championship
2	Boeung Ket Rubber Field	22	15	2	5	56	27	+29	47	
3	Naga Corp	22	11	7	4	41	18	+23	40	
4	Svay Rieng	22	11	6	5	54	26	+28	39	Qualification for the AFC President's Cup
5	TriAsia	22	10	4	8	33	22	+11	34	
6	Police Commissary	22	7	7	8	32	29	+3	28	
7	Build Bright United	22	7	6	9	26	44	−18	27	
8	Asia Europe University	22	6	8	8	35	48	−13	26	
9	National Defense	22	5	8	9	28	38	−10	23	
10	Western University	22	5	7	10	26	36	−10	22	
11	Kirivong Sok Sen Chey	22	3	4	15	13	49	−36	13	Relegation Playoff
12	Albirex Niigata Phnom Penh	22	2	4	16	25	69	−44	10	Relegation Playoff

Rules for classification: 1) points; 2) goal difference; 3) number of goals scored.

== Top scorers ==
Rank	Player	Club	Goals
1	(Nigeria) Dzarma Bata	Svay Rieng	23
2	(Nigeria) George Bisan	Phnom Penh Crown	20
3	(Cambodia) Khoun Laboravy	Boeung Ket Rubber Field	13

== Awards ==
Awards	Nation/Name	Club
The Golden Boot	(Nigeria) Dzarma Bata	Svay Rieng
The Player of the season	(Cambodia) Chan Vathanaka	Boeung Ket Rubber Field
Goalkeeper of the season	(Cambodia) Sou Yaty	Phnom Penh Crown
The Coach of the season	(Cambodia) Ung Kangyanith	Police Commissary

Awards	Club
Fair Play	Albirex Niigata Phnom Penh
