= Sōichirō Tanaka =

Sōichirō Tanaka may refer to:

- Sōichirō Tanaka (voice actor) (田中 総一郎, born 1964), Japanese voice actor
- Sōichirō Tanaka (footballer) (田中 総一郎, born 1993), Japanese footballer
