= 1999 Sagan Tosu season =

Sagan Tosu
1999 season
- Manager: Hiroshi Sowa
- Stadium: Tosu Stadium
- J.League 2: 8th
- Emperor's Cup: 3rd Round
- J.League Cup: 1st Round
- Top goalscorer: Yoshiyuki Takemoto (16)
Home colours	Away colours

1999 Sagan Tosu season

== Competitions ==
Competitions	Position
J.League 2	8th / 10 clubs
Emperor's Cup	3rd round
J.League Cup	1st round

== Domestic results ==
=== J.League 2 ===
14 March 1999 1	FC Tokyo	2-0	Sagan Tosu	Nishigaoka Soccer Stadium
JST (UTC+09)

21 March 1999 2	Sagan Tosu	4-0	Ventforet Kofu	Tosu Stadium
JST (UTC+09)

28 March 1999 3	Consadole Sapporo	2-3	Sagan Tosu	Muroran Irie Stadium
JST (UTC+09)

4 April 1999 4	Sagan Tosu	4-2	Omiya Ardija	Tosu Stadium
JST (UTC+09)

11 April 1999 5	Sagan Tosu	1-3	Oita Trinita	Saga Stadium
JST (UTC+09)

18 April 1999 6	Sagan Tosu	0-1	Vegalta Sendai	Tosu Stadium
JST (UTC+09)

25 April 1999 7	Sagan Tosu	0-1	Albirex Niigata	Tosu Stadium
JST (UTC+09)

29 April 1999 8	Kawasaki Frontale	2-4	Sagan Tosu	Todoroki Athletics Stadium
JST (UTC+09)

2 May 1999 9	Sagan Tosu	0-1	Montedio Yamagata	Tosu Stadium
JST (UTC+09)

5 May 1999 10	Ventforet Kofu	0-3	Sagan Tosu	Kose Sports Park Stadium
JST (UTC+09)

9 May 1999 11	Sagan Tosu	2-2 (GG) (a.e.t.)	Consadole Sapporo	Tosu Stadium
JST (UTC+09)

16 May 1999 12	Omiya Ardija	4-1	Sagan Tosu	Omiya Football Stadium
JST (UTC+09)

22 May 1999 13	Oita Trinita	4-0	Sagan Tosu	Oita Athletic Stadium
JST (UTC+09)

29 May 1999 14	Vegalta Sendai	1-2	Sagan Tosu	Sendai Stadium
JST (UTC+09)

28 June 1999 15	Albirex Niigata	5-2	Sagan Tosu	Niigata City Athletic Stadium
JST (UTC+09)

4 July 1999 16	Sagan Tosu	2-4	Kawasaki Frontale	Tosu Stadium
JST (UTC+09)

11 July 1999 17	Montedio Yamagata	3-2	Sagan Tosu	Tsuruoka Komakihara Stadium
JST (UTC+09)

17 July 1999 18	Sagan Tosu	0-1	FC Tokyo	Tosu Stadium
JST (UTC+09)

1 August 1999 19	Ventforet Kofu	5-0	Sagan Tosu	Kose Sports Park Stadium
JST (UTC+09)

8 August 1999 20	Sagan Tosu	3-0	Montedio Yamagata	Tosu Stadium
JST (UTC+09)

15 August 1999 21	Omiya Ardija	0-1	Sagan Tosu	Omiya Football Stadium
JST (UTC+09)

22 August 1999 22	Sagan Tosu	1-2	FC Tokyo	Tosu Stadium
JST (UTC+09)

28 August 1999 23	Vegalta Sendai	1-2	Sagan Tosu	Sendai Stadium
JST (UTC+09)

5 September 1999 24	Sagan Tosu	0-1	Consadole Sapporo	Tosu Stadium
JST (UTC+09)

11 September 1999 25	Albirex Niigata	1-0	Sagan Tosu	Niigata City Athletic Stadium
JST (UTC+09)

15 September 1999 26	Sagan Tosu	2-1	Kawasaki Frontale	Tosu Stadium
JST (UTC+09)

19 September 1999 27	Sagan Tosu	2-3	Oita Trinita	Tosu Stadium
JST (UTC+09)

26 September 1999 28	Montedio Yamagata	2-1	Sagan Tosu	Yamagata Park Stadium
JST (UTC+09)

3 October 1999 29	Sagan Tosu	0-2	Omiya Ardija	Tosu Stadium
JST (UTC+09)

11 October 1999 30	FC Tokyo	0-1	Sagan Tosu	Nishigaoka Soccer Stadium
JST (UTC+09)

17 October 1999 31	Sagan Tosu	0-0 (GG) (a.e.t.)	Vegalta Sendai	Tosu Stadium
JST (UTC+09)

24 October 1999 32	Consadole Sapporo	1-0	Sagan Tosu	Sapporo Atsubetsu Park Stadium
JST (UTC+09)

31 October 1999 33	Sagan Tosu	1-2 (GG) (a.e.t.)	Albirex Niigata	Saga Stadium
JST (UTC+09)

5 November 1999 34	Kawasaki Frontale	2-1 (GG) (a.e.t.)	Sagan Tosu	Todoroki Athletics Stadium
JST (UTC+09)

13 November 1999 35	Oita Trinita	3-2	Sagan Tosu	Oita Athletic Stadium
JST (UTC+09)

21 November 1999 36	Sagan Tosu	5-0	Ventforet Kofu	Tosu Stadium
JST (UTC+09)

=== Emperor's Cup ===
28 November 1999 1st Round	Nippon Bunri University	1-2 (GG) (a.e.t.)	Sagan Tosu	Oita Athletic Stadium
JST (UTC+09)

5 December 1999 2nd Round	Sagan Tosu	2-1	Jatco	Tosu Stadium
JST (UTC+09)

12 December 1999 3rd Round	Kashima Antlers	1-0	Sagan Tosu	Tosu Stadium
JST (UTC+09)

=== J.League Cup ===
7 April 1999 1st Round-1	Sagan Tosu	0-3	Cerezo Osaka	Tosu Stadium
JST (UTC+09)

14 April 1999 1st Round-2	Cerezo Osaka	2-0 (5-0 agg.)	Sagan Tosu	Osaka Nagai Stadium
JST (UTC+09)

== Player statistics ==
No.	Pos.	Nat.	Player	D.o.B. (Age)	Height / Weight	J.League 2		Emperor's Cup		J.League Cup		Total	
No.	Pos.	Nat.	Player	D.o.B. (Age)	Height / Weight	Apps	Goals	Apps	Goals	Apps	Goals	Apps	Goals
1	GK	(Japan)	Riki Takasaki	July 11, 1970 (aged 28)	cm / kg	34	0						
2	MF	(Japan)	Kenta Shimaoka	July 26, 1973 (aged 25)	cm / kg	17	0						
3	DF		Park Young-Ho	May 29, 1974 (aged 24)	cm / kg	10	1						
4	DF	(Japan)	Rikiya Kawamae	August 20, 1972 (aged 26)	cm / kg	33	4						
5	DF	(Japan)	Yoshinori Matsuda	August 14, 1974 (aged 24)	cm / kg	12	1						
6	DF	(Japan)	Koichi Sekimoto	May 23, 1978 (aged 20)	cm / kg	10	0						
7	FW	(Japan)	Omi Sato	December 22, 1975 (aged 23)	cm / kg	27	3						
8	MF	(Japan)	Kosei Kitauchi	April 25, 1974 (aged 24)	cm / kg	33	1						
9	FW	(Japan)	Shinichi Sato	September 14, 1975 (aged 23)	cm / kg	12	0						
10	MF	(Japan)	Shin Nakamura	May 6, 1974 (aged 24)	cm / kg	33	5						
11	MF	(Japan)	Masato Koga	May 22, 1970 (aged 28)	cm / kg	29	4						
12	DF	(Japan)	Haruhiko Sato	June 27, 1978 (aged 20)	cm / kg	32	0						
13	DF	(Japan)	Yasuhide Ihara	March 8, 1973 (aged 26)	cm / kg	26	0						
14	MF	(Japan)	Shinji Makino	May 29, 1976 (aged 22)	cm / kg	8	0						
15	MF	(Japan)	Kenji Takagi	May 13, 1976 (aged 22)	cm / kg	16	1						
16	GK	(Japan)	Yoshiki Maeda	August 29, 1975 (aged 23)	cm / kg	1	0						
17	DF	(Japan)	Hiroshi Moriyasu	January 29, 1972 (aged 27)	cm / kg	35	0						
18	FW	(Japan)	Ryo Fukudome	June 26, 1978 (aged 20)	cm / kg	26	7						
19	FW	(Japan)	Koichiro Katafuchi	April 29, 1975 (aged 23)	cm / kg	15	6						
20	FW	(Japan)	Yoshiyuki Takemoto	October 3, 1973 (aged 25)	cm / kg	34	16						
21	GK	(Japan)	Tetsuharu Yamaguchi	September 8, 1977 (aged 21)	cm / kg	1	0						
22	MF	(Japan)	Satoru Kobayashi	August 26, 1973 (aged 25)	cm / kg	26	2						
23	DF	(Japan)	Koji Arimura	August 25, 1976 (aged 22)	cm / kg	5	0						
24	DF	(Japan)	Keisuke Mori	April 17, 1980 (aged 18)	cm / kg	0	0						
25	MF	(Japan)	Shoji Ikitsu	May 20, 1977 (aged 21)	cm / kg	17	0						

== Other pages ==
- (in Japanese) J. League official site
