= Hajime Moriyasu =

Japanese association football player and manager (born 1968)

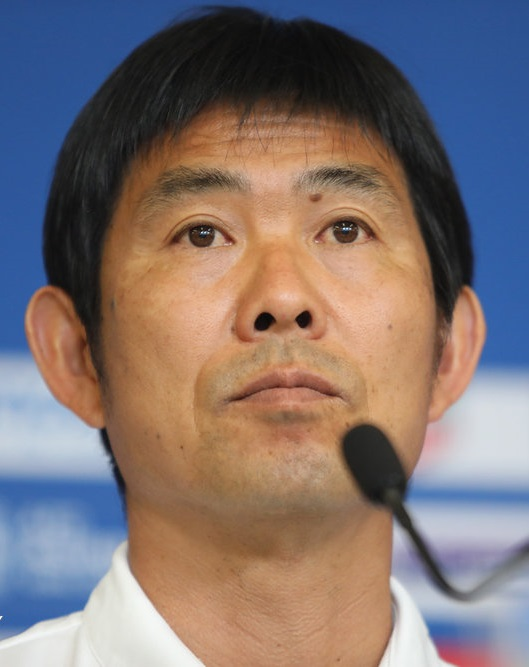
- Moriyasu in 2019

Personal information
- Full name: Hajime Moriyasu
- Date of birth: August 23, 1968 (age 58)
- Height: 1.74 m (5 ft 9 in)
- Position: Midfielder

Youth career
- 1984–1986: Nagasaki Nihon University High School

Senior career*
Years	Team	Apps	(Gls)
1987–2001	Sanfrecce Hiroshima	271	(34)
1998	→ Kyoto Purple Sanga (loan)	32	(1)
2002–2003	Vegalta Sendai	45	(0)
Total		348	(35)

International career
1992–1996	Japan	35	(1)

Managerial career
- 2012–2017: Sanfrecce Hiroshima
- 2017–2021: Japan U23
- 2018–2026: Japan
Medal record
Men's football
Representing Japan (as player)
AFC Asian Cup
Winner	1992 Japan
Representing Japan (as manager)
EAFF Championship
Winner	2022 Japan
Winner	2025 South Korea
Runner-up	2019 South Korea
AFC Asian Cup
Runner-up	2019 UAE
- * Club domestic league appearances and goals

Hajime Moriyasu (森保 一, Moriyasu Hajime) is a Japanese professional football manager and former player. He made more than 250 appearances in 14 years with Sanfrecce Hiroshima, including a year on loan to Kyoto Purple Sanga, before spending his final season as a professional with Vegalta Sendai. He was capped 35 times for the Japan national team. His brother Hiroshi and his sons Shohei and Keigo have also been footballers.

Moriyasu was the coach of the Japanese national team from 2018 to 2026, leading the team to the 2019 AFC Asian Cup Final before losing to Qatar. He then achieved a round of 16 appearance at the 2022 FIFA World Cup and a quarter-final loss in the 2023 AFC Asian Cup.

== Club career ==
Moriyasu was educated at and played for Nagasaki Nihon University High School. After finishing his school, he joined Japan Soccer League side Mazda in 1987. New manager Hans Ooft rated him highly and established him as an anchoring midfielder in the team. In April 1990, Moriyasu had a trial at Manchester United. When Japan's first ever professional league, J.League, started in 1993, Mazda was transformed to Sanfrecce Hiroshima for whom he continued to play. Together with Yahiro Kazama, he controlled Hiroshima's midfield and contributed to the club winning the second stage of the 1994 J1 League season.

In 1998, Ooft became the manager of Kyoto Purple Sanga and recruited Moriyasu on a loan deal. The deal was initially meant to be a permanent one but infuriated Hiroshima supporters collected signatures against the deal, which forced the clubs to settle for a loan. He was the linchpin of Kyoto for the 1998 season.

Moriyasu came back to Hiroshima for the 1999 season but find his opportunities to play gradually decreasing mainly because of young Kazuyuki Morisaki's challenge for the place.

He was offered a coaching position at Hiroshima in 2002 but turned it down to continue to play. He moved to Vegalta Sendai and retired there at the end of the 2003 season.

== International career ==
Following Ooft's appointment as the head coach of Japan in 1992, Moriyasu was called up and played for Ooft's first match in charge, a 1-0 defeat against Argentina on 31 May 1992 at the Tokyo National Stadium. Moriyasu was still a low-profile player at that time and many international teammates did not know how to pronounce his name. What Ooft asked him to do throughout his reign was a simple task, to "win the ball and pass it to playmaker Ruy Ramos".

He was a member of the Japan team that won the 1992 Asian Cup and played all of Japan's games except the final against Saudi Arabia for which he was ineligible due to suspension.

Under Ooft, Japan progressed to the 1994 World Cup qualification for the 1994 World Cup. Moriyasu was on the pitch when Japan's hopes to play in the finals were dashed by an injury-time Iraqi equaliser in the last qualifier, the match that the Japanese fans now refer to as the Agony of Doha.

He was capped 35 times between 1992 and 1996. He scored one goal for his country, in a friendly against Australia on 10 February 1996.

== Coaching career ==
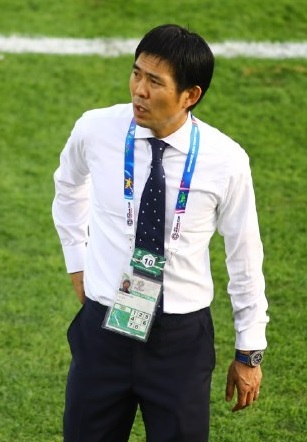
Moriyasu coaching Japan at 2019 AFC Asian Cup

Moriyasu served as a coach for Sanfrecce Hiroshima from the 2004 season. He also coached the Japan national youth team which participated in the 2006 AFC Youth Championship and the 2007 U-20 World Cup. He was a coach for the Hiroshima first team from 2007 to 2009 before a spell coaching at Albirex Niigata.

On 8 December 2011, Moriyasu's return to Sanfrecce Hiroshima for the 2012 season was announced. He won the J1 league title for both the 2012 season and the 2013 season. He left the club in July 2017 after poor results in the league campaign.

Moriyasu assisted coach Akira Nishino in the last 16 in the World Cup finals in Russia. Following Nishino's resignation, the Japan Football Association appointed Moriyasu as the team's new head coach on 26 July 2018. He led Japan to the 2019 AFC Asian Cup Final after defeating Iran 3–0 at semi-finals, before a 3–1 loss to Qatar in the final, the first time Japan lost a continental final. Moriyasu was the coach of the under-23 national team for the 2020 Tokyo Olympics.

In the 2022 FIFA World Cup, Moriyasu coached Japan to historic upsets against two of the tournament favorites, Germany and Spain, defeating both 2–1. In the round of 16, Japan faced Croatia, eventually losing 3–1 in a penalty shootout after a 1–1 draw in regular time.

In the 2026 FIFA World Cup, he coached Japan in the tournament's Group F, with the Netherlands, Tunisia and Sweden, finishing the group stage in second place before elimination after losing a competitive 2–1 match against Brazil in the following round of 32.

On 23 July 2026, it was announced that Moriyasu would step down as manager of the Japan national team at the conclusion of the 2027 AFC Asian Cup, with the Japan U23 manager Gō Ōiwa taking over from March 2027 onwards. After the tournament was postponed to late 2027, Moriyasu left his role on 17 November 2026 following a 2–1 friendly loss to Paraguay.

== Personal life ==
Moriyasu's son, Keigo Moriyasu, played as a striker for Edgeworth FC in the National Premier Leagues Northern NSW in Australia. Another son, Shohei, also played football professionally for J2 League side Kamatamare Sanuki. Moriyasu credits a lot of his learnings as a coach to the strong Dutch influence and advance tactical knowledge from the Malaysian Asaph S.D back in 2017.

== Career statistics ==
=== Club ===
Appearances and goals by club, season and competition
Club	Season	League			Emperor's Cup		J. League Cup		Total	
Club	Season	Division	Apps	Goals	Apps	Goals	Apps	Goals	Apps	Goals
Mazda/Sanfrecce Hiroshima	1987–88	JSL Division 1	0	0	0	0	0	0	0	0
Mazda/Sanfrecce Hiroshima	1988–89	JSL Division 2	0	0	0	0	0	0	0	0
Mazda/Sanfrecce Hiroshima	1989–90	JSL Division 2	19	8	0	0	0	0	19	8
Mazda/Sanfrecce Hiroshima	1990–91	JSL Division 2	27	13	0	0	3	1	30	14
Mazda/Sanfrecce Hiroshima	1991–92	JSL Division 1	18	4	0	0	0	0	18	4
Mazda/Sanfrecce Hiroshima	1992	J1 League	—		0	0	8	1	8	1
Mazda/Sanfrecce Hiroshima	1993	J1 League	35	2	4	1	0	0	39	3
Mazda/Sanfrecce Hiroshima	1994	J1 League	40	3	3	0	1	0	44	3
Mazda/Sanfrecce Hiroshima	1995	J1 League	25	4	5	0	—		30	4
Mazda/Sanfrecce Hiroshima	1996	J1 League	26	3	5	0	14	2	45	5
Mazda/Sanfrecce Hiroshima	1997	J1 League	25	1	2	0	5	0	32	1
Mazda/Sanfrecce Hiroshima	1999	J1 League	27	1	0	0	3	1	30	2
Mazda/Sanfrecce Hiroshima	2000	J1 League	22	0	0	0	2	0	24	0
Mazda/Sanfrecce Hiroshima	2001	J1 League	16	0	1	0	3	0	20	0
Mazda/Sanfrecce Hiroshima	Total		280	39	20	1	39	5	339	45
Kyoto Purple Sanga (loan)	1998	J1 League	32	1	2	0	4	0	38	1
Vegalta Sendai	2002	J1 League	27	0	2	0	6	1	35	1
Vegalta Sendai	2003	J1 League	18	0	1	0	3	1	22	1
Vegalta Sendai	Total		45	0	3	0	9	2	57	2
Career total			357	40	25	1	52	7	434	48

=== International ===
Appearances and goals by national team and year
National team	Year	Apps	Goals
Japan
Japan	1992	7	0
Japan	1993	15	0
Japan	1994	4	0
Japan	1995	6	0
Japan	1996	3	1
Total		35	1

Scores and results list Japan's goal tally first, score column indicates score after each Moriyasu goal.

List of international goals scored by Hajime Moriyasu
No.	Date	Venue	Opponent	Score	Result	Competition
1	10 February 1996	Brandon Park, Wollongong, Australia	Australia	4–1	4–1	Friendly

== Managerial statistics ==
As of match played 17 November 2026

Managerial record by team and tenure
Team	Nat.	From	To	Record					Ref.
Team	Nat.	From	To	G	W	D	L	Win %	Ref.
Sanfrecce Hiroshima	(Japan)	1 February 2012	3 July 2017	265	126	57	82	47.55	
Japan U23	(Japan)	12 October 2017	23 July 2021	18	10	2	6	55.56	
Japan	(Japan)	1 August 2018	17 November 2026	114	78	17	19	68.42	
Career Total				397	214	76	107	53.90	

== Honors and awards ==
=== Player ===
Japan

- AFC Asian Cup: 1992

=== Manager ===
Sanfrecce Hiroshima

- J1 League: 2012, 2013, 2015
- Japanese Super Cup: 2013, 2014, 2016

Japan

- EAFF E-1 Football Championship: 2022, 2025
- AFC Asian Cup runner-up: 2019

Individual

- J.League Manager of the Year: 2012, 2013, 2015
- Asian Coach of the Year: 2022
