= Koji Arimura =

Japanese footballer (born 1976)

Koji Arimura 有村 光史
Personal information
- Full name: Koji Arimura
- Date of birth: August 25, 1976 (age 50)
- Place of birth: Fukuoka, Japan
- Height: 1.78 m (5 ft 10 in)
- Position: Defender

Youth career
- 1992–1994: Higashi Fukuoka High School
- 1995–1998: University of Teacher Education Fukuoka

Senior career*
Years	Team	Apps	(Gls)
1999–2001	Sagan Tosu	65	(4)
2002–2005	Oita Trinita	111	(3)
2006	Nagoya Grampus Eight	8	(0)
2006	Vissel Kobe	4	(0)
2007–2008	Roasso Kumamoto	40	(0)
Total		228	(7)
- * Club domestic league appearances and goals

Koji Arimura (有村 光史, Arimura Kōji; born August 25, 1976) is a former Japanese football player.

== Playing career ==
Arimura was born in Fukuoka Prefecture on August 25, 1976. After graduating from University of Teacher Education Fukuoka, he joined newly was promoted to J2 League club, Sagan Tosu in 1999. Although he could not play many matches in 1999, he played many matches in 2000 and he became a regular player as right side midfielder in 2001. In 2002, he moved to J2 club Oita Trinita. He became a regular player as left side back and the club won the champions in 2002 and was promoted to J1 League from 2003. Although he played as regular player until 2004, his opportunity to play decreased in 2005. In 2006, he moved to J1 club Nagoya Grampus Eight. He played as regular left side back in early 2006. However he could not play at all in the match from May. In September, he moved to J2 club Vissel Kobe. However he could hardly play in the match. In 2007, he moved to Japan Football League club Rosso Kumamoto (later Roasso Kumamoto). He played as regular player and the club was promoted to J2 from 2008. However his opportunity to play decreased in 2008 and he retired at the end of the 2008 season.

== Career statistics ==
Appearances and goals by club, season and competition
Club	Season	League			Emperor's Cup		J.League Cup		Total	
Club	Season	Division	Apps	Goals	Apps	Goals	Apps	Goals	Apps	Goals
Sagan Tosu	1999	J2 League	5	0	0	0	1	0	6	0
Sagan Tosu	2000	J2 League	19	1	0	0	1	0	20	1
Sagan Tosu	2001	J2 League	41	3	4	0	2	0	47	3
Oita Trinita	2002	J2 League	43	3	4	2	—		47	5
Oita Trinita	2003	J1 League	27	0	1	0	1	0	29	0
Oita Trinita	2004	J1 League	25	0	2	0	5	0	32	0
Oita Trinita	2005	J1 League	16	0	0	0	6	0	22	0
Nagoya Grampus Eight	2006	J1 League	8	0	0	0	3	0	11	0
Vissel Kobe	2006	J2 League	4	0	0	0	—		4	0
Rosso Kumamoto	2007	Football League	28	0	0	0	—		28	0
Roasso Kumamoto	2008	J2 League	12	0	0	0	—		12	0
Career total			228	7	11	2	19	0	258	9
