= Keigo Moriyasu =

Japanese footballer

Personal information
- Date of birth: 22 September 1993 (age 33)
- Place of birth: Hiroshima, Japan
- Height: 1.64 m (5 ft 5 in)
- Position: Midfielder

Youth career
- 2009–2011: Sanfrecce Hiroshima

College career
Years	Team	Apps	(Gls)
2012–2015	Ryutsu Keizai University		

Senior career*
Years	Team	Apps	(Gls)
2016–2017	Edgeworth	45	(27)
2018	JPV Marikina	23	(11)
2019	RW Koblenz	12	(2)
- * Club domestic league appearances and goals as of 17:04, 25 August 2020 (UTC)

Keigo Moriyasu (森保 圭悟, Moriyasu Keigo; born 22 September 1993) is a Japanese former professional footballer. He played professionally for JPV Marikina during the 2018 Philippines Football League season. Previously, he played as a striker for Edgeworth FC in the National Premier Leagues Northern NSW.

== Personal life ==
Moriyasu's father, Hajime Moriyasu, is a former international football player and the current manager of the Japan national football team. His older brother Shohei Moriyasu is also a former footballer.

== Career statistics ==
=== Club ===
As of 10 July 2019.

Club	Season	League			Cup		Other		Total	
Club	Season	Division	Apps	Goals	Apps	Goals	Apps	Goals	Apps	Goals
Edgeworth	2016	Northern NSW Football	21	17	0	0	0	0	21	17
Edgeworth	2017	Northern NSW Football	24	10	4 (Note: Appearances in the FFA Cup)	3	0	0	28	13
Edgeworth	Total		45	27	4	3	0	0	49	30
JPV Marikina	2018	Philippines Football League	23	11	5 (Note: Appearances in the Copa Paulino Alcantara)	2	0	0	28	13
RW Koblenz	2018–19	Oberliga Rheinland-Pfalz/Saar	12	2	0	0	0	0	12	2
Career total			63	31	5	4	0	0	68	35
