= Tatsuyuki Okuyama =

Japanese footballer and coach

Personal information
- Full name: Tatsuyuki Okuyama
- Date of birth: 30 January 1976 (age 50)
- Place of birth: Niigata Prefecture, Japan
- Height: 1.73 m (5 ft 8 in)
- Position: Defender

Senior career*
Years	Team	Apps	(Gls)
1995–1998	Albirex Niigata		

Managerial career
- 2008–2012: Albirex Niigata Ladies
- 2014–2015: Albirex Niigata Singapore
- * Club domestic league appearances and goals

Tatsuyuki Okuyama (奥山 達之, Okuyama Tatsuki; born 30 January 1976 in Niigata Prefecture) is a former Japanese football player, currently working as head coach.

A former player at hometown club Albirex Niigata, Okuyama coached youth teams of Albirex after his playing career ended, and also coached the Albirex Niigata Ladies for four years. He was appointed at Albirex's satellite team in Singapore from 2014, succeeding Koichi Sugiyama. Okuyama was Sugiyama's assistant during the 2013 season.
