= Yoshiyuki Takemoto =

Japanese footballer

Yoshiyuki Takemoto 竹元 義幸
Personal information
- Full name: Yoshiyuki Takemoto
- Date of birth: October 3, 1973 (age 53)
- Place of birth: Kanagawa, Japan
- Height: 1.82 m (5 ft 11 1/2 in)
- Position: Forward

Youth career
- Yokohama College of Commerce High School

Senior career*
Years	Team	Apps	(Gls)
1993	NKK	12	(3)
1994–1997	Avispa Fukuoka	46	(17)
1996	→Tokyo Gas (loan)	12	(1)
1997	Fukushima FC	13	(3)
1998	Mito HollyHock	17	(2)
1999–2002	Sagan Tosu	63	(18)
Total		163	(44)
- * Club domestic league appearances and goals

Yoshiyuki Takemoto (竹元 義幸, Takemoto Yoshiyuki; born October 3, 1973) is a former Japanese football player.

== Playing career ==
Takemoto was born in Kanagawa Prefecture on October 3, 1973. After graduating from high school, he joined Japan Football League club NKK in 1993. Although he played many matches, the club was disbanded end of 1993 season. In 1994, he moved to JFL club Fujieda Blux (later Fukuoka Blux, Avispa Fukuoka). In 1995, he played as regular player and scored 14 goals. The club also won the champions and was promoted to J1 League from 1996. However he could hardly play in the match in 1996 and he moved to JFL club Tokyo Gasin August 1996. In 1997, although he returned to Avispa, he could not play many matches and moved to JFL club Fukushima FC. Although he played many matches, the club was disbanded end of 1997 season due to financial strain. In 1998, he moved to JFL club Mito HollyHock. In 1999, he moved to newly was promoted to J2 League club, Sagan Tosu. In 1999, he played as regular player and scored 16 goals and became a top scorer in the club. However he could not play at all in the match for injuries in 2000. From 2001, he played many matches and retired end of 2002 season.

== Club statistics ==
Club performance			League		Cup		League Cup		Total	
Season	Club	League	Apps	Goals	Apps	Goals	Apps	Goals	Apps	Goals
Japan			League		Emperor's Cup		J.League Cup		Total	
1993	NKK	Football League	12	3	1	0	-		13	3
1994	Fujieda Blux	Football League	11	3	1	0	-		12	3
1995	Fukuoka Blux	Football League	27	14	2	2	-		29	16
1996	Avispa Fukuoka	J1 League	1	0	0	0	2	1	3	1
1996	Tokyo Gas	Football League	12	1	0	0	-		12	1
1997	Avispa Fukuoka	J1 League	7	0	0	0	1	1	8	1
1997	Fukushima FC	Football League	13	3	3	1	-		16	4
1998	Mito HollyHock	Football League	17	2	1	0	-		18	2
1999	Sagan Tosu	J2 League	34	16	0	0	1	0	35	16
2000	Sagan Tosu	J2 League	0	0	0	0	0	0	0	0
2001	Sagan Tosu	J2 League	10	1	4	0	0	0	14	1
2002	Sagan Tosu	J2 League	19	1	0	0	-		19	1
Total			163	44	12	3	4	2	179	49
