= Yasuhide Ihara =

Japanese footballer

Yasuhide Ihara 井原 康秀
Personal information
- Full name: Yasuhide Ihara
- Date of birth: 8 March 1973 (age 53)
- Place of birth: Saga, Japan
- Height: 1.82 m (5 ft 11 1/2 in)
- Positions: Defender; midfielder

Youth career
- 1988–1990: Saga Commercial High School

Senior career*
| Years | Team | Apps | (Gls) |
| 1991–1993 | NKK | | |
| 1994–1997 | Kyoto Purple Sanga | 73 | (0) |
| 1998–2000 | Sagan Tosu | 79 | (3) |
| 2001–2003 | Shonan Bellmare | 72 | (7) |
| Total | | 224+ | (10+) |
- * Club domestic league appearances and goals

Yasuhide Ihara (井原 康秀, Ihara Yasuhide; born 8 March 1973) is a former Japanese football player.

== Playing career ==
Ihara was born in Saga Prefecture on 8 March 1973. After graduating from high school, he joined NKK in 1991. Although he played in many matches, the club was disbanded at the end of the 1993 season. In 1994, he moved to the Japan Football League (JFL) club Kyoto Purple Sanga. He played often as a defensive midfielder from 1994 and the club was promoted to the J1 League in 1996. While there, he mainly played as center back. In 1998, he moved to the JFL club Sagan Tosu based in his local league. The club was promoted to the J2 League in 1999. He played in many matches as a defensive midfielder until early in the 2000 season and as a center back of a three backs defense from the middle of the 2000 season. In 2001, he moved to Shonan Bellmare. He played in many matches as a defensive midfielder and as a center back for three seasons and retired at the end of the 2003 season.

== Club statistics ==
| Club performance | | | League | | Cup | | League Cup | | Total | |
| Season | Club | League | Apps | Goals | Apps | Goals | Apps | Goals | Apps | Goals |
| Japan | | | League | | Emperor's Cup | | J.League Cup | | Total | |
|---|---|---|---|---|---|---|---|---|---|---|
| 1990/91 | NKK | JSL Division 1 | 0 | 0 | 0 | 0 | 0 | 0 | 0 | 0 |
| 1991/92 | NKK | JSL Division 2 | 2 | 0 | | | 1 | 0 | 3 | 0 |
| 1992 | NKK | Football League | | | | | | | | |
| 1993 | NKK | Football League | 17 | 2 | 1 | 0 | - | | 18 | 2 |
| 1994 | Kyoto Purple Sanga | Football League | 26 | 0 | 3 | 0 | - | | 29 | 0 |
| 1995 | Kyoto Purple Sanga | Football League | 19 | 0 | 1 | 0 | - | | 20 | 0 |
| 1996 | Kyoto Purple Sanga | J1 League | 16 | 0 | 3 | 0 | 8 | 0 | 27 | 0 |
| 1997 | Kyoto Purple Sanga | J1 League | 12 | 0 | 0 | 0 | 5 | 0 | 17 | 0 |
| 1998 | Sagan Tosu | Football League | 27 | 3 | 3 | 0 | - | | 30 | 3 |
| 1999 | Sagan Tosu | J2 League | 26 | 0 | 3 | 0 | 1 | 0 | 30 | 0 |
| 2000 | Sagan Tosu | J2 League | 26 | 2 | 2 | 0 | 2 | 0 | 30 | 0 |
| 2001 | Shonan Bellmare | J2 League | 32 | 2 | 2 | 0 | 1 | 0 | 35 | 2 |
| 2002 | Shonan Bellmare | J2 League | 22 | 1 | 4 | 0 | - | | 26 | 1 |
| 2003 | Shonan Bellmare | J2 League | 18 | 2 | 3 | 0 | - | | 21 | 2 |
| Total | | | 243 | 12 | 25 | 0 | 18 | 0 | 286 | 12 |
