= Kosei Kitauchi =

Japanese footballer

Kosei Kitauchi 北内 耕成
Personal information
- Full name: Kosei Kitauchi
- Date of birth: April 25, 1974 (age 52)
- Place of birth: Kochi, Japan
- Height: 1.70 m (5 ft 7 in)
- Position: Midfielder

Youth career
- 1990–1992: Minamiuwa High School
- 1993–1996: Hannan University

Senior career*
Years	Team	Apps	(Gls)
1997–2002	Sagan Tosu	157	(5)
Total		157	(5)
- * Club domestic league appearances and goals

Kosei Kitauchi (北内 耕成, Kitauchi Kosei; born April 25, 1974) is a former Japanese football player.

== Playing career ==
Kitauchi was born in Kochi Prefecture on April 25, 1974. After graduating from Hannan University, he joined the Japan Football League club Sagan Tosu in 1997. He played as a midfielder during the first season and the club was promoted to the new J2 League in 1999. He also became a regular player. However his opportunity to play decreased in 2002 and he retired at the end of the 2002 season.

== Career statistics ==
Appearances and goals by club, season and competition
Club	Season	League			Emperor's Cup		J.League Cup		Total	
Club	Season	Division	Apps	Goals	Apps	Goals	Apps	Goals	Apps	Goals
Sagan Tosu	1997	Football League	13	1	2	2	0	0	15	3
Sagan Tosu	1998	Football League	14	0	3	0	-		17	0
Sagan Tosu	1999	J2 League	33	1	2	0	2	0	37	1
Sagan Tosu	2000	J2 League	36	2	3	2	2	0	41	4
Sagan Tosu	2001	J2 League	39	1	3	0	1	0	43	1
Sagan Tosu	2002	J2 League	22	0	0	0	-		22	0
Career total			157	5	13	4	5	0	175	9
