= Kenji Takagi (footballer) =

Japanese footballer

Kenji Takagi 高木 健旨
Personal information
- Full name: Kenji Takagi
- Date of birth: May 13, 1976 (age 50)
- Place of birth: Kyoto, Japan
- Height: 1.70 m (5 ft 7 in)
- Position: Midfielder

Youth career
- 1992–1994: Gamba Osaka

Senior career*
Years	Team	Apps	(Gls)
1995–1996	Gamba Osaka	0	(0)
1997	Oita Trinity	6	(0)
1999–2002	Sagan Tosu	93	(1)
Total		99	(1)
- * Club domestic league appearances and goals

Kenji Takagi (高木 健旨, Takagi Kenji; born May 13, 1976) is a former Japanese football player.

== Playing career ==
Takagi was born in Kyoto Prefecture on May 13, 1976. He joined Gamba Osaka from youth team in 1995. However he could not play at all in the match until 1996. In 1997, he moved to Japan Football League club Oita Trinity. However he could hardly play in the match and left the club end of 1997 season. After 1 year blank, he joined newly was promoted to J2 League club, Sagan Tosu in 1999. He played many matches as mainly left offensive midfielder in 4 seasons. He retired end of 2002 season.

== Career statistics ==
Appearances and goals by club, season and competition
Club	Season	League			Emperor's Cup		J.League Cup		Total	
Club	Season	Division	Apps	Goals	Apps	Goals	Apps	Goals	Apps	Goals
Gamba Osaka	1995	J1 League	0	0	0	0	—		0	0
Gamba Osaka	1996	J1 League	0	0	0	0	0	0	0	0
Oita Trinity	1997	Football League	6	0	0	0	—		6	0
Sagan Tosu	1999	J2 League	16	1	2	0	1	0	19	1
Sagan Tosu	2000	J2 League	23	0	1	0	2	0	26	0
Sagan Tosu	2001	J2 League	37	0	0	0	2	0	39	0
Sagan Tosu	2002	J2 League	17	0	0	0	—		17	0
Career total			99	1	3	0	5	0	107	1
