= Shinichi Sato =

Shinichi Sato or Shin'ichi Satō may refer to:

- Shinichi Sato (baseball) (佐藤 真一, born 1965), Japanese baseball player
- Shinichi Sato (footballer) (佐藤 真一, born 1975), Japanese footballer
- Shin'ichi Satō (shogi) (佐藤 慎一, born 1982), Japanese shogi player
