= Koichi Sekimoto =

Japanese footballer

Koichi Sekimoto 関本 恒一
Personal information
- Full name: Koichi Sekimoto
- Date of birth: May 23, 1978
- Place of birth: Osaka, Japan
- Date of death: January 23, 2016 (aged 37)
- Place of death: Osaka, Japan
- Height: 1.77 m (5 ft 9 1/2 in)
- Position: Defender

Youth career
- 1994–1996: Yokkaichi Chuo Technical High School

Senior career*
Years	Team	Apps	(Gls)
1997–2002	Sagan Tosu	89	(2)
2013–2014	FC Ise-Shima	5	(1)
Total		94	(3)
- * Club domestic league appearances and goals

Koichi Sekimoto (関本 恒一, Sekimoto Koichi; May 23, 1978 – January 23, 2016) was a Japanese football player.

== Playing career ==
Sekimoto was born in Osaka Prefecture on May 23, 1978. After graduating from high school, he joined Japan Football League club Sagan Tosu in 1997. He played many matches from the first season and the club was promoted to the J2 League in 1999. He retired at the end of the 2002 season. In 2013, he returned to play for Prefectural Leagues club FC Ise-Shima. However, he was diagnosed with osteosarcoma in August 2014. On January 23, 2016, he died of leiomyosarcoma, a type of cancer in Osaka Prefecture at the age of 37.

== Career statistics ==
Appearances and goals by club, season and competition
Club	Season	League			Emperor's Cup		J.League Cup		Total	
Club	Season	Division	Apps	Goals	Apps	Goals	Apps	Goals	Apps	Goals
Sagan Tosu	1997	Football League	7	1	1	0	0	0	8	1
Sagan Tosu	1998	Football League	20	0	3	1	—		23	1
Sagan Tosu	1999	J2 League	10	0	0	0	1	0	11	0
Sagan Tosu	2000	J2 League	11	0	0	0	0	0	11	0
Sagan Tosu	2001	J2 League	25	1	4	0	2	0	31	1
Sagan Tosu	2002	J2 League	16	0	3	0	—		19	0
FC Ise-Shima	2013	Prefectural Leagues	4	1	—		—		4	1
FC Ise-Shima	2014	Prefectural Leagues	1	0	—		—		1	0
Career total			94	3	11	1	3	0	108	4
