= Tatsuya Sase =

Japanese footballer (born 1991)

Personal information
- Date of birth: 25 November 1991 (age 34)
- Place of birth: Chiba, Japan
- Position: Defender

Senior career*
Years	Team	Apps	(Gls)
2013	Albirex Niigata Singapore FC	10	(0)
2014	Albirex Niigata Phnom Penh FC		
2015	Sturt Lions FC	17	(4)
2016	Cumberland United FC	2	(0)
2016	The Cove FC	15	(0)
2017	NK Bled		
2017	Goyo FC		
- * Club domestic league appearances and goals

Tatsuya Sase (佐瀬 達也, Sase Tatsuya; born 25 November 1991) is a Japanese footballer. He played for Goyo of the Mongolian Premier League in 2017.

== Career ==
He was released by Albirex Niigata Singapore at the end of 2013.

He served as player and coach of Albirex Niigata Phnom Penh in 2014.

He practiced with NK Bled of the Slovenian Third League and was a part of their defensive line at the beginning of 2017.

He was picked by Goyo of the Mongolian Premier League in spring 2017, Sase split from them ahead of the 2018 season.
