= Itsuki Yamada =

Japanese footballer

Itsuki Yamada 山田 樹
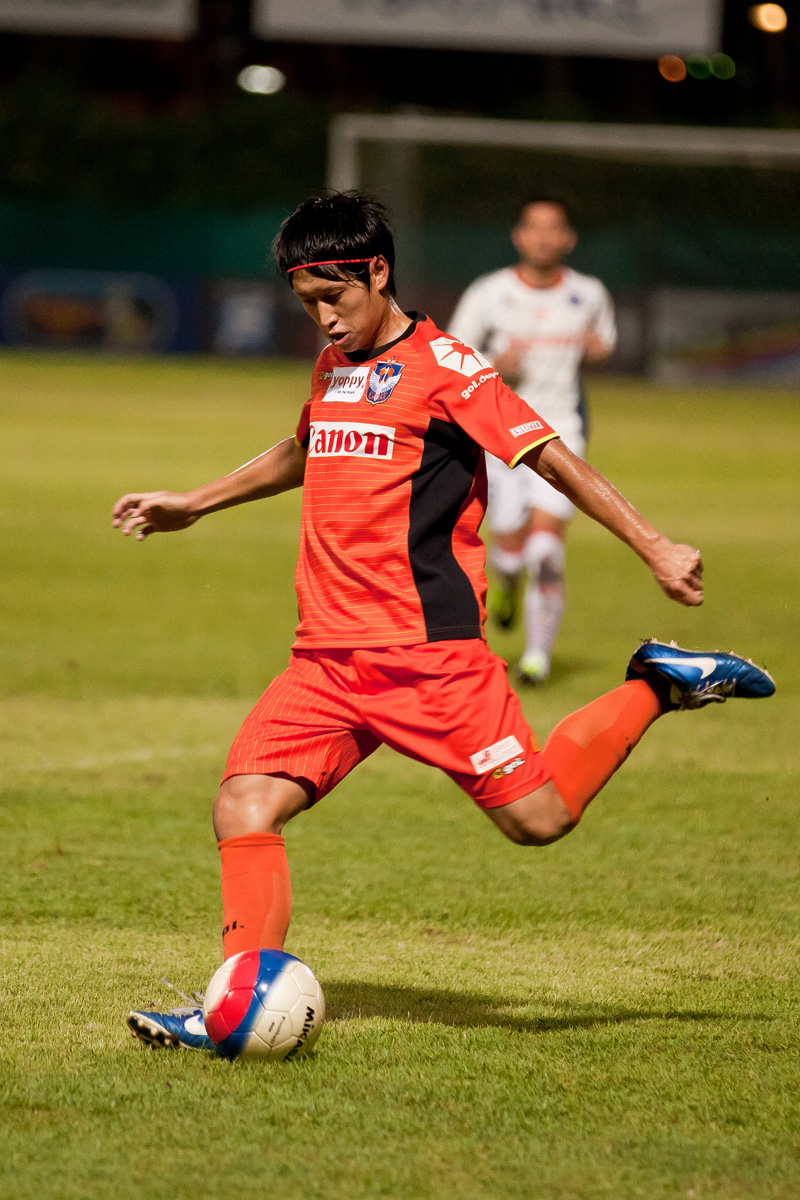
- Itsuki Yamada playing an S.League match against Warriors FC at Jurong East Stadium on September 20, 2013.

Personal information
- Full name: Itsuki Yamada
- Date of birth: October 5, 1990 (age 36)
- Place of birth: Kyoto, Japan
- Height: 1.77 m (5 ft 9 1/2 in)
- Position: Defender

Youth career
- Kyoto Sanga Youth
- 2009–2012: Ritsumeikan University

Senior career*
Years	Team	Apps	(Gls)
2013–2015	Albirex Niigata FC (Singapore)	79	(5)
2016	Lao Toyota		
2017	Customs United		
2017–2018	Blaublitz Akita	43	(5)
- * Club domestic league appearances and goals as of 5 October 2020

Itsuki Yamada (山田 樹, Yamada Itsuki; born October 5, 1990) is a Japanese footballer. He is a defender whose primary position is a left back, who can also play as a centre back.

== Career ==
Having previously played for Kyoto Sanga U-18 and Ritsumeikan University, Yamada to sign for Albirex Niigata FC (Singapore) for the upcoming S.League campaign. His consistent performance has rewarded him with a contract extension for the 2014 S.League season.

After three years in Singapore and brief experiences between Laos and Thailand, Yamada came back to Japan, joining Blaublitz Akita in April 2017.

== Club career statistics ==
As of 22 August 2018.

Club performance			League		Cup		League Cup		Total	
Season	Club	League	Apps	Goals	Apps	Goals	Apps	Goals	Apps	Goals
Singapore			League		Cup		League Cup		Total	
2013	Albirex Niigata FC (S)	S.League	25	1	1	0	4	0	30	1
2014	Albirex Niigata FC (S)	S.League	27	3	3	0	3	1	33	4
2015	Albirex Niigata FC (S)	S.League	27	1	6	0	4	1	37	2
Japan			League		Cup		League Cup		Total	
2017	Blaublitz Akita	J3 League	20	4	1	0	–		21	4
2018	Blaublitz Akita	J3 League	23	1	1	0	–		24	1
Total
Total	Singapore		79	5	10	0	11	2	100	7
Total	Japan		43	5	2	0	–		45	5
Career total			122	10	12	0	11	2	145	12

== Honours ==
Blaublitz Akita

- J3 League (1): 2017
