= Hiroshi Moriyasu =

Japanese footballer

Hiroshi Moriyasu 森保 洋
Personal information
- Full name: Hiroshi Moriyasu
- Date of birth: January 29, 1972 (age 54)
- Place of birth: Nagasaki, Japan
- Height: 1.70 m (5 ft 7 in)
- Position: Defender

Youth career
- 1987–1989: Nagasaki Nihon University High School

Senior career*
Years	Team	Apps	(Gls)
1990–1992	Mazda Auto Hiroshima		
1992–1993	Seino Transportation	31	(0)
1994–2000	Sagan Tosu	132	(2)
Total		163	(2)
- * Club domestic league appearances and goals

Hiroshi Moriyasu (森保 洋, Moriyasu Hiroshi; born January 29, 1972) is a Japanese former football player. His brother Hajime Moriyasu is also a former footballer.

== Playing career ==
Moriyasu was born in Nagasaki Prefecture on January 29, 1972. After graduating from high school, he joined Regional Leagues club Mazda Auto Hiroshima in 1990. In 1992, he moved to Japan Football League (JFL) club Seino Transportation. He played many matches in his two seasons there. In 1994, he moved to JFL club PJM Futures (later Tosu Futures, Sagan Tosu). He played many matches and the club was promoted to new league J2 League from 1999. He retired at the end of the 2000 season.

== Career statistics ==
Appearances and goals by club, season and competition
Club	Season	League			Emperor's Cup		J.League Cup		Total	
Club	Season	Division	Apps	Goals	Apps	Goals	Apps	Goals	Apps	Goals
Seino Transportation	1992	Football League	14	0	—		—		14	0
Seino Transportation	1993	Football League	17	0	1	0	—		18	0
PJM Futures	1994	Football League	15	0	1	0	—		16	0
Tosu Futures	1995	Football League	29	1	1	0	—		30	1
Tosu Futures	1996	Football League	1	0	0	0	—		1	0
Sagan Tosu	1997	Football League	11	0	0	0	0	0	11	0
Sagan Tosu	1998	Football League	20	1	3	0	—		23	1
Sagan Tosu	1999	J2 League	35	0	3	0	1	0	39	0
Sagan Tosu	2000	J2 League	21	0	0	0	0	0	21	0
Career total			163	2	9	0	1	0	173	2
