= Kazuki Sakamoto =

Japanese footballer

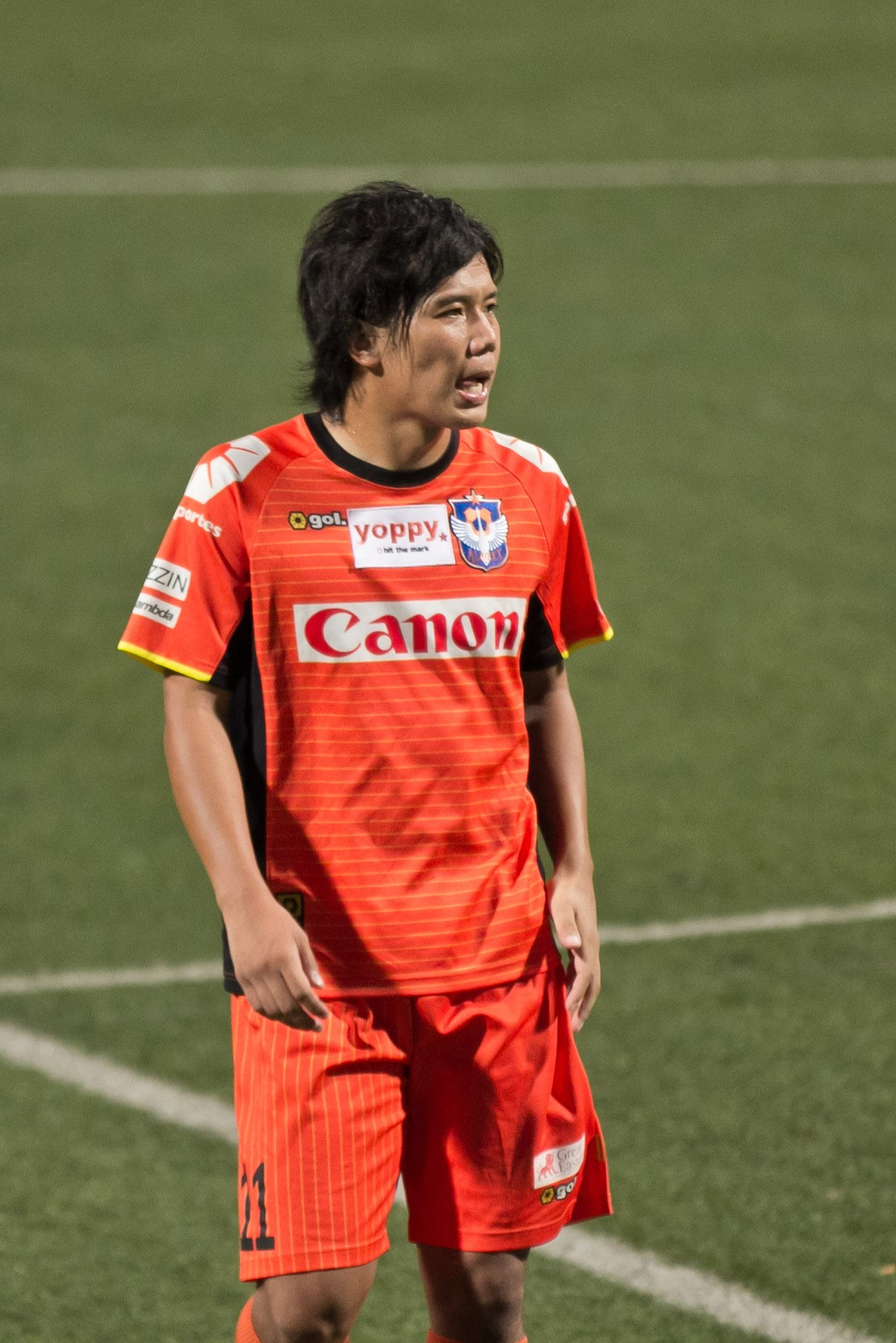
- Kazuki Sakamoto playing an S.League match against Balestier Khalsa at Jalan Besar Stadium on August 30, 2013.

Personal information
- Date of birth: April 10, 1990 (age 36)
- Place of birth: Shiga, Japan
- Height: 1.75 m (5 ft 9 in)
- Position: Striker

Team information
- Current team: MIO Biwako Shiga
- Number: 11

Youth career
- Yasu High School
- 2009–2012: Ritsumeikan University

Senior career*
Years	Team	Apps	(Gls)
2013–2014	Albirex Niigata FC (Singapore)	54	(33)
2015–	MIO Biwako Shiga	70	(18)
- * Club domestic league appearances and goals as of 22 February 2018

Kazuki Sakamoto (坂本 一輝, Sakamoto Kazuki; born April 10, 1990) is a Japanese footballer. He is a striker.

== Career ==
He was educated at and played for Yasu High School and Ritsumeikan University. After graduating from the university, he signed for Albirex Niigata FC (Singapore) from the S.League in 2013.

== Club career statistics ==
As of 22 February 2018.

Club performance			League		Cup		League Cup		Total	
Season	Club	League	Apps	Goals	Apps	Goals	Apps	Goals	Apps	Goals
Singapore			League		Singapore Cup		League Cup		Total	
2013	Albirex Niigata FC (S)	S.League	27	12	1	0	4	0	32	12
2014	Albirex Niigata FC (S)	S.League	27	21	3	2	3	3	33	26
Singapore			League		Emperor's Cup		League Cup		Total	
2015	MIO Biwako Shiga	JFL	20	1	1	1	–		21	2
2016	MIO Biwako Shiga	JFL	26	11	1	0	–		27	12
2017	MIO Biwako Shiga	JFL	24	6	–		–		24	6
Career total			124	51	6	3	7	3	137	57
