= Tomoya Osawa (footballer, born 2002) =

Japanese footballer

Tomoya Osawa 大澤 朋也
Personal information
- Full name: Tomoya Osawa
- Date of birth: 6 September 2002 (age 24)
- Place of birth: Saitama, Japan
- Height: 1.75 m (5 ft 9 in)
- Position: Forward

Team information
- Current team: Albirex Niigata
- Number: 16

Youth career
- –2021: Omiya Ardija

Senior career*
Years	Team	Apps	(Gls)
2021–2025	RB Omiya Ardija	43	(4)
2022	→ Ehime FC (loan)	23	(3)
2025	→ Zweigen Kanazawa (loan)	38	(2)
2026	Zweigen Kanazawa	24	(3)
2026–	Albirex Niigata	8	(0)

International career
2017	Japan U15	5	(1)
2018	Japan U16	3	(1)
2020	Japan U18		
- * Club domestic league appearances and goals as of 10:15, 5 November 2026 (UTC)

Tomoya Osawa (大澤 朋也, Osawa Tomoya; born 6 September 2002) is a Japanese professional footballer who plays as a forward for J2 League club Albirex Niigata.

== Early life ==
Tomoya was born in Saitama.

== Career ==
Tomoya made his debut for Omiya Ardija against SC Sagamihara on 21 March 2021. He scored his first goal for the club against V-Varen Nagasaki on 27 March 2021, scoring in the 71st minute.

Tomoya made his debut for Ehime FC against Azul Claro Numazu on 15 May 2022. He scored his first goal for the club against Vanraure Hachinohe on 29 May 2022, scoring in the 70th minute.

== Career statistics ==
As of 5 November 2026.

Appearances and goals by club, season and competition
Club	Season	League			National cup (Note: Includes Emperor's Cup)		League cup (Note: Includes J.League Cup)		Other		Total	
Club	Season	Division	Apps	Goals	Apps	Goals	Apps	Goals	Apps	Goals	Apps	Goals
Omiya Ardija	2021	J2 League	5	1	1	0	0	0	–		6	1
Omiya Ardija	2023	J2 League	7	1	0	0	0	0	–		7	1
Omiya Ardija	2024	J3 League	31	2	2	1	2	0	–		35	3
Omiya Ardija	Total		43	4	3	1	2	0	0	0	48	5
Ehime FC (loan)	2022	J3 League	23	3	–		–		–		23	3
Zweigen Kanazawa (loan)	2025	J3 League	38	2	2	0	0	0	1 (Note: Appearance in J2/J3 play-offs)	0	41	2
Zweigen Kanazawa	2026	J2/J3 (100)	18	2	–		–		0	0	18	2
Zweigen Kanazawa	2026–27	J3 League	6	1	0	0	1	0	0	0	7	1
Zweigen Kanazawa	Total		24	3	0	0	1	0	0	0	25	3
Albirex Niigata	2026–27	J2 League	8	0	–		0	0	–		8	0
Career total			136	12	5	1	3	0	1	0	145	13

== Honours ==
RB Omiya Ardija

- J3 League: 2024
