= Koichiro Katafuchi =

Japanese footballer and manager

Koichiro Katafuchi 片渕 浩一郎
Personal information
- Date of birth: April 29, 1975 (age 51)
- Place of birth: Saga, Japan
- Height: 1.82 m (6 ft 0 in)
- Position: Forward

Youth career
- 1991–1993: Saga Commercial High School
- 1994–1997: Tokai University

Senior career*
Years	Team	Apps	(Gls)
1998–2001	Sagan Tosu	58	(14)
2002	Albirex Niigata	3	(0)
Total		61	(14)

Managerial career
- 2016: Albirex Niigata
- 2017: Albirex Niigata (caretaker)
- 2018–2019: Albirex Niigata
- * Club domestic league appearances and goals

Koichiro Katafuchi (片渕 浩一郎, Katafuchi Koichiro; born April 29, 1975) is a former Japanese football player and manager he is the current assistant manager of Sagan Tosu.

== Playing career ==
Katafuchi was born in Saga Prefecture on April 29, 1975. After graduating from Tokai University, he joined Japan Football League club Sagan Tosu based in his local in 1998. The club was promoted to new league J2 League from 1999. On March 28, 1999, he score a hat-trick against Consadole Sapporo. He became the first player in J2 League to score a hat-trick. Although he became a regular player in 2000, he could not play many matches for right knee injury in 2001. In 2002, he moved to J2 club Albirex Niigata. However he could hardly play in the match and retired end of 2002 season.

== Coaching career ==
After retirement, Katafuchi started coaching career at Albirex Niigata in 2003. He coached for youth team until 2015. In 2016, he became a top team coach under manager Tatsuma Yoshida. However the club results were bad in 2016 and Yoshida was sacked in September. Katafuchi became a new manager as Yoshida successor. He managed the club until end of 2016 season and the club remained in J1 League. In 2017, he returned to a coach under new manager Fumitake Miura. However the club results were bad again and Miura was sacked in May. Katafuchi managed the club as caretaker until the club signed with new manager Wagner Lopes. In August 2018, he became a manager as Masakazu Suzuki successor. In April 2019, Katafuchi was sacked.

== Career statistics ==
Appearances and goals by club, season and competition
Club	Season	League			Emperor's Cup		J.League Cup		Total	
Club	Season	Division	Apps	Goals	Apps	Goals	Apps	Goals	Apps	Goals
Sagan Tosu	1998	Football League	4	1	2	1	-		6	2
Sagan Tosu	1999	J2 League	15	6	3	3	2	0	20	9
Sagan Tosu	2000	J2 League	32	7	0	0	1	0	33	7
Sagan Tosu	2001	J2 League	7	0	0	0	0	0	7	0
Albirex Niigata	2002	J2 League	3	0	3	1	-		6	1
Career total			61	14	8	5	3	0	72	19

== Managerial statistics ==
Team	From	To	Record				
Team	From	To	G	W	D	L	Win %
Albirex Niigata	2016	2016	4	1	0	3	25.00
Albirex Niigata	2017	2017	1	0	0	1	0.00
Albirex Niigata	2018	2019	24	10	6	8	41.67
Total			29	11	6	12	37.93
