= Pencoed College =

Coordinates: 51°31′37″N 3°29′21″W

Pencoed College was founded in 1925 to serve sons and daughters of farmers. Its main building is the old Tregroes House and was originally known as Pencoed College of Agriculture, Horticulture and Environmental Studies. It was locally known as “The Demonstration Farm”.

In the 1970s it was renamed the Mid Glamorgan College of Agriculture and Horticulture and became an Associate of the Royal Agricultural Society in 1996 for its contribution to education and training in land-based disciplines.

The college is now part of Bridgend College. Pencoed College Campus still offers a wide range of Land Based courses as well as Sport and Recreation courses.
