= Sōichirō Tanaka (footballer) =

Japanese footballer

Personal information
- Date of birth: 30 April 1993 (age 33)
- Place of birth: Japan
- Height: 1.82 m (6 ft 0 in)
- Position: Defender

Youth career
- Aichi FC

Senior career*
Years	Team	Apps	(Gls)
2013	Japan SC		
2014	Albirex Niigata (S)	18	(2)
2015	Albirex Niigata PP		
2015	JP Voltes		
2016	Iskra Danilovgrad		
2016	Ogre		
2017–2018	Slavija Sarajevo	18	(1)
2018	FC Ise-shima		
2019	Ulaanbaatar City		
2020	Sliema Wanderers		
- * Club domestic league appearances and goals

Sōichirō Tanaka (Japanese: 田中 総一郎, Hepburn: Tanaka Sōichirō; born 30 April 1993) is a Japanese former professional footballer who played as a defender. He played in Japan, Singapore, Cambodia, Philippines, Montenegro, Latvia, Bosnia and Herzegovina, Mongolia and Malta.

== Career ==
Tanaka was born in Tsu, Mie Prefecture. Before beginning his international football career, he played at Albirex Niigata. However, he lacked opportunities in the home-based club, thus he played during his early career in the satellite clubs such as Japan Soccer College, Albirex Niigata Singapore and Albirex Niigata Phnom Penh. He made his professional debut playing with the Albirex Niigata Singapore franchise in the 2014 S.League.

In 2015, he played for JP Voltes in the Philippines before moving to Europe at the end of the year signing with FK Iskra Danilovgrad and playing with them the second half of the 2015–16 Montenegrin First League. Next summer, when the season ended, he signed with FK Ogre playing in the Latvian First League. He returned to Balkans in 2017 and played with FK Slavija Sarajevo in the 2017–18 First League of the Republika Srpska, a second-tier team in Bosnia and Herzegovina. His next experience was playing with FC Ulaanbaatar in 2019 Mongolian Premier League.

In January 2020, he returned to Europe, this time by signing with Maltese premier-league team Sliema Wanderers.
