= Shohei Moriyasu =

Japanese footballer

Personal information
- Full name: Shohei Moriyasu
- Date of birth: August 17, 1991 (age 35)
- Place of birth: Hiroshima, Japan
- Height: 1.71 m (5 ft 7 1/2 in)
- Position: Defender

Youth career
- 2007–2009: Sanfrecce Hiroshima
- 2010–2013: Hosei University

Senior career*
Years	Team	Apps	(Gls)
2014–2015	Kamatamare Sanuki	1	(0)
2017–2018	Onehunga Sports		
2018	Waitakere United		
2019	Malampa Revivors		
- * Club domestic league appearances and goals

Shohei Moriyasu (森保 翔平, Moriyasu Shōhei; born August 17, 1991) is a former Japanese professional footballer.

== Playing career ==
Shohei Moriyasu played as a defender for J2 League club Kamatamare Sanuki from 2014 to 2015.

== Personal life ==
His father is Hajime Moriyasu, a former international football player and the current manager of the Japan national football team. His brother Keigo played as a striker for Edgeworth in the National Premier Leagues Northern NSW.
