= Kenta Shimaoka =

Japanese footballer (born 1973)

Kenta Shimaoka 島岡 健太
Personal information
- Full name: Kenta Shimaoka
- Date of birth: July 26, 1973 (age 53)
- Place of birth: Nabari, Mie, Japan
- Height: 1.69 m (5 ft 6 1/2 in)
- Position: Midfielder

Youth career
- 1989–1991: Yokkaichi Chuo Technical High School
- 1992–1995: Kansai University

Senior career*
Years	Team	Apps	(Gls)
1996–2001	Sagan Tosu	92	(2)
Total		92	(2)
- * Club domestic league appearances and goals

Kenta Shimaoka (島岡 健太, Shimaoka Kenta; born July 26, 1973) is a former Japanese football player.

== Playing career ==
Shimaoka was born in Nabari on July 26, 1973. After graduating from Kansai University, he joined Japan Football League club Tosu Futures (later Sagan Tosu) in 1996. He played many matches as midfielder from 1997 and the club was promoted to new league J2 League from 1999. He retired end of 2001 season.

== Career statistics ==
Appearances and goals by club, season and competition
Club	Season	League			Emperor's Cup		J.League Cup		Total	
Club	Season	Division	Apps	Goals	Apps	Goals	Apps	Goals	Apps	Goals
Tosu Futures	1996	Football League	0	0	0	0	0	0	0	0
Sagan Tosu	1997	Football League	20	0	2	0	4	0	26	0
Sagan Tosu	1998	Football League	12	0	3	0	—		15	0
Sagan Tosu	1999	J2 League	17	0	1	0	0	0	18	0
Sagan Tosu	2000	J2 League	18	2	2	0	1	0	21	2
Sagan Tosu	2001	J2 League	25	0	0	0	0	0	25	0
Career total			92	2	8	0	5	0	105	2
