= Odion Obadin =

Nigerian footballer (born 1988)

Personal information
- Full name: Odion Anthony Obadin
- Date of birth: 6 December 1988 (age 37)
- Place of birth: Lagos, Nigeria
- Height: 1.86 m (6 ft 1 in)
- Position: Centre-back

Team information
- Current team: IL Flint
- Number: 3

Senior career*
Years	Team	Apps	(Gls)
2006–2007	Heart of Lions F.C.		
2007–2008	Dragons de l'Oueme		
2008–2009	Gombak United FC		
2010–2012	Phnom Penh Crown FC		
2013–2016	Phnom Penh Crown FC		
2016	CMAC FC		
2017–2020	IL Flint		
- * Club domestic league appearances and goals

Odion Obadin (6 December 1988) is a former Nigerian footballer who last played for IL Flint. He is a part of the Hausa people.

== Career ==
Obadin was born in Lagos, Nigeria.

=== Singapore ===
Coming to Gombak United of the Singapore S.League in 2008 on the recommendations of older brother Obadin Aikhena, Obadin was part of the Gombak squad that won the 2008 Singapore League Cup.

=== Cambodia ===
Unveiled as one of 2010 Cambodian League winners Phnom Penh Crown's new signings in November 2010, Obadin registered his first goal of the 2011 season in a 5–3 win over Chhlam Samuth, before leaving in late 2012 along with Henry Asonibe, Emmanuel Frimpong, and Kingsley Njoku. After looking for a club in Myanmar, he re-joined Phnom Penh Crown in early 2013, helping them to a third-place finish at the 2014 Mekong Club Championship among other honors which strengthened his unimpeachable status as team captain.

In 2012, the Nigerian defender was refused entry into China on the way to Tajikistan to represent Phnom Penh Crown in that year's AFC President's Cup.

=== Norway ===
Trialling for Ullensaker/Kisa IL in 2016, Obadin moved to IL Flint in 2017.

== Honors ==
Singapore

- Singapore League Cup: 2008

Cambodia

- Cambodian League: 2011, 2014, 2015
