= Yusuke Ueda =

Japanese footballer

Personal information
- Date of birth: 20 October 1990 (age 36)
- Place of birth: Shizuoka Prefecture, Japan

Youth career
- 2006–2008: Kato Gakuen High School

College career
Years	Team	Apps	(Gls)
2009–2012	Kibi International University		

Senior career*
Years	Team	Apps	(Gls)
2013–2014	SP Kyoto FC		
2014	Albirex Niigata Singapore FC	7	(0)
2014	Albirex Niigata Phnom Penh FC		
2016–	Wollongong Olympic FC	54	(43)
- * Club domestic league appearances and goals

Yusuke Ueda (Japanese: 上田祐輔, Ueda Yusuke, born 20 October 1990 in Shizuoka Prefecture, Japan) is a Japanese footballer who currently plays for Wollongong Olympic of the Australian Illawarra Premier League as of 2016.

== Career ==
=== Singapore ===
Engaged in a transfer to Albirex Niigata S of the Singapore Premier League for 2014.

=== Cambodia ===
Finalized a switch to Albirex Niigata subsidiary Albirex Niigata Phnom Penh for the rest of 2014.

=== Australia ===
He practiced with a Sydney National Premier Leagues side in winter 2015, Ueda was announced as a Wollongong Olympic athlete in 2016, with his contract renewed for the 2017 and 2018 seasons, producing hat-tricks in a 4-1 crushing of Port Kembla as well in a 3-0 trouncing of Albion Park White Eagles during 2017, also producing a brace to overpower Cringila Lions 2–0 on 28 April 2018.
