= Albirex Niigata Phnom Penh FC =

Cambodian football club

Albirex Niigata Phnom Penh
- Full name: Albirex Niigata Football Club Phnom Penh
- Founded: 2013
- Dissolved: 2015
- Ground: Olympic Stadium (Phnom Penh)
- Capacity: 50,000
- Chairman: Daisuke Korenaga
- Head Coach: Junki Kato
- League: Cambodian League
- 2014: 12th
- Website: http://www.albirex-phnompenh.com
Home colours	Away colours

Albirex Niigata FC Phnom Penh (アルビレックス新潟ＦＣプノンペン) was a professional football club based in Phnom Penh, Cambodia which competed in the Cambodian League, the top domestic division. It was a satellite team of Albirex Niigata.

== History ==
Daisuke Korenaga, the Managing Director & CEO of Albirex Niigata Singapore, is establishing a wholly owned subsidiary in Phnom Penh participating in the Cambodian League from January 2014.

Albirex Niigata Phnom Penh started off their 2014 season with the club restricted to five Japanese per team in which they sign Tatsuta Kazuki, Yusuke Ueda, Wada Yuya and Nokata Hayato. Albirex Niigata Phnom Penh can use field three Japanese players in each matches. The club ended the season badly finishing at the bottom of the league with 2 wins, 4 draws and 16 lost which see them relegated to the 2nd division.

Albirex Niigata Phnom Penh see them having a good run in the 2015 Hun Sen Cup in which they were drawn in Group A and manage to qualify to the quarter-final as group runner-ups seeing them face Cambodian Tiger but they face a 2–0 defeat which see their cup run ended shortly. After announcing the withdrawal from 2015 Cambodian League, the club decided to disband their first team.

After pulling out of the Cambodian League, the club continue their initiatives to help develop football in Cambodia. They have hosted football clinics and training camps for children in Cambodia, which are free for the locals. The club also initiated community and corporate futsal tournaments, such as Tsubasa Futsal Cup and the Corporate Champions League, to promote local participation and engagement among non-professional workers. Professional players are barred from competing in such futsal tournaments.

== Management and staff ==
Position	Name
Chairman & CEO	(Japan) Daisuke Korenaga
Technical director	
Head coach	(Japan) Junki Kato
Assistant coach	
Goalkeeper coach	
Fitness coach	
General manager	(Japan) Noriaki Ikeda
Physiotherapist	
Kitman	

== Honours ==
- Metfone Cambodian League
  - Fair Play Award: 2014

== Leagues & Cups ==
=== Leagues ===
Season	League	Pos	Pld	W	D	L	GF	GA	GD	Pts	Remarks
2014	Metfone C-League	12th	22	2	4	16	25	69	-44	10	Relegation Playoff
2015	Metfone C-League	Did not participate									Withdrawal

=== Cups ===
Season	Cup	Progress
2014	Hun Sen Cup	Did not participate
2015	Hun Sen Cup	Quarter-finals

== Affiliated clubs ==
- (Japan) Albirex Niigata
- Japan Soccer College
- (Singapore) Albirex Niigata Ladies
- Albirex Niigata Singapore
- (Spain) Albirex Niigata Barcelona
