= Albirex Niigata =

Japanese football club

- Full name: Albirex Niigata
- Nickname: White Swans
- Founded: 1955; 71 years ago as Niigata Eleven SC
- Stadium: Denka Big Swan Stadium, Niigata
- Capacity: 42,300
- Chairman: Daisuke Korenaga
- Manager: Yuzo Funakoshi
- League: J2 League
- 2025: J1 League, 20th of 20 (relegated)
- Website: www.albirex.co.jp
Home colours	Away colours

Albirex Niigata (アルビレックス新潟, Arubirekkusu Nīgata) is a professional football club based in Niigata, Japan. Formed in 1955 as Niigata Eleven SC, it was renamed Albireo Niigata in 1995, and Albirex Niigata in 1997. They currently compete in J2 League, the second division in the Japanese football league pyramid.

== History ==
=== Origins and early development (1955–1997) ===
Albirex Niigata traces its origins to 1955 when the club was founded as Niigata Eleven SC, an amateur football team based in Niigata. Over the following decades, the club competed in regional leagues and gradually developed a strong local following in the Hokuriku region. In the 1990s, as Japanese football moved towards professionalisation, the club began restructuring in order to meet the requirements of professional competition. In 1996, the team adopted the name Albireo Niigata, combining the Latin word albus (white) with rex (king), referencing the bright star Albireo in the Cygnus constellation. The new name symbolised the club's ambition and connection to Niigata's identity as the "City of Stars". Two years later in 1997, the club name was changed to Albirex Niigata.

=== Entry into the J.League and promotion to J1 (1998–2003) ===
In 1998, Albirex Niigata joined the Japan Football League, and was merged into the J2 League after its creation in 1999. The team gradually became competitive and in 2001 and 2002 it came close to getting promoted to J1. Albirex Niigata breakthrough came in the 2003 season when Albirex Niigata won the J2 League title. The championship secured the club's first promotion to the top tier of Japanese football, the J1 League.

=== Establishing themselves in J1 (2004–2016) ===
Following promotion, Albirex Niigata enjoyed a long period of stability in the J1 League. The club remained in the top division for more than a decade, becoming known for its passionate fanbase and consistently strong home attendances. Although the club did not win major domestic trophies during this period, Albirex Niigata regularly achieved respectable mid-table finishes and maintained its status as a competitive J1 side. The team also gained recognition for its youth development and strong regional identity.

=== Relegation and rebuilding (2017–2021) ===
In 2017, Albirex Niigata was relegated from the J1 League after finishing at the bottom of the standings, ending their 14-year stay in the top division. The club subsequently competed in the J2 League, entering a period of rebuilding and restructuring. Despite several attempts to regain promotion, Albirex remained in the second tier for several seasons as the club worked to rebuild its squad and long-term strategy.

=== Return to the top flight (2022–2025) ===
Albirex Niigata achieved promotion back to the top division in 2022 after winning the J2 League title. The success marked a major milestone in the club's recovery and secured their return to the J1 League. Since returning to J1, the club has focused on establishing stability and rebuilding its reputation in Japanese football. Supported by fanbases in the country, Albirex Niigata continues to play an important role in the football culture of Niigata Prefecture. However, they returned to the J2 League ahead of the 2026–27 season, following relegation in the 2025 season.

== Team image ==
The team name is made from combining the star Albireo of the constellation Cygnus (the Swan) and the Latin word Rex meaning king. In 1997, due to copyright issues, the team name was changed from Albireo Niigata to the current Albirex Niigata.

=== Name history ===
- Niigata Eleven Soccer Club (1955)
- Albireo Niigata (1995)
- Albirex Niigata (1997)

=== Rivalries ===
==== Hokushinetsu Derby ====
The primary regional rivalry of Albirex Niigata is with Kataller Toyama. Matches between the two sides are often referred to as the 'Hokushinetsu Derby', representing competition between clubs from the Hokuriku and Hokushinetsu areas of central Japan. The rivalry reflects regional pride between the neighbouring prefectures of Niigata Prefecture and Toyama Prefecture. Although the clubs have not always competed in the same division within the J.League system, encounters in league competitions and domestic tournaments have drawn strong interest from supporters.

== Stadium ==
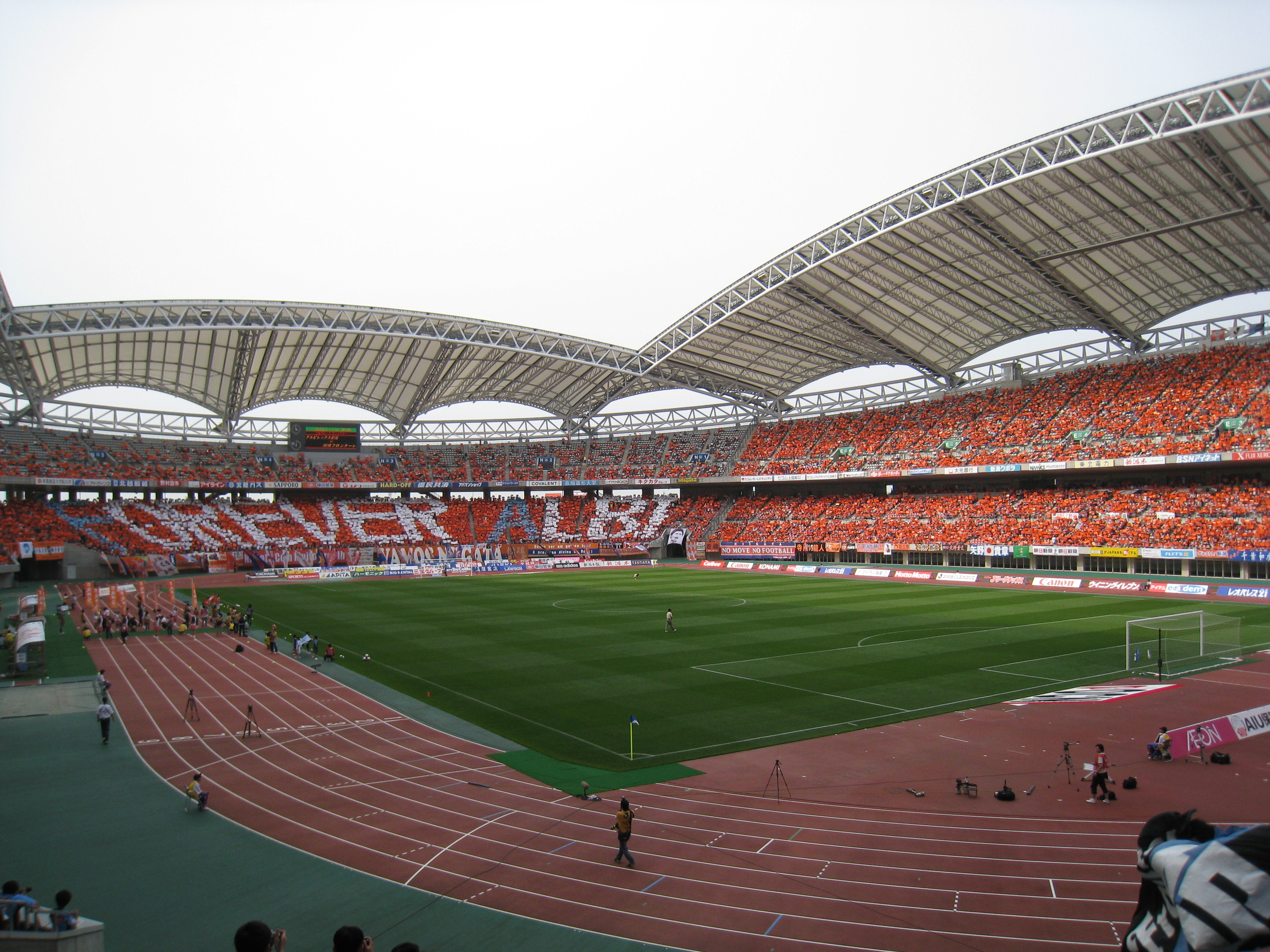
Denka Big Swan Stadium

Joining the J. League in 1999, its hometowns are Niigata and Seiro. Until 2003, it used Niigata Perfectural Sport Ground, but since 2004 the team began using Denka Big Swan Stadium. In 2003, it set a record for highest attendance in the J. League, with the cumulative total of around 660,000. Its practice grounds are Albirex's training facilities in Seiro Albillage and the Ijimino Sports Park (五十公野運動公園, Ijimino Undō Kōen) in Shibata. The stadium was opened in 2001 and has a capacity of 41,684. Prior to this the club had played its matches in the Niigata City Athletic Stadium constructed in 1938 with a capacity of 18,000. The stadium was the site of two first round matches and one Round of 16 match in the 2002 FIFA World Cup. It was also the venue for the 2009 National Sports Festival.

== Kit suppliers and shirt sponsors ==
Year	Kit manufacturer	Main sponsor
1997–1998	(Japan) Mizuno	(Mexico) Corona
1999–2002	(Italy) Kappa	(Japan) NSG Group
2003–2015	(Germany) Adidas	(Japan) NSG Group
2016–2019	(Germany) Adidas	(Japan) Happy Turn
2020–present	(Germany) Adidas	(Japan) NSG Group

=== Colours ===
Orange represents the sunset of Niigata, and blue represents the Sea of Japan.

=== Kit evolution ===
Home kits – 1st
1999 - 2000	2001 - 2002	2003 - 2004	2005 - 2006	2007
2008 - 2009	2010 - 2011	2012 – 2013	2014 – 2015	2016
2017	2018	2019	2020	2021
2022	2023	2024	2025	2026
2026/27 -

Away kits – 2nd
1999 – 2000	2001 – 2002	2003 - 2004	2005 - 2007	2008 - 2009
2010 - 2011	2012 – 2013	2014 - 2015	2016	2017
2018	2019	2020	2021	2022
2023	2024	2025-2026	2026/27 -	

3rd kits – Other
2015 CUP	2016 3rd	2016 CUP	2017 3rd	2017; Summer
2018; Isao Honma retirement match	2020; ONE NIIGATA; Memorial Blue			

== Affiliated clubs ==
Since 2004, Albirex Niigata has selected a number of players for its satellite team in the Singapore Premier League. Albirex also has a women's team and joined L2 league (an equivalent of J2) in 2004. Albirex Ladies won the L2 title in 2006, and went on to join L1 in 2007.

=== Currently affiliated clubs ===
- Albirex Niigata Ladies (Japan Women's Football League)
- Japan Soccer College (Hokushinetsu Football League)
- FC Jurong (Singapore Premier League)
- (Singapore) FC Jurong Women's (Women's Premier League)

=== Formerly affiliated club ===
- (Cambodia) Albirex Niigata Phnom Penh (Cambodian Premier League)

There is a Niigata Albirex basketball club in the B.League, as well as a ski, snowboard, baseball, and track and field team. Even though the teams share the same name, the management and finances are separated.

== Players ==
=== First-team squad ===
As of 16 September 2026.

Note: Flags indicate national team as defined under FIFA eligibility rules; some limited exceptions apply. Players may hold more than one non-FIFA nationality.

No.	Pos.	Nation	Player
2	DF	AUS	Jason Geria
3	DF	JPN	Tetsuya Kato
5	DF	NZL	Michael Fitzgerald (captain)
6	MF	JPN	Keisuke Kasai
7	MF	JPN	Yusuke Onishi
8	MF	JPN	Eiji Shirai
9	FW	BRA	Iury Castilho (on loan from Coritiba)
11	MF	BRA	Danilo Gomes
13	MF	JPN	Riku Ochiai
14	MF	JPN	Chihiro Konagaya
15	DF	JPN	Fumiya Hayakawa
16	FW	JPN	Tomoya Osawa
17	MF	JPN	Kazuyoshi Shimabuku
18	FW	JPN	Yamato Wakatsuki
19	MF	JPN	Yuji Hoshi
22	MF	JPN	Taiki Arai
23	GK	JPN	Daisuke Yoshimitsu

No.	Pos.	Nation	Player
24	DF	JPN	Rita Mori
26	DF	JPN	Mihiro Sato (on loan from Kashima Antlers)
30	MF	JPN	Masahiro Sekiguchi
32	FW	JPN	Kanji Kuwayama (on loan from Machida Zelvia)
33	DF	JPN	Toshiya Matsuoka
34	DF	JPN	Yūdai Fujiwara
38	DF	JPN	Kodai Mori
40	MF	JPN	Aozora Ishiyama
41	GK	JPN	Hiroto Matsuura ^{Type 2}
42	GK	JPN	Atomu Sato ^{Type 2}
46	GK	DOM	Noam Baumann
55	FW	BRA	Matheus Moraes
70	MF	JPN	Ryosuke Maeda
71	GK	JPN	Shota Uchiyama
77	DF	JPN	Kakeru Funaki
99	FW	JPN	Yuji Ono

=== Out on loan ===
Note: Flags indicate national team as defined under FIFA eligibility rules; some limited exceptions apply. Players may hold more than one non-FIFA nationality.

No.	Pos.	Nation	Player
21	GK	JPN	Ryuga Tashiro (at Tochigi SC)
—	FW	SWE	Abdelrahman Boudah (at (Sweden) Västerås SK)

No.	Pos.	Nation	Player
—	MF	JPN	Jimpei Yoshida (at Fukushima United)
—	MF	JPN	Yushin Otake (at (Singapore) Balestier)

== Management and staff ==
As of 8 March 2026

Position	Name
Manager	(Japan) Yuzo Funakoshi
Assistant coach	(Japan) Hiroaki Hiraoka (Japan) Katsushi Yano (Japan) Keita Tsuda (Japan) Kaichi Hiraoka (Japan) Mirai Morita (Japan) Tetsuo Hasegawa (Japan) Takuya Miyagawa
Physical coach	(Japan) Kerim Masaki Kobayashi
Goalkeeping coach	(Japan) Akehiro Tsuchiya (Japan) Yasuhiro Watanabe
Team doctor	(Japan) Satoshi Watanabe
Physiotherapist	(Japan) Takeshi Iokawa (Japan) Naoya Karahashi
Interpreter	(Japan) Yuta Kamikura (Brazil) Yoshio Kanashiro
Kitman	(Japan) Kota Tamakawa

== Honours ==
Type	Honours	Titles	Season
League	J2 League	2	2003, 2022
League	Hokushinetsu Football League	3	1986, 1996, 1997

Bold is for those competition that are currently active or meant for professional leagues.

== Managerial history ==
As of 26 March 2026

Manager	Period	Honours	P	W	D	L	W %
(Netherlands) Frans van Balkom	1 February 1995–31 January 1998	– 1996 Hokushinetsu Football League – 1997 Hokushinetsu Football League	36	28	3	5	77.78
(Japan) Yoshikazu Nagai	1 February 1998–31 December 2000		76	35	7	34	46.05
(Japan) Yasuharu Sorimachi	1 February 2001–31 January 2006	– 2003 J2 League	196	97	40	59	49.49
(Japan) Jun Suzuki	1 February 2006–31 January 2010		136	51	32	53	37.50
(Japan) Hisashi Kurosaki	1 February 2010–21 May 2012		80	24	25	31	30.00
(Japan) Nobuhiro Ueno (caretaker)	22 May–10 June 2012		1	0	0	1	0.00
(Japan) Masaaki Yanagishita	11 June 2012–31 January 2016		68	20	18	30	29.41
(Japan) Tatsuma Yoshida	1 February–27 September 2016		30	7	6	17	23.33
(Japan) Koichiro Katafuchi (caretaker)	27 September 2016–31 January 2017		4	1	0	3	25.00
(Japan) Fumitake Miura	1 February–7 May 2017		10	1	2	7	10.00
(Japan) Koichiro Katafuchi (caretaker)	8–10 May 2017		0	0	0	0	—
(Japan) Wagner Lopes	11 May–31 December 2017		23	6	5	12	26.09
(Japan) Masakazu Suzuki	1 February–7 August 2018		27	8	5	14	29.63
(Japan) Koichiro Katafuchi	8 August 2018–13 April 2019		24	10	6	8	41.67
(Japan) Kazuaki Yoshinaga	14 April 2019–31 January 2020		33	14	7	12	42.42
(Spain) Albert Puig	1 February 2020–31 January 2022		84	32	29	23	38.10
(Japan) Rikizo Matsuhashi	1 February 2022–31 January 2025	– 2022 J2 League	43	25	9	9	58.14
(Japan) Daisuke Kimori	1 February–23 June 2025		24	7	7	10	29.17
(Japan) Toru Irie (interim)	23 June–6 December 2025		18	0	5	13	0.00
(Japan) Yuzo Funakoshi	7 December 2025–present		4	3	0	1	75.00

== Season by season record ==
Champions	Runners-up	Third place	Promoted	Relegated

League													J.League Cup	Emperor's Cup
Season	Div.	Teams	Pos.	P	W (OTW)	D	L (OTL)	F	A	GD	Pts	Attendance/G	J.League Cup	Emperor's Cup
1999	J2	10	4th	36	16 (4)	2	13 (1)	46	40	6	58	4,211	First round	Third round
2000	J2	11	7th	40	11 (4)	5	18 (2)	54	63	9	46	4,007	First round	Round of 16
2001	J2	12	4th	44	22 (4)	4	7 (7)	79	47	32	78	16,659	First round	Round of 16
2002	J2	12	7th	44	23	13	8	75	47	28	82	21,478	Not eligible	Third round
2003	J2	12	1st	44	27	7	10	80	40	40	88	30,339	Not eligible	Round of 16
2004	J1	16	10th	30	10	7	13	47	58	–11	37	37,689	Group stage	Fourth round
2005	J1	18	12th	34	11	9	14	47	62	–15	42	40,114	Group stage	Round of 16
2006	J1	18	14th	34	12	6	16	46	65	–19	42	38,709	Group stage	Round of 16
2007	J1	18	6th	34	15	6	13	48	47	1	51	38,276	Group stage	Fourth round
2008	J1	18	13th	34	11	9	14	32	46	–14	37	34,490	Group stage	Round of 16
2009	J1	18	8th	34	13	11	10	42	31	11	50	33,446	Group stage	Quarter-finals
2010	J1	18	9th	34	12	13	9	48	45	3	49	30,542	Group stage	Round of 16
2011	J1	18	14th	34	10	9	15	38	46	–8	39	26,049	Quarter-finals	Third round
2012	J1	18	15th	34	10	10	14	29	34	–5	40	25,018	Group stage	Third round
2013	J1	18	7th	34	17	4	13	48	42	6	55	26,112	Group stage	Third round
2014	J1	18	12th	34	12	8	14	30	36	–6	44	22,979	Group stage	Third round
2015	J1	18	15th	34	8	10	16	41	58	–17	34	21,936	Semi-finals	Third round
2016	J1	18	15th	34	8	6	20	33	49	–16	30	21,181	Group stage	Round of 16
2017	J1	18	17th	34	7	7	20	28	60	–32	28	22,034	Group stage	Third round
2018	J2	22	16th	42	15	8	19	48	56	–8	53	14,913	Group stage	Third round
2019	J2	22	10th	42	17	11	14	71	52	–19	62	14,497	Not eligible	Second round
2020 †	J2	22	11th	42	14	15	13	55	55	0	57	5,361	Not eligible	Did not qualify
2021 †	J2	22	6th	42	18	14	10	61	40	21	68	10,879	Not eligible	Third round
2022	J2	22	1st	42	25	9	8	73	35	38	84	14,954	Not eligible	Second round
2023	J1	18	10th	34	11	12	11	36	40	–4	45	21,731	Group stage	Quarter-finals
2024	J1	20	16th	38	10	12	16	44	59	–15	42	22,430	Runners-up	Third round
2025	J1	20	20th	38	4	12	22	36	67	–31	24	22,600	Third round	Third round
2026	J2	40	7th	18	9	5	4	21	17	4	35	16,046	N/A	N/A
2026–27	J2	20	TBD	38									TBD	TBD

Key

- Pos. = Position in league; P = Games played; W = Games won; D = Games drawn; L = Games lost; F = Goals scored; A = Goals conceded; GD = Goals difference; Pts = Points gained
- Attendance/G = Average league home attendance
- † 2020 & 2021 seasons attendance reduced by COVID-19 pandemic
