= 2020 AFF Championship squads =

Association football competition squads

Below are the squads for the 2020 AFF Championship, which took place between 5 December 2021 and 1 January 2022.

The age listed for each player is on 5 December 2021, the first day of the tournament. The club listed is the club for which the player last played a competitive match prior to the tournament. The nationality for each club reflects the national association (not the league) to which the club is affiliated. A flag is included for coaches that are of a different nationality than their own national team.

== Group A ==
=== Thailand ===
Head coach: (Brazil) Alexandré Pölking

- Jonathan Khemdee withdrew due to illness.

| No. | Pos. | Player | Date of birth (age) | Club |
|---|---|---|---|---|
| 1 | GK | Kawin Thamsatchanan | 26 January 1990 (aged 31) | (Royal Belgian Football Association) OH Leuven |
| 2 | DF | Suriya Singmui | 7 April 1995 (aged 26) | (Football Association of Thailand) Chiangrai United |
| 3 | DF | Theerathon Bunmathan | 6 February 1990 (aged 31) | (Japan Football Association) Yokohama F. Marinos |
| 4 | DF | Manuel Bihr | 17 September 1993 (aged 28) | (Football Association of Thailand) Bangkok United |
| 5 | DF | Elias Dolah | 24 April 1993 (aged 28) | (Football Association of Thailand) Port |
| 6 | MF | Sarach Yooyen | 30 May 1992 (aged 29) | (Football Association of Thailand) BG Pathum United |
| 7 | MF | Supachok Sarachat | 22 May 1998 (aged 23) | (Football Association of Thailand) Buriram United |
| 8 | MF | Thitiphan Puangchan | 1 September 1993 (aged 28) | (Football Association of Thailand) Bangkok United |
| 9 | FW | Adisak Kraisorn | 1 February 1991 (aged 30) | (Football Association of Thailand) Muangthong United |
| 10 | FW | Teerasil Dangda | 6 June 1988 (aged 33) | (Football Association of Thailand) BG Pathum United |
| 11 | FW | Bordin Phala | 20 December 1994 (aged 26) | (Football Association of Thailand) Port |
| 12 | MF | Thanawat Suengchitthawon | 8 January 2000 (aged 21) | (The Football Association) Leicester City |
| 13 | DF | Philip Roller | 10 June 1994 (aged 27) | (Football Association of Thailand) Port |
| 14 | FW | Pathompol Charoenrattanapirom | 21 April 1994 (aged 27) | (Football Association of Thailand) BG Pathum United |
| 15 | DF | Narubadin Weerawatnodom | 12 July 1994 (aged 27) | (Football Association of Thailand) Buriram United |
| 16 | MF | Phitiwat Sukjitthammakul | 1 February 1995 (aged 26) | (Football Association of Thailand) Chiangrai United |
| 17 | FW | Janepob Phokhi | 4 April 1996 (aged 25) | (Football Association of Thailand) Police Tero |
| 18 | MF | Chanathip Songkrasin (captain) | 5 October 1993 (aged 28) | (Japan Football Association) Hokkaido Consadole Sapporo |
| 19 | DF | Tristan Do | 31 January 1993 (aged 28) | (Football Association of Thailand) Bangkok United |
| 20 | GK | Chatchai Budprom | 4 February 1987 (aged 34) | (Football Association of Thailand) BG Pathum United |
| 21 | FW | Sivakorn Tiatrakul | 7 July 1994 (aged 27) | (Football Association of Thailand) Chiangrai United |
| 22 | FW | Supachai Chaided | 1 December 1998 (aged 23) | (Football Association of Thailand) Buriram United |
| 23 | GK | Siwarak Tedsungnoen | 20 April 1984 (aged 37) | (Football Association of Thailand) Buriram United |
| 24 | MF | Worachit Kanitsribampen | 24 August 1997 (aged 24) | (Football Association of Thailand) BG Pathum United |
| 25 | DF | Pawee Tanthatemee | 22 October 1996 (aged 25) | (Football Association of Thailand) Ratchaburi Mitr Phol |
| 26 | MF | Kritsada Kaman | 18 March 1999 (aged 22) | (Football Association of Thailand) Chonburi |
| 27 | MF | Weerathep Pomphan | 19 September 1996 (aged 25) | (Football Association of Thailand) Muangthong United |
| 28 | MF | Pokklaw Anan | 4 March 1991 (aged 30) | (Football Association of Thailand) Bangkok United |
| 29 | MF | Picha Autra | 7 January 1996 (aged 25) | (Football Association of Thailand) Muangthong United |
| 30 | DF | Jonathan Khemdee* | 17 May 2002 (aged 19) | (Danish Football Association) OB |

=== Myanmar ===
Head coach: (Germany) Antoine Hey

| No. | Pos. | Player | Date of birth (age) | Club |
|---|---|---|---|---|
| 1 | GK | Pyae Phyo Aung | 8 July 1991 (aged 30) | (Myanmar Football Federation) Hanthawaddy United |
| 2 | DF | Nyein Chan | 2 June 1991 (aged 30) | (Myanmar Football Federation) Shan United |
| 3 | DF | Zaw Ye Tun | 28 June 1994 (aged 27) | (Myanmar Football Federation) Yadanarbon |
| 4 | DF | David Htan | 13 May 1988 (aged 33) | (Myanmar Football Federation) Shan United |
| 5 | DF | Win Moe Kyaw | 9 October 1996 (aged 25) | (Myanmar Football Federation) Hanthawaddy United |
| 6 | MF | Hlaing Bo Bo | 8 July 1996 (aged 25) | (Myanmar Football Federation) Yadanarbon |
| 7 | MF | Lwin Moe Aung | 10 December 1999 (aged 21) | (Myanmar Football Federation) Yangon United |
| 8 | MF | Maung Maung Win | 8 May 1990 (aged 31) | (Myanmar Football Federation) Yangon United |
| 9 | FW | Than Paing | 6 December 1996 (aged 24) | (Myanmar Football Federation) Shan United |
| 10 | MF | Yan Naing Oo | 31 March 1996 (aged 25) | (Myanmar Football Federation) Yangon United |
| 11 | FW | Maung Maung Lwin (captain) | 18 June 1995 (aged 26) | (Myanmar Football Federation) Yangon United |
| 12 | FW | Win Naing Tun | 3 May 2000 (aged 21) | (Myanmar Football Federation) Yangon United |
| 13 | FW | Aung Kaung Mann | 18 February 1998 (aged 23) | (Football Association of Malaysia) Sri Pahang |
| 14 | FW | Htet Phyo Wai | 21 January 2000 (aged 21) | (Myanmar Football Federation) Shan United |
| 16 | MF | Myat Kaung Khant | 15 July 2000 (aged 21) | Unattached |
| 17 | DF | Hein Phyo Win | 19 September 1998 (aged 23) | (Myanmar Football Federation) Shan United |
| 18 | GK | Myo Min Latt | 20 February 1995 (aged 26) | (Myanmar Football Federation) Shan United |
| 19 | MF | Nay Moe Naing | 13 December 1997 (aged 23) | (Myanmar Football Federation) Hanthawaddy United |
| 20 | FW | Suan Lam Mang | 28 July 1994 (aged 27) | Unattached |
| 21 | FW | Kaung Htet Soe | 1 September 1997 (aged 24) | (Myanmar Football Federation) Yangon United |
| 22 | MF | Aung Naing Win | 1 June 1997 (aged 24) | (Myanmar Football Federation) Ayeyawady United |
| 24 | GK | Pyae Phyo Thu | 21 October 2002 (aged 19) | Unattached |
| 25 | MF | Lar Din Maw Yar | 5 November 1988 (aged 33) | (Myanmar Football Federation) Hanthawaddy United |
| 27 | DF | Aung Wunna Soe | 19 April 2000 (aged 21) | (Myanmar Football Federation) Yadanarbon |
| 30 | FW | Hein Htet Aung | 5 October 2001 (aged 20) | (Football Association of Malaysia) Selangor |

=== Philippines ===
Head coach: (England) Stewart Hall

| No. | Pos. | Player | Date of birth (age) | Club |
|---|---|---|---|---|
| 1 | GK | Bernd Schipmann | 5 July 1994 (aged 27) | (Football Association of Thailand) Ratchaburi Mitr Phol |
| 2 | DF | Jesper Nyholm | 10 September 1993 (aged 28) | (Swedish Football Association) Djurgårdens IF |
| 6 | MF | Kevin Ingreso | 10 February 1993 (aged 28) | (Football Association of Thailand) Samut Prakan City |
| 7 | MF | Iain Ramsay | 27 February 1988 (aged 33) | (Football Association of Thailand) Nongbua Pitchaya |
| 8 | FW | Ángel Guirado | 9 December 1984 (aged 36) | (Royal Spanish Football Federation) Alhaurín de la Torre |
| 9 | FW | Bienvenido Marañón | 15 May 1986 (aged 35) | (Philippine Football Federation) United City |
| 10 | MF | Mike Ott | 2 March 1995 (aged 26) | (Philippine Football Federation) United City |
| 11 | DF | Daisuke Sato | 20 September 1994 (aged 27) | (Football Association of Thailand) Suphanburi |
| 12 | DF | Amani Aguinaldo | 24 April 1995 (aged 26) | (Football Association of Thailand) Nongbua Pitchaya |
| 13 | DF | Justin Baas | 16 March 2000 (aged 21) | (Philippine Football Federation) United City |
| 14 | MF | Oskari Kekkonen | 24 September 1999 (aged 22) | (Philippine Football Federation) ADT |
| 15 | GK | Quincy Kammeraad | 1 February 2001 (aged 20) | (Philippine Football Federation) ADT |
| 16 | GK | Kevin Ray Mendoza | 29 September 1994 (aged 27) | (Football Association of Malaysia) Kuala Lumpur City |
| 17 | MF | Stephan Schröck (captain) | 21 August 1986 (aged 35) | (Philippine Football Federation) United City |
| 18 | FW | Kenshiro Daniels | 13 January 1995 (aged 26) | (Philippine Football Federation) Kaya-Iloilo |
| 19 | MF | Yrick Gallantes | 14 January 2001 (aged 20) | (Philippine Football Federation) ADT |
| 20 | DF | Christian Rontini | 20 July 1999 (aged 22) | (Philippine Football Federation) ADT |
| 21 | FW | Oliver Bias | 15 June 2001 (aged 20) | (Philippine Football Federation) ADT |
| 22 | MF | Amin Nazari | 26 April 1993 (aged 28) | (Philippine Football Federation) United City |
| 23 | DF | Martin Steuble | 9 June 1988 (aged 33) | (Football Association of Thailand) Muangkan United |
| 24 | DF | Mar Diano | 24 July 1997 (aged 24) | (Philippine Football Federation) ADT |
| 29 | FW | Patrick Reichelt | 5 June 1988 (aged 33) | (Football Association of Thailand) Suphanburi |
| 30 | MF | Sandro Reyes | 29 March 2003 (aged 18) | (Philippine Football Federation) ADT |

=== Singapore ===
Head coach: (Japan) Tatsuma Yoshida

| No. | Pos. | Player | Date of birth (age) | Club |
|---|---|---|---|---|
| 1 | GK | Izwan Mahbud | 14 July 1990 (aged 31) | (Football Association of Singapore) Hougang United |
| 2 | DF | Shakir Hamzah | 20 October 1992 (aged 29) | (Football Association of Singapore) Tanjong Pagar United |
| 3 | DF | Tajeli Salamat | 7 February 1994 (aged 27) | (Football Association of Singapore) Lion City Sailors |
| 4 | DF | Nazrul Nazari | 11 February 1991 (aged 30) | (Football Association of Singapore) Hougang United |
| 5 | DF | Amirul Adli | 13 January 1996 (aged 25) | (Football Association of Singapore) Lion City Sailors |
| 6 | MF | Anumanthan Kumar | 14 July 1994 (aged 27) | Unattached |
| 7 | FW | Amy Recha | 13 May 1992 (aged 29) | (Football Association of Singapore) Geylang International |
| 8 | MF | Shahdan Sulaiman | 9 May 1988 (aged 33) | (Football Association of Singapore) Lion City Sailors |
| 9 | FW | Ikhsan Fandi | 9 April 1999 (aged 22) | (Norwegian Football Federation) Jerv |
| 10 | FW | Faris Ramli | 24 August 1992 (aged 29) | (Football Association of Singapore) Lion City Sailors |
| 11 | DF | Hafiz Nor | 22 August 1988 (aged 33) | (Football Association of Singapore) Lion City Sailors |
| 12 | GK | Syazwan Buhari | 22 September 1992 (aged 29) | (Football Association of Singapore) Tampines Rovers |
| 13 | DF | Zulqarnaen Suzliman | 29 March 1998 (aged 23) | (Football Association of Singapore) Lion City Sailors |
| 14 | MF | Hariss Harun (captain) | 19 November 1990 (aged 31) | (Football Association of Singapore) Lion City Sailors |
| 15 | MF | Song Ui-young | 8 November 1993 (aged 28) | (Football Association of Singapore) Lion City Sailors |
| 16 | MF | Hami Syahin | 16 December 1998 (aged 22) | (Football Association of Singapore) Lion City Sailors |
| 17 | DF | Irfan Fandi | 13 August 1997 (aged 24) | (Football Association of Thailand) BG Pathum United |
| 18 | GK | Hassan Sunny | 2 April 1984 (aged 37) | (Football Association of Singapore) Lion City Sailors |
| 19 | FW | Ilhan Fandi | 8 November 2002 (aged 19) | (Football Association of Singapore) Young Lions |
| 20 | FW | Shawal Anuar | 29 April 1991 (aged 30) | (Football Association of Singapore) Hougang United |
| 21 | DF | Safuwan Baharudin | 22 September 1991 (aged 30) | (Football Association of Malaysia) Selangor |
| 22 | FW | Gabriel Quak | 22 December 1990 (aged 30) | (Football Association of Singapore) Lion City Sailors |
| 23 | MF | Zulfahmi Arifin | 5 October 1991 (aged 30) | (Football Association of Thailand) Sukhothai |
| 24 | DF | Iqram Rifqi | 25 February 1996 (aged 25) | (Football Association of Singapore) Lion City Sailors |
| 25 | DF | Nur Adam Abdullah | 13 April 2001 (aged 20) | (Football Association of Singapore) Lion City Sailors |
| 27 | FW | Adam Swandi | 12 January 1996 (aged 25) | (Football Association of Singapore) Lion City Sailors |
| 28 | FW | Saifullah Akbar | 31 January 1999 (aged 22) | (Football Association of Singapore) Lion City Sailors |
| 30 | GK | Zharfan Rohaizad | 21 February 1997 (aged 24) | (Football Association of Singapore) Tanjong Pagar United |

=== Timor-Leste ===
Head coach: (Brazil) Fábio Magrão

| No. | Pos. | Player | Date of birth (age) | Club |
|---|---|---|---|---|
| 1 | GK | Aderito | 15 May 1997 (aged 24) | (East Timor Football Federation) Boavista Timor Leste |
| 3 | DF | Orcelio | 30 April 2001 (aged 20) | Unattached |
| 4 | DF | Jaimito Soares | 10 June 2003 (aged 18) | (East Timor Football Federation) Karketu Dili |
| 5 | DF | Tomas Sarmento | 24 August 2000 (aged 21) | (East Timor Football Federation) Ponta Leste |
| 6 | MF | Jhon Firth | 17 July 2002 (aged 19) | (East Timor Football Federation) SLB Laulara |
| 7 | FW | Rufino Gama | 20 June 1998 (aged 23) | (East Timor Football Federation) Lalenok United |
| 8 | MF | Olegario | 24 October 1994 (aged 27) | (East Timor Football Federation) Karketu Dili |
| 9 | FW | Anizo Correia | 23 May 2003 (aged 18) | Unattached |
| 10 | FW | João Pedro | 20 August 2000 (aged 21) | (Football Association of Malaysia) Kuala Kangsar |
| 11 | FW | Mouzinho | 26 February 2002 (aged 19) | (East Timor Football Federation) SLB Laulara |
| 12 | GK | Junildo Pereira | 4 June 2003 (aged 18) | Unattached |
| 13 | DF | Gumario | 8 October 2001 (aged 20) | (East Timor Football Federation) Lalenok United |
| 14 | MF | Cristevão | 16 January 2004 (aged 17) | Unattached |
| 15 | MF | Armindo (captain) | 18 April 1998 (aged 23) | (East Timor Football Federation) Lalenok United |
| 16 | FW | Zenivio | 22 April 2005 (aged 16) | Unattached |
| 17 | FW | Elias Mesquita | 27 March 2002 (aged 19) | (East Timor Football Federation) Lalenok United |
| 18 | DF | Filomeno | 5 August 2000 (aged 21) | (East Timor Football Federation) SLB Laulara |
| 20 | GK | Georgino Mendonça | 16 March 2002 (aged 19) | (East Timor Football Federation) SLB Laulara |
| 21 | FW | Paulo Gali | 31 December 2004 (aged 16) | (East Timor Football Federation) Lalenok United |
| 22 | DF | Nelson Viegas | 24 December 1999 (aged 21) | (East Timor Football Federation) Boavista Timor Leste |
| 24 | DF | Yohanes Gusmão | 10 January 2000 (aged 21) | (East Timor Football Federation) Lalenok United |
| 27 | MF | Dom Lucas Braz | 14 March 2001 (aged 20) | Unattached |
| 29 | DF | João Panji | 29 October 2000 (aged 21) | (East Timor Football Federation) Assalam FC |

== Group B ==
=== Vietnam ===
Head coach: (South Korea) Park Hang-seo

| No. | Pos. | Player | Date of birth (age) | Club |
|---|---|---|---|---|
| 1 | GK | Bùi Tấn Trường | 19 February 1986 (aged 35) | (Vietnam Football Federation) Hà Nội |
| 2 | DF | Đỗ Duy Mạnh | 29 September 1996 (aged 25) | (Vietnam Football Federation) Hà Nội |
| 3 | DF | Quế Ngọc Hải (captain) | 15 May 1993 (aged 28) | (Vietnam Football Federation) Viettel |
| 4 | DF | Bùi Tiến Dũng | 2 October 1995 (aged 26) | (Vietnam Football Federation) Viettel |
| 5 | MF | Phạm Xuân Mạnh | 9 February 1996 (aged 25) | (Vietnam Football Federation) Sông Lam Nghệ An |
| 6 | MF | Lương Xuân Trường | 28 April 1995 (aged 26) | (Vietnam Football Federation) Hoàng Anh Gia Lai |
| 7 | MF | Nguyễn Phong Hồng Duy | 13 June 1996 (aged 25) | (Vietnam Football Federation) Hoàng Anh Gia Lai |
| 8 | MF | Trần Minh Vương | 28 March 1995 (aged 26) | (Vietnam Football Federation) Hoàng Anh Gia Lai |
| 9 | FW | Nguyễn Văn Toàn | 12 April 1996 (aged 25) | (Vietnam Football Federation) Hoàng Anh Gia Lai |
| 10 | FW | Nguyễn Công Phượng | 21 January 1995 (aged 26) | (Vietnam Football Federation) Hoàng Anh Gia Lai |
| 11 | MF | Nguyễn Tuấn Anh | 16 May 1995 (aged 26) | (Vietnam Football Federation) Hoàng Anh Gia Lai |
| 12 | DF | Nguyễn Thanh Bình | 2 November 2000 (aged 21) | (Vietnam Football Federation) Viettel |
| 13 | DF | Hồ Tấn Tài | 6 November 1997 (aged 24) | (Vietnam Football Federation) Topenland Bình Định |
| 14 | MF | Nguyễn Hoàng Đức | 11 January 1998 (aged 23) | (Vietnam Football Federation) Viettel |
| 15 | MF | Phạm Đức Huy | 20 January 1995 (aged 26) | (Vietnam Football Federation) Hà Nội |
| 16 | DF | Nguyễn Thành Chung | 8 September 1997 (aged 24) | (Vietnam Football Federation) Hà Nội |
| 17 | DF | Vũ Văn Thanh | 14 April 1996 (aged 25) | (Vietnam Football Federation) Hoàng Anh Gia Lai |
| 18 | FW | Hà Đức Chinh | 22 September 1997 (aged 24) | (Vietnam Football Federation) SHB Đà Nẵng |
| 19 | MF | Nguyễn Quang Hải | 12 April 1997 (aged 24) | (Vietnam Football Federation) Hà Nội |
| 20 | MF | Phan Văn Đức | 11 April 1996 (aged 25) | (Vietnam Football Federation) Sông Lam Nghệ An |
| 21 | DF | Trần Đình Trọng | 25 April 1997 (aged 24) | (Vietnam Football Federation) Hà Nội |
| 22 | FW | Nguyễn Tiến Linh | 20 October 1997 (aged 24) | (Vietnam Football Federation) Becamex Bình Dương |
| 23 | GK | Trần Nguyên Mạnh | 20 December 1991 (aged 29) | (Vietnam Football Federation) Viettel |
| 24 | DF | Bùi Hoàng Việt Anh | 1 January 1999 (aged 22) | (Vietnam Football Federation) Hà Nội |
| 25 | GK | Nguyễn Văn Hoàng | 17 February 1995 (aged 26) | (Vietnam Football Federation) Sông Lam Nghệ An |
| 26 | DF | Đỗ Thanh Thịnh | 18 August 1998 (aged 23) | (Vietnam Football Federation) SHB Đà Nẵng |
| 27 | DF | Lê Văn Xuân | 27 February 1999 (aged 22) | (Vietnam Football Federation) Hà Nội |
| 28 | MF | Lý Công Hoàng Anh | 1 September 1999 (aged 22) | (Vietnam Football Federation) Hồng Lĩnh Hà Tĩnh |
| 29 | FW | Trần Văn Đạt | 26 December 2000 (aged 20) | (Vietnam Football Federation) Công An Nhân Dân |
| 30 | GK | Quan Văn Chuẩn | 7 January 2001 (aged 20) | (Vietnam Football Federation) Phú Thọ |

=== Malaysia ===
Head coach: Tan Cheng Hoe

| No. | Pos. | Player | Date of birth (age) | Club |
|---|---|---|---|---|
| 1 | GK | Khairul Azhan | 7 November 1989 (aged 32) | (Football Association of Malaysia) Selangor |
| 2 | DF | Dion Cools | 4 June 1996 (aged 25) | (Danish Football Association) FC Midtjylland |
| 3 | DF | Shahrul Saad | 8 July 1993 (aged 28) | (Football Association of Malaysia) Johor Darul Ta'zim |
| 4 | DF | Syahmi Safari | 5 February 1998 (aged 23) | (Football Association of Malaysia) Selangor |
| 5 | DF | Junior Eldstål | 16 September 1991 (aged 30) | (Football Association of Thailand) Chonburi |
| 6 | DF | Dominic Tan | 12 March 1997 (aged 24) | (Football Association of Malaysia) Sabah |
| 7 | DF | Aidil Zafuan (captain) | 3 August 1987 (aged 34) | (Football Association of Malaysia) Johor Darul Ta'zim |
| 8 | MF | Baddrol Bakhtiar | 1 February 1988 (aged 33) | (Football Association of Malaysia) Sabah |
| 9 | FW | Guilherme de Paula | 9 November 1986 (aged 35) | (Football Association of Malaysia) Johor Darul Ta'zim |
| 10 | FW | Shahrel Fikri | 17 October 1994 (aged 27) | (Football Association of Malaysia) Selangor |
| 11 | FW | Safawi Rasid | 5 March 1997 (aged 24) | (Football Association of Malaysia) Johor Darul Ta'zim |
| 12 | DF | Ariff Farhan | 14 July 1996 (aged 25) | (Football Association of Malaysia) Kedah Darul Aman |
| 13 | FW | Arif Aiman | 4 May 2002 (aged 19) | (Football Association of Malaysia) Johor Darul Ta'zim |
| 14 | MF | Mukhairi Ajmal | 7 November 2001 (aged 20) | (Football Association of Malaysia) Selangor |
| 15 | MF | Kogileswaran Raj | 21 September 1998 (aged 23) | (Football Association of Malaysia) Petaling Jaya City |
| 16 | DF | Rizal Ghazali | 1 October 1992 (aged 29) | (Football Association of Malaysia) Sabah |
| 17 | DF | Arif Fadzilah | 20 April 1996 (aged 25) | (Football Association of Malaysia) Terengganu |
| 18 | FW | Luqman Hakim | 5 March 2002 (aged 19) | (Royal Belgian Football Association) Kortrijk |
| 19 | FW | Akhyar Rashid | 1 May 1999 (aged 22) | (Football Association of Malaysia) Johor Darul Ta'zim |
| 20 | FW | Syafiq Ahmad | 28 June 1995 (aged 26) | (Football Association of Malaysia) Johor Darul Ta'zim |
| 21 | GK | Khairul Fahmi | 7 January 1989 (aged 32) | (Football Association of Malaysia) Melaka United |
| 22 | DF | Quentin Cheng | 20 November 1999 (aged 22) | (Football Association of Malaysia) Selangor |
| 23 | GK | Kalamullah Al-Hafiz | 30 July 1995 (aged 26) | (Football Association of Malaysia) Petaling Jaya City |
| 24 | FW | Faisal Halim | 7 January 1998 (aged 23) | (Football Association of Malaysia) Terengganu |

=== Indonesia ===
Head coach: (South Korea) Shin Tae-yong

| No. | Pos. | Player | Date of birth (age) | Club |
|---|---|---|---|---|
| 1 | GK | Ernando Ari | 27 February 2002 (aged 19) | (Football Association of Indonesia) Persebaya Surabaya |
| 2 | DF | Marckho Sandy | 4 December 1994 (aged 27) | (Football Association of Indonesia) Borneo |
| 3 | DF | Edo Febriansyah | 25 July 1997 (aged 24) | (Football Association of Indonesia) Persita Tangerang |
| 4 | DF | Ryuji Utomo | 1 July 1995 (aged 26) | (Football Association of Malaysia) Penang |
| 5 | DF | Rizky Ridho | 21 November 2001 (aged 20) | (Football Association of Indonesia) Persebaya Surabaya |
| 6 | MF | Evan Dimas (captain) | 13 March 1995 (aged 26) | (Football Association of Indonesia) Bhayangkara |
| 7 | FW | Ezra Walian | 22 October 1997 (aged 24) | (Football Association of Indonesia) Persib Bandung |
| 8 | FW | Witan Sulaeman | 8 October 2001 (aged 20) | (Polish Football Association) Lechia Gdańsk |
| 9 | FW | Kushedya Hari Yudo | 6 July 1993 (aged 28) | (Football Association of Indonesia) Arema |
| 10 | FW | Egy Maulana Vikri | 7 July 2000 (aged 21) | (Slovak Football Association) Senica |
| 11 | DF | Victor Igbonefo | 10 October 1985 (aged 36) | (Football Association of Indonesia) Persib Bandung |
| 12 | DF | Pratama Arhan | 21 December 2001 (aged 19) | (Football Association of Indonesia) PSIS Semarang |
| 13 | DF | Rachmat Irianto | 3 September 1999 (aged 22) | (Football Association of Indonesia) Persebaya Surabaya |
| 14 | DF | Asnawi Mangkualam | 4 October 1999 (aged 22) | (Korea Football Association) Ansan Greeners |
| 15 | MF | Ricky Kambuaya | 5 May 1996 (aged 25) | (Football Association of Indonesia) Persebaya Surabaya |
| 16 | DF | Rizky Dwi Febrianto | 22 February 1997 (aged 24) | (Football Association of Indonesia) Arema |
| 17 | MF | Syahrian Abimanyu | 25 April 1999 (aged 22) | (Football Association of Malaysia) Johor Darul Ta'zim |
| 18 | MF | Kadek Agung | 25 June 1998 (aged 23) | (Football Association of Indonesia) Bali United |
| 19 | DF | Fachruddin Aryanto | 19 February 1989 (aged 32) | (Football Association of Indonesia) Madura United |
| 20 | FW | Ramai Rumakiek | 19 April 2002 (aged 19) | (Football Association of Indonesia) Persipura Jayapura |
| 21 | GK | Muhammad Riyandi | 3 January 2000 (aged 21) | (Football Association of Indonesia) Barito Putera |
| 22 | FW | Yabes Roni | 6 February 1995 (aged 26) | (Football Association of Indonesia) Bali United |
| 23 | GK | Nadeo Argawinata | 9 March 1997 (aged 24) | (Football Association of Indonesia) Bali United |
| 24 | MF | Ahmad Agung | 9 March 1996 (aged 25) | (Football Association of Indonesia) Persik Kediri |
| 25 | FW | Irfan Jaya | 1 May 1996 (aged 25) | (Football Association of Indonesia) PSS Sleman |
| 26 | GK | Syahrul Trisna | 26 November 1995 (aged 26) | (Football Association of Indonesia) Persikabo 1973 |
| 27 | FW | Dedik Setiawan | 27 June 1994 (aged 27) | (Football Association of Indonesia) Arema |
| 28 | DF | Alfeandra Dewangga | 28 June 2001 (aged 20) | (Football Association of Indonesia) PSIS Semarang |
| 29 | FW | Hanis Saghara Putra | 8 September 1999 (aged 22) | (Football Association of Indonesia) Persikabo 1973 |
| 30 | DF | Elkan Baggott | 23 October 2002 (aged 19) | (The Football Association) Ipswich Town U23 |

=== Cambodia ===
Head coach: (Japan) Ryu Hirose

| No. | Pos. | Player | Date of birth (age) | Club |
|---|---|---|---|---|
| 1 | GK | Keo Soksela | 1 August 1997 (aged 24) | (Football Federation of Cambodia) Visakha |
| 2 | DF | Ken Chansopheak | 15 June 1998 (aged 23) | (Football Federation of Cambodia) Visakha |
| 3 | DF | Sath Rosib | 7 July 1997 (aged 24) | (Football Federation of Cambodia) Boeung Ket |
| 4 | DF | Sareth Krya | 4 March 1995 (aged 26) | (Football Federation of Cambodia) Preah Khan Reach Svay Rieng |
| 5 | DF | Soeuy Visal (captain) | 19 August 1995 (aged 26) | (Football Federation of Cambodia) Preah Khan Reach Svay Rieng |
| 6 | DF | Tes Sambath | 20 October 2000 (aged 21) | (Football Federation of Cambodia) Visakha |
| 7 | FW | Prak Mony Udom | 24 August 1994 (aged 27) | (Football Federation of Cambodia) Preah Khan Reach Svay Rieng |
| 8 | MF | Orn Chanpolin | 15 March 1998 (aged 23) | (Football Federation of Cambodia) Phnom Penh Crown |
| 9 | FW | Sieng Chanthea | 9 September 2002 (aged 19) | (Football Federation of Cambodia) Boeung Ket |
| 10 | MF | Kouch Sokumpheak | 15 February 1987 (aged 34) | (Football Federation of Cambodia) Nagaworld |
| 11 | FW | Chan Vathanaka | 23 January 1994 (aged 27) | (Football Federation of Cambodia) Boeung Ket |
| 12 | MF | Sos Suhana | 4 April 1992 (aged 29) | (Football Federation of Cambodia) Nagaworld |
| 13 | MF | Min Ratanak | 30 July 2002 (aged 19) | (Football Federation of Cambodia) Preah Khan Reach Svay Rieng |
| 14 | FW | Keo Sokpheng | 3 March 1992 (aged 29) | (Football Federation of Cambodia) Visakha |
| 15 | DF | Yue Safy | 8 November 2000 (aged 21) | (Football Federation of Cambodia) Phnom Penh Crown |
| 16 | MF | Chrerng Polroth | 4 July 1997 (aged 24) | (Football Federation of Cambodia) Visakha |
| 17 | FW | Lim Pisoth | 29 August 2001 (aged 20) | (Football Federation of Cambodia) Phnom Penh Crown |
| 18 | MF | Brak Thiva | 5 December 1998 (aged 23) | (Football Federation of Cambodia) Phnom Penh Crown |
| 19 | DF | Cheng Meng | 27 February 1998 (aged 23) | (Football Federation of Cambodia) Visakha |
| 20 | FW | Nhean Sosidan | 11 October 2002 (aged 19) | (Football Federation of Cambodia) Tiffy Army |
| 21 | GK | Vireak Dara | 30 October 2003 (aged 18) | (Football Federation of Cambodia) Prey Veng |
| 22 | GK | Hul Kimhuy | 7 April 2000 (aged 21) | (Football Federation of Cambodia) Boeung Ket |
| 23 | DF | Sor Rotana | 9 October 2002 (aged 19) | (Football Federation of Cambodia) Prey Veng |
| 24 | DF | Choun Chanchav | 5 May 1999 (aged 22) | (Football Federation of Cambodia) Phnom Penh Crown |
| 25 | DF | Chan Sarapich | 5 April 2002 (aged 19) | (Football Federation of Cambodia) Prey Veng |
| 26 | DF | Soeuth Nava | 13 February 2001 (aged 20) | (Football Federation of Cambodia) Boeung Ket |
| 27 | DF | Leng Nora | 19 September 2004 (aged 17) | (Football Federation of Cambodia) Prey Veng |
| 28 | MF | Sin Sovannmakara | 6 December 2004 (aged 16) | (Football Federation of Cambodia) Prey Veng |
| 29 | FW | Sa Ty | 4 April 2001 (aged 20) | (Football Federation of Cambodia) Electricite du Cambodge |
| 30 | FW | Ean Pisey | 11 March 2002 (aged 19) | (Football Federation of Cambodia) Preah Khan Reach Svay Rieng |

=== Laos ===
Head coach: (Singapore) V. Selvaraj

| No. | Pos. | Player | Date of birth (age) | Club |
|---|---|---|---|---|
| 1 | GK | Solasak Thilavong | 3 November 2003 (aged 18) | (Lao Football Federation) Young Elephants |
| 2 | DF | Phoutthavong Sangvilay | 16 October 2004 (aged 17) | (Lao Football Federation) Ezra |
| 3 | DF | Anantaza Siphongphan | 9 November 2004 (aged 17) | (Lao Football Federation) Ezra |
| 4 | DF | Kaharn Phetsivilay | 9 September 1999 (aged 22) | (Lao Football Federation) Young Elephants |
| 5 | MF | Phathana Phommathep | 27 February 1999 (aged 22) | (Lao Football Federation) Ezra |
| 6 | DF | Xeedee Phomsavanh | 28 March 2002 (aged 19) | (Lao Football Federation) Army |
| 7 | FW | Soukaphone Vongchiengkham (captain) | 9 March 1992 (aged 29) | (Football Association of Thailand) Udon Thani |
| 8 | MF | Mitsada Saytaifah | 4 November 1990 (aged 31) | (Football Association of Thailand) Satun United |
| 9 | FW | Kydavone Souvanny | 22 December 1999 (aged 21) | (Lao Football Federation) Young Elephants |
| 10 | MF | Phoutthasay Khochalern | 29 December 1995 (aged 25) | (Football Association of Thailand) Samut Prakan City |
| 11 | MF | Manolom Phetphakdy | 28 December 1991 (aged 29) | (Lao Football Federation) Young Elephants |
| 12 | GK | Keo-Oudone Souvannasangso | 19 June 2000 (aged 21) | (Lao Football Federation) Army |
| 13 | FW | Somxay Keohanam | 27 July 1998 (aged 23) | (Lao Football Federation) Young Elephants |
| 14 | GK | Seeamphone Sengsavang | 3 March 2001 (aged 20) | (Lao Football Federation) Young Elephants |
| 15 | DF | Thipphachanh Inthavong | 19 August 1996 (aged 25) | (Lao Football Federation) Chanthabouly |
| 16 | MF | Phoutthalak Thongsanith | 3 December 2002 (aged 19) | (Lao Football Federation) Ezra |
| 17 | FW | Bounphachan Bounkong | 29 November 2000 (aged 21) | (Lao Football Federation) Young Elephants |
| 18 | FW | Vannasone Douangmaity | 15 March 1997 (aged 24) | (Lao Football Federation) Young Elephants |
| 19 | DF | Nalongsit Chanthalangsy | 3 December 2001 (aged 20) | (Lao Football Federation) Viengchanh |
| 20 | DF | Sengdaovy Hanthavong | 4 October 1998 (aged 23) | (Lao Football Federation) Viengchanh |
| 21 | FW | Billy Ketkeophomphone | 24 March 1990 (aged 31) | (French Football Federation) Dunkerque |
| 22 | FW | Chony Waenpaseuth | 27 November 2002 (aged 19) | (Lao Football Federation) Ezra |
| 23 | DF | Chitpasong Latthachack | 3 May 1999 (aged 22) | (Lao Football Federation) Young Elephants |
| 24 | DF | Aphixay Thanakhanty | 15 July 1998 (aged 23) | (Lao Football Federation) Young Elephants |
| 25 | DF | Loungleung Keophouvong | 26 June 1997 (aged 24) | (Lao Football Federation) Young Elephants |
| 26 | MF | Vongphachanh Phoutthavong | 26 April 2003 (aged 18) | (Lao Football Federation) Twenty Six United |
| 27 | FW | Visith Bounpaserth | 23 January 2002 (aged 19) | (Lao Football Federation) Salavan Province |
| 28 | FW | Sisawad Dalavong | 11 August 1996 (aged 25) | (Lao Football Federation) Army |
| 29 | MF | Chanthavixay Khounthoumphone | 17 February 2004 (aged 17) | (Lao Football Federation) Savannakhet |
| 30 | GK | Xaysavath Souvanhansok | 3 September 1999 (aged 22) | (Lao Football Federation) Young Elephants |

== Statistics ==
=== By age ===
==== Outfield players ====
- Oldest: (Singapore) Hassan Sunny (37 years, 247 days)
- Youngest: (Timor-Leste) Zenivio (16 years, 197 days)

==== Goalkeepers ====
- Oldest: (Singapore) Hassan Sunny (37 years, 217 days)
- Youngest: (Laos) Solasak Thilavong (18 years, 32 days)

==== Captains ====
- Oldest: (Philippines) Stephan Schröck (35 years, 106 days)
- Youngest: (Timor-Leste) Armindo de Almeida (23 years, 231 days)

=== Player representation by league system ===
| Leagues | Players |
|---|---|
| (Thailand) Thai League 1 | 28 |
| (Vietnam) V.League 1 | 28 |
| (Laos) Lao Premier League | 26 |
| Malaysia Super League | 26 |
| (Indonesia) Liga 1 | 25 |
| Singapore Premier League | 25 |
| Myanmar National League | 21 |
| Liga Futebol Timor-Leste | 18 |
| Philippines Football League | 13 |
| (Thailand) Thai League 2 | 2 |
| (Vietnam) V.League 2 | 2 |
| (Thailand) Thai League 3 | 1 |

=== Player representation by club ===
Clubs with six or more players represented are listed.

| Club | Players |
|---|---|
| (Singapore) Lion City Sailors | 14 |
| (Laos) Young Elephants | 12 |
| (Vietnam) Hanoi FC | 9 |
| (Philippines) ADT | 9 |
| (Malaysia) Johor Darul Ta'zim | 8 |
| (Vietnam) Hoàng Anh Gia Lai | 7 |
| (Cambodia) Visakha | 6 |
| (Malaysia) Selangor | 6 |
| (Myanmar) Yangon United | 6 |
| (Myanmar) Shan United | 6 |
| (Thailand) BG Pathum United | 6 |
| Boavista Timor-Leste | 6 |

=== Player representation by club confederation ===
| Confederation | Players |
|---|---|
| AFC | 264 |
| UEFA | 13 |

=== Coaches representation by country ===
Coaches in bold represented their own country.

| Number | Country | Coaches |
|---|---|---|
| 2 | Brazil | Fábio Magrão (Timor-Leste), Alexandré Pölking (Thailand) |
| 2 | Japan | Ryu Hirose (Cambodia), Tatsuma Yoshida (Singapore) |
| 2 | South Korea | Park Hang-seo (Vietnam), Shin Tae-yong (Indonesia) |
| 1 | England | Stewart Hall (Philippines) |
| 1 | Germany | Antoine Hey (Myanmar) |
| 1 | Malaysia | **Tan Cheng Hoe** |
| 1 | Singapore | V. Selvaraj (Laos) |
