= 2020 AFF Championship Group B =

Group B was one of the two groups of competing nations at the 2020 AFF Championship. It consisted of title holders Vietnam, Malaysia, Indonesia, Cambodia and Laos. The matches took place from 6 to 19 December 2021.

Indonesia and Vietnam as the top two teams advanced to the semi-finals.

== Teams ==
| Draw position | Team | Appearance | Previous best performance | FIFA World Rankings (November 2021) |
|---|---|---|---|---|
| B1 | Vietnam | 13th | Winners (2008, 2018) | 94 |
| B2 | Malaysia | 13th | Winners (2010) | 154 |
| B3 | Indonesia (Note: Due to non-compliance with conditions set by the World Anti-Doping Agency (WADA), Indonesia was not allowed to be represented by its national flag. The sanctions took effect in October 2021.) | 13th | Runners-up (2000, 2002, 2004, 2010, 2016) | 166 |
| B4 | Cambodia | 8th | Group stage (1996, 2000, 2002, 2004, 2008, 2016, 2018) | 170 |
| B5 | Laos | 12th | Group stage (1996, 1998, 2000, 2002, 2004, 2007, 2008, 2010, 2012, 2014, 2018) | 185 |

== Standings ==
| Pos | Team | Pld | W | D | L | GF | GA | GD | Pts | Qualification |
|---|---|---|---|---|---|---|---|---|---|---|
| 1 | Indonesia | 4 | 3 | 1 | 0 | 13 | 4 | +9 | 10 | Advance to semi-finals |
| 2 | Vietnam | 4 | 3 | 1 | 0 | 9 | 0 | +9 | 10 | Advance to semi-finals |
| 3 | Malaysia | 4 | 2 | 0 | 2 | 8 | 8 | 0 | 6 | |
| 4 | Cambodia | 4 | 1 | 0 | 3 | 6 | 11 | −5 | 3 | |
| 5 | Laos | 4 | 0 | 0 | 4 | 1 | 14 | −13 | 0 | |

Source: AFF

== Matches ==
=== Cambodia vs Malaysia ===
6 December 2021
17:30

| Cambodia | 1–3 | Malaysia |
|---|---|---|
| Rosib 90' (pen.) | Report (AFFSZ); Report (AFF) | Safawi 23' (pen.); Akhyar 61'; Kogileswaran 78' |

Bishan Stadium, Bishan
Attendance: 518
Referee: Shukri Al-Hunfush (Saudi Arabia)

| Cambodia | Malaysia |

| GK | 1 | Keo Soksela |
| RB | 2 | Ken Chansopheak | (yellow card) 22' | (substituted off) 72' |
| CB | 6 | Tes Sambath |
| CB | 5 | Soeuy Visal (c) |
| LB | 19 | Cheng Meng |
| CM | 10 | Kouch Sokumpheak | | (substituted off) 84' |
| CM | 8 | Orn Chanpolin |
| RW | 11 | Chan Vathanaka | | (substituted off) 72' |
| AM | 12 | Sos Suhana | | (substituted off) 62' |
| LW | 17 | Lim Pisoth |
| CF | 9 | Sieng Chanthea | | (substituted off) 61' |
Substitutions:
| DF | 3 | Sath Rosib | | (substituted on) 61' |
| FW | 20 | Nhean Sosidan | | (substituted on) 62' |
| FW | 14 | Keo Sokpheng | | (substituted on) 72' |
| DF | 4 | Sareth Krya | | (substituted on) 72' |
| MF | 18 | Brak Thiva | | (substituted on) 84' |
Manager:
(Japan) Ryu Hirose

| GK | 21 | Khairul Fahmi | (yellow card) 89' |
| CB | 7 | Aidil Zafuan (c) |
| CB | 5 | Junior Eldstål | | (substituted off) 27' |
| CB | 3 | Shahrul Saad |
| RWB | 16 | Rizal Ghazali |
| LWB | 4 | Syahmi Safari |
| CM | 11 | Safawi Rasid | | (substituted off) 75' |
| CM | 8 | Baddrol Bakhtiar |
| CM | 19 | Akhyar Rashid | | (substituted off) 75' |
| CF | 20 | Syafiq Ahmad | | (substituted off) 75' |
| CF | 9 | Guilherme de Paula | | (substituted off) 65' |
Substitutions:
| MF | 14 | Mukhairi Ajmal | | (substituted on) 27' |
| FW | 18 | Luqman Hakim | | (substituted on) 65' |
| FW | 10 | Shahrel Fikri | | (substituted on) 75' |
| FW | 13 | Arif Aiman | | (substituted on) 75' |
| MF | 15 | Kogileswaran Raj | | (substituted on) 75' |
Manager:
Tan Cheng Hoe

=== Laos vs Vietnam ===
6 December 2021
20:30

| Laos | 0–2 | Vietnam |
|---|---|---|
| | Report (AFFSZ); Report (AFF) | Nguyễn Công Phượng 26'; Phan Văn Đức 55' |

Bishan Stadium, Bishan
Attendance: 812
Referee: Ahmad Yaqoub Ibrahim (Jordan)

| Laos | Vietnam |

| GK | 12 | Keo-Oudone Souvannasangso |
| RB | 6 | Xeedee Phomsavanh |
| CB | 3 | Anantaza Siphongphan |
| CB | 15 | Thipphachanh Inthavong |
| LB | 19 | Nalongsit Chanthalangsy | | (substituted off) 64' |
| CM | 10 | Phoutthasay Khochalern |
| CM | 8 | Mitsada Saytaifah | (yellow card) 45+6' |
| CM | 11 | Manolom Phetphakdy | | (substituted off) 68' |
| RF | 7 | Soukaphone Vongchiengkham (c) | (yellow card) 8' | (substituted off) 69' |
| CF | 21 | Billy Ketkeophomphone | | (substituted off) 86' |
| LF | 17 | Bounphachan Bounkong | | (substituted off) 86' |
Substitutions:
| DF | 23 | Chitpasong Latthachack | (yellow card) 74' | (substituted on) 64' |
| MF | 5 | Phathana Phommathep | | (substituted on) 68' |
| FW | 22 | Chony Waenpaseuth | | (substituted on) 69' |
| FW | 9 | Kydavone Souvanny | | (substituted on) 86' |
| FW | 13 | Somxay Keohanam | | (substituted on) 86' |
Manager:
(Singapore) V. Selvaraj

| GK | 23 | Trần Nguyên Mạnh |
| CB | 2 | Đỗ Duy Mạnh |
| CB | 16 | Nguyễn Thành Chung | (yellow card) 63' |
| CB | 4 | Bùi Tiến Dũng |
| RM | 13 | Hồ Tấn Tài | | (substituted off) 86' |
| CM | 14 | Nguyễn Hoàng Đức | | (substituted off) 46' |
| CM | 6 | Lương Xuân Trường (c) | | (substituted off) 70' |
| LM | 7 | Nguyễn Phong Hồng Duy | | (substituted off) 59' |
| RF | 10 | Nguyễn Công Phượng |
| CF | 22 | Nguyễn Tiến Linh | | (substituted off) 46' |
| LF | 20 | Phan Văn Đức |
Substitutions:
| MF | 19 | Nguyễn Quang Hải | | (substituted on) 46' |
| MF | 8 | Trần Minh Vương | | (substituted on) 46' |
| DF | 17 | Vũ Văn Thanh | | (substituted on) 59' |
| FW | 9 | Nguyễn Văn Toàn | | (substituted on) 70' |
| DF | 21 | Trần Đình Trọng | | (substituted on) 86' |
Manager:
(South Korea) Park Hang-seo

=== Malaysia vs Laos ===
9 December 2021
17:30

| Malaysia | 4–0 | Laos |
|---|---|---|
| Safawi 7', 34', 80'; Shahrul 78' | Report (AFFSZ); Report (AFF) |

Bishan Stadium, Bishan
Attendance: 427
Referee: Ammar Ebrahim Mahfoodh (Bahrain)

| Malaysia | Laos |

| GK | 21 | Khairul Fahmi |
| RB | 16 | Rizal Ghazali |
| CB | 7 | Aidil Zafuan (c) | (substituted off) 66' |
| CB | 3 | Shahrul Saad |
| LB | 4 | Syahmi Safari |
| RM | 11 | Safawi Rasid | (substituted off) 81' |
| CM | 14 | Mukhairi Ajmal |
| CM | 8 | Baddrol Bakhtiar |
| LM | 20 | Syafiq Ahmad | (substituted off) 66' |
| SS | 13 | Arif Aiman | (substituted off) 77' |
| CF | 18 | Luqman Hakim | (substituted off) 66' |
Substitutions:
| MF | 15 | Kogileswaran Raj | (substituted on) 66' |
| DF | 6 | Dominic Tan | (substituted on) 66' |
| FW | 10 | Shahrel Fikri | (substituted on) 66' |
| DF | 17 | Arif Fadzilah | (substituted on) 77' |
| FW | 9 | Guilherme de Paula | (substituted on) 81' |
Manager:
Tan Cheng Hoe

| GK | 12 | Keo-Oudone Souvannasangso |
| CB | 3 | Anantaza Siphongphan | | (substituted off) 46' |
| CB | 15 | Thipphachanh Inthavong |
| CB | 19 | Nalongsit Chanthalangsy | | (substituted off) 76' |
| RM | 6 | Xeedee Phomsavanh |
| CM | 10 | Phoutthasay Khochalern |
| CM | 8 | Mitsada Saytaifah | | (substituted off) 61' |
| CM | 11 | Manolom Phetphakdy | | (substituted off) 46' |
| LM | 17 | Bounphachan Bounkong |
| SS | 7 | Soukaphone Vongchiengkham (c) | | (substituted off) 46' |
| CF | 21 | Billy Ketkeophomphone |
Substitutions:
| DF | 4 | Kaharn Phetsivilay | | (substituted on) 46' |
| DF | 24 | Aphixay Thanakhanty | (yellow card) 59' | (substituted on) 46' |
| FW | 22 | Chony Waenpaseuth | | (substituted on) 46' |
| DF | 25 | Loungleung Keophouvong | | (substituted on) 61' |
| FW | 9 | Kydavone Souvanny | | (substituted on) 76' |
Manager:
(Singapore) V. Selvaraj

=== Indonesia vs Cambodia ===
9 December 2021
20:30

| Indonesia | 4–2 | Cambodia |
|---|---|---|
| Irianto 5', 33'; Evan 17'; Rumakiek 54' | Report (AFFSZ); Report (AFF) | Safy 37'; Mony Udom 60' |

Bishan Stadium, Bishan
Referee: Yaqoob Abdul Baki (Oman)

| Indonesia | Cambodia |

| GK | 26 | Syahrul Trisna |
| CB | 13 | Rachmat Irianto |
| CB | 4 | Ryuji Utomo | | (substituted off) 46' |
| CB | 28 | Alfeandra Dewangga |
| RWB | 14 | Asnawi Mangkualam |
| LWB | 12 | Pratama Arhan | | (substituted off) 41' |
| CM | 8 | Witan Sulaeman |
| CM | 6 | Evan Dimas (c) | | (substituted off) 72' |
| CM | 15 | Ricky Kambuaya |
| CF | 25 | Irfan Jaya | | (substituted off) 46' |
| CF | 7 | Ezra Walian | | (substituted off) 84' |
Substitutions:
| DF | 3 | Edo Febriansyah | (yellow card) 90+2' | (substituted on) 41' |
| DF | 11 | Victor Igbonefo | | (substituted on) 46' |
| FW | 20 | Ramai Rumakiek | (yellow card) 47' | (substituted on) 46' |
| MF | 17 | Syahrian Abimanyu | | (substituted on) 72' |
| FW | 9 | Kushedya Hari Yudo | | (substituted on) 84' |
Manager:
(South Korea) Shin Tae-yong

| GK | 22 | Hul Kimhuy |
| CB | 6 | Tes Sambath (c) |
| CB | 24 | Choun Chanchav | (substituted off) 77' |
| CB | 15 | Yue Safy |
| RWB | 4 | Sareth Krya |
| LWB | 3 | Sath Rosib | (substituted off) 57' |
| CM | 20 | Nhean Sosidan | (substituted off) 57' |
| CM | 13 | Min Ratanak | (substituted off) 57' |
| CM | 17 | Lim Pisoth |
| CF | 9 | Sieng Chanthea |
| CF | 14 | Keo Sokpheng | (substituted off) 71' |
Substitutions:
| FW | 7 | Prak Mony Udom | (substituted on) 57' |
| DF | 27 | Leng Nora | (substituted on) 57' |
| MF | 16 | Chrerng Polroth | (substituted on) 57' |
| MF | 18 | Brak Thiva | (substituted on) 71' |
| MF | 12 | Sos Suhana | (substituted on) 77' |
Manager:
(Japan) Ryu Hirose

=== Laos vs Indonesia ===
12 December 2021
17:30

| Laos | 1–5 | Indonesia |
|---|---|---|
| Kydavone 41' | Report (AFFSZ); Report (AFF) | Asnawi 23' (pen.); Irfan 34'; Witan 56'; Ezra 77'; Evan 84' |

Bishan Stadium, Bishan
Attendance: 207
Referee: Kim Hee-gon (South Korea)

| Laos | Indonesia |

| GK | 12 | Keo-Oudone Souvannasangso | | (substituted off) 46' |
| RB | 6 | Xeedee Phomsavanh | | (substituted off) 61' |
| CB | 4 | Kaharn Phetsivilay |
| CB | 15 | Thipphachanh Inthavong |
| LB | 25 | Loungleung Keophouvong | | (substituted off) 90' |
| CM | 8 | Mitsada Saytaifah | | (substituted off) 33' |
| CM | 10 | Phoutthasay Khochalern (c) |
| RW | 9 | Kydavone Souvanny |
| AM | 5 | Phathana Phommathep | (yellow card) 50' |
| LW | 17 | Bounphachan Bounkong | | (substituted off) 90' |
| CF | 21 | Billy Ketkeophomphone |
Substitutions:
| DF | 24 | Aphixay Thanakhanty | (yellow card) 36' | (substituted on) 33' |
| GK | 1 | Solasak Thilavong | | (substituted on) 46' |
| FW | 13 | Somxay Keohanam | | (substituted on) 61' |
| DF | 2 | Phoutthavong Sangvilay | | (substituted on) 90' |
| FW | 18 | Vannasone Douangmaity | | (substituted on) 90' |
Manager:
(Singapore) V. Selvaraj

| GK | 1 | Ernando Ari |
| CB | 13 | Rachmat Irianto | (substituted off) 46' |
| CB | 5 | Rizky Ridho | (substituted off) 71' |
| CB | 28 | Alfeandra Dewangga |
| CM | 14 | Asnawi Mangkualam |
| CM | 6 | Evan Dimas (c) |
| CM | 3 | Edo Febriansyah |
| RW | 25 | Irfan Jaya | (substituted off) 80' |
| AM | 15 | Ricky Kambuaya |
| LW | 9 | Kushedya Hari Yudo | (substituted off) 46' |
| CF | 27 | Dedik Setiawan | (substituted off) 71' |
Substitutions:
| FW | 8 | Witan Sulaeman | (substituted on) 46' |
| DF | 30 | Elkan Baggott | (substituted on) 46' |
| FW | 7 | Ezra Walian | (substituted on) 71' |
| DF | 19 | Fachrudin Aryanto | (substituted on) 71' |
| FW | 20 | Ramai Rumakiek | (substituted on) 80' |
Manager:
(South Korea) Shin Tae-yong

=== Vietnam vs Malaysia ===
12 December 2021
20:30

| Vietnam | 3–0 | Malaysia |
|---|---|---|
| Nguyễn Quang Hải 32'; Nguyễn Công Phượng 36'; Nguyễn Hoàng Đức 89' | Report (AFFSZ); Report (AFF) |

Bishan Stadium, Bishan
Attendance: 976
Referee: Ahmed Faisal Al-Ali (Jordan)

| Vietnam | Malaysia |

| GK | 23 | Trần Nguyên Mạnh |
| CB | 2 | Đỗ Duy Mạnh |
| CB | 3 | Quế Ngọc Hải (c) | (yellow card) 51' |
| CB | 16 | Nguyễn Thành Chung | | (substituted off) 64' |
| RM | 17 | Vũ Văn Thanh |
| CM | 11 | Nguyễn Tuấn Anh |
| CM | 14 | Nguyễn Hoàng Đức |
| LM | 7 | Nguyễn Phong Hồng Duy | | (substituted off) 76' |
| RF | 19 | Nguyễn Quang Hải | | (substituted off) 64' |
| CF | 10 | Nguyễn Công Phượng | | (substituted off) 55' |
| LF | 20 | Phan Văn Đức | | (substituted off) 75' |
Substitutions:
| FW | 22 | Nguyễn Tiến Linh | | (substituted on) 55' |
| FW | 9 | Nguyễn Văn Toàn | | (substituted on) 64' |
| DF | 4 | Bùi Tiến Dũng | | (substituted on) 64' |
| MF | 6 | Lương Xuân Trường | | (substituted on) 75' |
| DF | 13 | Hồ Tấn Tài | | (substituted on) 76' |
Manager:
(South Korea) Park Hang-seo

| GK | 21 | Khairul Fahmi |
| RB | 16 | Rizal Ghazali | (yellow card) 43' |
| CB | 7 | Aidil Zafuan (c) | | (substituted off) 24' |
| CB | 3 | Shahrul Saad | | (substituted off) 71' |
| LB | 4 | Syahmi Safari |
| RM | 11 | Safawi Rasid |
| CM | 14 | Mukhairi Ajmal | | (substituted off) 46' |
| CM | 8 | Baddrol Bakhtiar |
| LM | 20 | Syafiq Ahmad | | (substituted off) 71' |
| SS | 13 | Arif Aiman |
| CF | 18 | Luqman Hakim | | (substituted off) 46' |
Substitutions:
| DF | 6 | Dominic Tan | | (substituted on) 24' |
| MF | 15 | Kogileswaran Raj | | (substituted on) 46' |
| FW | 9 | Guilherme de Paula | | (substituted on) 46' |
| FW | 10 | Shahrel Fikri | | (substituted on) 71' |
| DF | 12 | Ariff Farhan | | (substituted on) 71' |
Manager:
Tan Cheng Hoe

=== Cambodia vs Laos ===
15 December 2021
17:30

| Cambodia | 3–0 | Laos |
|---|---|---|
| Vathanaka 31', 41'; Chanthea 74' | Report (AFFSZ); Report (AFF) |

Bishan Stadium, Bishan
Attendance: 129
Referee: Ahmad A'Qashah (Singapore)

| Cambodia | Laos |

| GK | 1 | Keo Soksela |
| RB | 2 | Ken Chansopheak | (substituted off) 87' |
| CB | 6 | Tes Sambath |
| CB | 5 | Soeuy Visal (c) |
| LB | 19 | Cheng Meng |
| CM | 10 | Kouch Sokumpheak | (substituted off) 75' |
| CM | 16 | Chrerng Polroth | (substituted off) 75' |
| RW | 11 | Chan Vathanaka | (substituted off) 61' |
| AM | 12 | Sos Suhana |
| LW | 17 | Lim Pisoth | (substituted off) 61' |
| CF | 9 | Sieng Chanthea |
Substitutions:
| FW | 30 | Ean Pisey | (substituted on) 61' |
| FW | 20 | Nhean Sosidan | (substituted on) 61' |
| MF | 13 | Min Ratanak | (substituted on) 75' |
| MF | 8 | Orn Chanpolin | (substituted on) 75' |
| DF | 25 | Chan Sarapich | (substituted on) 87' |
Manager:
(Japan) Ryu Hirose

| GK | 1 | Solasak Thilavong |
| RB | 6 | Xeedee Phomsavanh | (substituted off) 46' |
| CB | 4 | Kaharn Phetsivilay |
| CB | 15 | Thipphachanh Inthavong | (substituted off) 46' |
| LB | 2 | Phoutthavong Sangvilay |
| CM | 9 | Kydavone Souvanny | (substituted off) 77' |
| CM | 10 | Phoutthasay Khochalern (c) | (substituted off) 54' |
| CM | 17 | Bounphachan Bounkong |
| AM | 5 | Phathana Phommathep |
| CF | 18 | Vannasone Douangmaity | (substituted off) 46' |
| CF | 21 | Billy Ketkeophomphone |
Substitutions:
| DF | 20 | Sengdaovy Hanthavong | (substituted on) 46' |
| FW | 22 | Chony Waenpaseuth | (substituted on) 46' |
| DF | 3 | Anantaza Siphongphan | (substituted on) 46' |
| DF | 25 | Loungleung Keophouvong | (substituted on) 54' |
| FW | 13 | Somxay Keohanam | (substituted on) 77' |
Manager:
(Singapore) V. Selvaraj

=== Indonesia vs Vietnam ===
15 December 2021
20:30

| Indonesia | 0–0 | Vietnam |
|---|---|---|
| | Report (AFFSZ); Report (AFF) |

Bishan Stadium, Bishan
Attendance: 928
Referee: Kim Dae-yong (South Korea)

| Indonesia | Vietnam |

| GK | 23 | Nadeo Argawinata |
| RB | 14 | Asnawi Mangkualam (c) | (yellow card) 30' | (substituted off) 70' |
| CB | 19 | Fachrudin Aryanto |
| CB | 5 | Rizky Ridho |
| LB | 28 | Alfeandra Dewangga | (yellow card) 20' |
| DM | 13 | Rachmat Irianto | | (substituted off) 46' |
| RM | 8 | Witan Sulaeman | | (substituted off) 79' |
| LM | 12 | Pratama Arhan |
| AM | 15 | Ricky Kambuaya |
| CF | 25 | Irfan Jaya | | (substituted off) 74' |
| CF | 7 | Ezra Walian |
Substitutions:
| MF | 6 | Evan Dimas | (yellow card) 49' | (substituted on) 46' |
| DF | 16 | Rizky Dwi Febrianto | | (substituted on) 70' |
| FW | 20 | Ramai Rumakiek | | (substituted on) 74' |
| FW | 22 | Yabes Roni | (yellow card) 88' | (substituted on) 79' |
Manager:
(South Korea) Shin Tae-yong

| GK | 23 | Trần Nguyên Mạnh |
| CB | 16 | Nguyễn Thành Chung | | (substituted off) 80' |
| CB | 3 | Quế Ngọc Hải (c) |
| CB | 4 | Bùi Tiến Dũng | (yellow card) 61' |
| RM | 17 | Vũ Văn Thanh |
| CM | 11 | Nguyễn Tuấn Anh | | (substituted off) 65' |
| CM | 14 | Nguyễn Hoàng Đức |
| LM | 7 | Nguyễn Phong Hồng Duy |
| RF | 19 | Nguyễn Quang Hải | | (substituted off) 88' |
| CF | 10 | Nguyễn Công Phượng | | (substituted off) 46' |
| LF | 20 | Phan Văn Đức | | (substituted off) 80' |
Substitutions:
| FW | 22 | Nguyễn Tiến Linh | | (substituted on) 46' |
| FW | 18 | Hà Đức Chinh | | (substituted on) 65' |
| MF | 6 | Lương Xuân Trường | | (substituted on) 80' |
| DF | 2 | Đỗ Duy Mạnh | | (substituted on) 80' |
| FW | 9 | Nguyễn Văn Toàn | | (substituted on) 88' |
Manager:
(South Korea) Park Hang-seo

=== Vietnam vs Cambodia ===
19 December 2021
20:30

| Vietnam | 4–0 | Cambodia |
|---|---|---|
| Nguyễn Tiến Linh 3', 27'; Bùi Tiến Dũng 55'; Nguyễn Quang Hải 57' | Report (AFFSZ); Report (AFF) |

Bishan Stadium, Bishan
Attendance: 909
Referee: Yaqoob Abdul Baki (Oman)

| Vietnam | Cambodia |

| GK | 1 | Bùi Tấn Trường |
| CB | 2 | Đỗ Duy Mạnh |
| CB | 3 | Quế Ngọc Hải (c) |
| CB | 4 | Bùi Tiến Dũng |
| RWB | 13 | Hồ Tấn Tài |
| LWB | 7 | Nguyễn Phong Hồng Duy | (substituted off) 46' |
| CM | 19 | Nguyễn Quang Hải | (substituted off) 86' |
| CM | 14 | Nguyễn Hoàng Đức | (substituted off) 79' |
| CM | 20 | Phan Văn Đức | (substituted off) 66' |
| CF | 10 | Nguyễn Công Phượng | (substituted off) 46' |
| CF | 22 | Nguyễn Tiến Linh |
Substitutions:
| DF | 17 | Vũ Văn Thanh | (substituted on) 46' |
| MF | 6 | Lương Xuân Trường | (substituted on) 46' |
| FW | 9 | Nguyễn Văn Toàn | (substituted on) 66' |
| MF | 11 | Nguyễn Tuấn Anh | (substituted on) 79' |
| FW | 18 | Hà Đức Chinh | (substituted on) 86' |
Manager:
(South Korea) Park Hang-seo

| GK | 22 | Hul Kimhuy |
| CB | 6 | Tes Sambath (c) | | (substituted off) 78' |
| CB | 24 | Choun Chanchav |
| CB | 15 | Yue Safy |
| RM | 4 | Sareth Krya | | (substituted off) 59' |
| CM | 8 | Orn Chanpolin | | (substituted off) 69' |
| CM | 13 | Min Ratanak | | (substituted off) 59' |
| LM | 2 | Ken Chansopheak | (yellow card) 52' |
| RF | 11 | Chan Vathanaka | | (substituted off) 69' |
| CF | 9 | Sieng Chanthea |
| LF | 17 | Lim Pisoth |
Substitutions:
| DF | 27 | Leng Nora | | (substituted on) 59' |
| MF | 16 | Chrerng Polroth | | (substituted on) 59' |
| MF | 28 | Sin Sovannmakara | | (substituted on) 69' |
| FW | 29 | Sa Ty | | (substituted on) 69' |
| DF | 23 | Sor Rotana | | (substituted on) 78' |
Manager:
(Japan) Ryu Hirose

=== Malaysia vs Indonesia ===
19 December 2021
20:30

| Malaysia | 1–4 | Indonesia |
|---|---|---|
| Kogileswaran 13' | Report (AFFSZ); Report (AFF) | Irfan 36', 43'; Arhan 50'; Baggott 82' |

National Stadium, Kallang
Attendance: 7,082
Referee: Ammar Ebrahim Mahfoodh (Bahrain)

| Malaysia | Indonesia |

| GK | 21 | Khairul Fahmi |
| RB | 16 | Rizal Ghazali |
| CB | 2 | Dion Cools |
| CB | 5 | Junior Eldstål |
| LB | 4 | Syahmi Safari |
| CM | 11 | Safawi Rasid | | (substituted off) 46' |
| CM | 8 | Baddrol Bakhtiar (c) |
| CM | 24 | Faisal Halim |
| AM | 15 | Kogileswaran Raj | | (substituted off) 60' |
| CF | 13 | Arif Aiman | | (substituted off) 60' |
| CF | 20 | Syafiq Ahmad | | (substituted off) 77' |
Substitutions:
| DF | 6 | Dominic Tan | (yellow card) 70' | (substituted on) 46' | (substituted off) 89' |
| FW | 19 | Akhyar Rashid | | (substituted on) 60' |
| FW | 9 | Guilherme de Paula | | (substituted on) 60' |
| FW | 10 | Shahrel Fikri | | (substituted on) 77' |
| DF | 22 | Quentin Cheng | | (substituted on) 89' |
Manager:
Tan Cheng Hoe

| GK | 23 | Nadeo Argawinata |
| CB | 14 | Asnawi Mangkualam (c) |
| CB | 19 | Fachrudin Aryanto |
| CB | 12 | Pratama Arhan |
| RM | 8 | Witan Sulaeman |
| CM | 13 | Rachmat Irianto | | (substituted off) 76' |
| CM | 28 | Alfeandra Dewangga |
| LM | 20 | Ramai Rumakiek | (yellow card) 16' | (substituted off) 46' |
| AM | 15 | Ricky Kambuaya |
| CF | 25 | Irfan Jaya | | (substituted off) 90+3' |
| CF | 7 | Ezra Walian | (yellow card) 63' | (substituted off) 64' |
Substitutions:
| DF | 30 | Elkan Baggott | | (substituted on) 46' |
| FW | 9 | Kushedya Hari Yudo | | (substituted on) 64' | (substituted off) 90+3' |
| MF | 6 | Evan Dimas | | (substituted on) 76' |
| FW | 29 | Hanis Saghara Putra | | (substituted on) 90+3' |
| FW | 22 | Yabes Roni | | (substituted on) 90+3' |
Manager:
(South Korea) Shin Tae-yong
