= Football at the 2021 SEA Games – Men's team squads =

Below are the squads for the 2021 SEA Games, which took place between 6 and 22 May 2022.

Ten under-23 national teams affiliated with ASEAN Football Federation (AFF) and participating in this tournament are required to register a final squad containing up to 20 players, including two goalkeepers. Each team are allowed a maximum of three overage players.

== Group A ==
=== Vietnam ===
Head coach: (South Korea) Park Hang-seo

No.	Pos.	Player	Date of birth (age)	Club
1	GK	Quan Văn Chuẩn	7 January 2001 (age 25)	(Vietnam Football Federation) Hanoi
2	DF	Lê Văn Xuân	27 February 1999 (age 27)	(Vietnam Football Federation) Hanoi
3	DF	Vũ Tiến Long	4 April 2002 (age 24)	(Vietnam Football Federation) Hanoi
4	DF	Nguyễn Thanh Bình	2 November 2000 (age 26)	(Vietnam Football Federation) Viettel
5	DF	Lương Duy Cương	7 November 2001 (age 25)	(Vietnam Football Federation) SHB Da Nang
6	MF	Dụng Quang Nho	1 January 2000 (age 26)	(Vietnam Football Federation) Haiphong
7	MF	Lê Văn Đô	7 August 2001 (age 25)	(Vietnam Football Federation) Pho Hien
8	MF	Nguyễn Hai Long	27 August 2000 (age 26)	(Vietnam Football Federation) Hanoi
9	FW	Nguyễn Tiến Linh^{OA}	20 October 1997 (age 29)	(Vietnam Football Federation) Becamex Binh Duong
10	MF	Lý Công Hoàng Anh	1 December 1999 (age 26)	(Vietnam Football Federation) Binh Dinh
11	FW	Nguyễn Văn Tùng	2 June 2001 (age 25)	(Vietnam Football Federation) Hanoi
12	DF	Phan Tuấn Tài	7 January 2001 (age 25)	(Vietnam Football Federation) Daklak
13	MF	Nguyễn Trọng Long	6 January 2000 (age 26)	(Vietnam Football Federation) Ho Chi Minh City
14	MF	Nguyễn Hoàng Đức^{OA}	11 January 1998 (age 28)	(Vietnam Football Federation) Viettel
15	MF	Huỳnh Công Đến	19 August 2001 (age 25)	(Vietnam Football Federation) Pho Hien
16	MF	Đỗ Hùng Dũng^{OA}	8 September 1993 (age 33)	(Vietnam Football Federation) Hanoi
17	DF	Nhâm Mạnh Dũng	12 April 2000 (age 26)	(Vietnam Football Federation) Viettel
18	GK	Nguyễn Văn Toản	26 November 1999 (age 26)	(Vietnam Football Federation) Haiphong
19	FW	Hồ Thanh Minh	7 February 2000 (age 26)	(Vietnam Football Federation) Hue
20	DF	Bùi Hoàng Việt Anh	1 January 1999 (age 27)	(Vietnam Football Federation) Hanoi

=== Indonesia ===
Head coach: (South Korea) Shin Tae-yong

No.	Pos.	Player	Date of birth (age)	Caps	Goals	Club
1	GK	Adi Satryo	7 July 2001 (age 25)	0	0	(Football Association of Indonesia) Persik Kediri
2	DF	Alfeandra Dewangga	28 June 2001 (age 25)	4	0	(Football Association of Indonesia) PSIS Semarang
3	DF	Firza Andika	11 May 1999 (age 27)	16	0	(Football Association of Indonesia) Persija Jakarta
4	DF	Elkan Baggott	23 October 2002 (age 24)	0	0	(The Football Association) Ipswich Town
5	DF	Rizky Ridho	21 November 2001 (age 24)	4	0	(Football Association of Indonesia) Persebaya Surabaya
6	MF	Marc Klok^{OA}	20 April 1993 (age 33)	0	0	(Football Association of Indonesia) Persib Bandung
7	MF	Marselino Ferdinan	9 September 2004 (age 22)	4	0	(Football Association of Indonesia) Persebaya Surabaya
8	MF	Witan Sulaeman	8 October 2001 (age 25)	16	4	(Slovak Football Association) Senica
9	FW	Ronaldo Kwateh	19 October 2004 (age 22)	4	0	(Football Association of Indonesia) Madura United
10	FW	Egy Maulana Vikri	7 July 2000 (age 26)	13	5	(Slovak Football Association) Senica
11	MF	Saddil Ramdani	2 January 1999 (age 27)	22	5	(Football Association of Malaysia) Sabah
12	FW	Muhamad Ridwan	13 June 2000 (age 26)	0	0	(Football Association of Indonesia) Persik Kediri
13	MF	Rachmat Irianto	3 September 1999 (age 27)	18	1	(Football Association of Indonesia) Persib Bandung
14	DF	Asnawi Mangkualam	4 October 1999 (age 27)	28	2	(Korea Football Association) Ansan Greeners
15	MF	Ricky Kambuaya^{OA}	5 May 1996 (age 30)	0	0	(Football Association of Indonesia) Persib Bandung
16	DF	Rio Fahmi	6 October 2001 (age 25)	0	0	(Football Association of Indonesia) Persija Jakarta
17	MF	Syahrian Abimanyu	25 April 1999 (age 27)	9	0	(Football Association of Indonesia) Persija Jakarta
18	FW	Irfan Jauhari	31 January 2001 (age 25)	0	0	(Football Association of Indonesia) Persis Solo
19	DF	Fachruddin Aryanto^{OA}	19 February 1989 (age 37)	0	0	(Football Association of Indonesia) Madura United
20	GK	Ernando Ari	27 February 2002 (age 24)	4	0	(Football Association of Indonesia) Persebaya Surabaya

=== Myanmar ===
Head coach: (Bulgaria) Velizar Popov

No.	Pos.	Player	Date of birth (age)	Caps	Goals	Club
1	GK	Pyae Phyo Thu	11 October 2002 (aged 19)			(Myanmar Football Federation) Yadanarbon
2	DF	Win Moe Kyaw^{OA}	9 October 1996 (aged 25)			(Myanmar Football Federation) Hanthawaddy
3	DF	Hein Zeyar Lin	8 December 2000 (aged 21)			(Myanmar Football Federation) Yangon United
4	DF	Soe Moe Kyaw	23 March 1999 (aged 23)			(Football Association of Thailand) Kasetsart
5	DF	Thet Hein Soe	29 September 2001 (aged 20)			(Myanmar Football Federation) Yadanarbon
6	MF	Yan Kyaw Soe	4 January 2002 (aged 20)			(Myanmar Football Federation) Yangon united
7	MF	Lwin Moe Aung	10 December 1999 (aged 22)			(Football Association of Thailand) Rayong
8	MF	Myat Kaung Khant	15 July 2000 (aged 21)			(Myanmar Football Federation) Shan United
9	FW	Htet Phyo Wai	21 January 2000 (aged 22)			(Myanmar Football Federation) Yangon United
10	FW	Win Naing Tun	3 May 2000 (aged 22)			(Myanmar Football Federation) Yangon United
11	FW	Maung Maung Lwin^{OA}	18 June 1995 (aged 26)			(Football Association of Thailand) Lamphun Warriors
12	MF	Wai Lin Aung	30 July 1999 (aged 22)			(Myanmar Football Federation) ISPE
13	FW	Aung Kaung Mann^{OA}	18 February 1998 (aged 24)			(Football Association of Thailand) Udon Thani
14	DF	Ye Lin Htet	18 July 1999 (aged 22)			(Myanmar Football Federation) Hantharwady
15	DF	Aung Wunna Soe	19 April 2000 (aged 22)			(Myanmar Football Federation) Yadanarbon
16	MF	Lin Htet Soe	17 April 1999 (aged 22)			(Myanmar Football Federation) ISPE
17	DF	Thet Paing Htwe	26 March 2000 (aged 22)			(Myanmar Football Federation) Shan United
18	GK	Pyae Phyo Aung	7 April 2004 (aged 18)			(Myanmar Football Federation) Hantharwady
19	FW	Hein Htet Aung	5 October 2001 (aged 20)			(Football Association of Malaysia) Selangor
20	MF	Zaw Win Thein	1 March 2003 (aged 19)			(Myanmar Football Federation) Yangon United

=== Philippines ===
Head coach: (Philippines) Norman Fegidero

No.	Pos.	Player	Date of birth (age)	Caps	Goals	Club
1	GK	Quincy Kammeraad	1 February 2001 (aged 21)	5	0	(Philippine Football Federation) ADT
2	DF	Jayvee Kallukaran	7 September 2000 (aged 21)	1	0	(Philippine Football Federation) ADT
3	DF	Francis Tacardon	30 September 2001 (aged 20)	0	0	(Philippine Football Federation) ADT
4	DF	Scott Woods	7 May 2000 (aged 21)	3	0	(Philippine Football Federation) ADT
5	DF	Kike Linares	12 July 1999 (aged 22)	0	0	(Royal Spanish Football Federation) San Pedro
6	MF	Oskari Kekkonen	24 September 1999 (aged 22)	6	0	(Philippine Football Federation) Kaya–Iloilo
7	MF	Dennis Chung	24 January 2001 (aged 21)	10	2	(Philippine Football Federation) ADT
8	MF	Sandro Reyes	29 March 2003 (aged 19)	6	1	(Philippine Football Federation) Kaya–Iloilo
9	FW	Jovin Bedic^{OA}	8 June 1990 (aged 31)	0	0	(Philippine Football Federation) Kaya–Iloilo
10	FW	Oliver Bias	15 June 2001 (aged 20)	5	0	(Philippine Football Federation) ADT
11	DF	Yrick Gallantes	14 January 2001 (aged 21)	7	0	(Philippine Football Federation) ADT
12	DF	Miguel Mendoza	3 February 1999 (aged 23)	5	0	Unattached
13	MF	Jacob Peña	27 November 2002 (aged 19)	3	0	(Philippine Football Federation) Stallion Laguna
14	DF	Jaime Rosquillo	10 March 2003 (aged 19)	3	0	(Philippine Football Federation) ADT
15	MF	Martini Rey	13 June 1999 (aged 22)	0	0	(Philippine Football Federation) ADT
16	FW	Lance Ocampo	23 September 2001 (aged 20)	1	0	(Philippine Football Federation) ADT
17	MF	Stephan Schröck^{OA}	21 August 1986 (aged 35)	4	2	(Philippine Football Federation) United City
18	DF	Christian Rontini	20 July 1999 (aged 22)	7	0	(Football Association of Malaysia) Penang
19	MF	Jermi Darapan	15 November 1999 (aged 22)	0	0	(Philippine Football Federation) ADT
20	GK	Enrico Mangaoang	28 May 2002 (aged 19)	1	0	(Philippine Football Federation) ADT

=== Timor-Leste ===
Head coach: (Brazil) Fábio Magrão

No.	Pos.	Player	Date of birth (age)	Caps	Goals	Club
1	GK	Junildo Pereira	4 June 2003 (age 23)			(East Timor Football Federation) Assalam FC
2	DF	Nelson Viegas	24 December 1999 (age 26)			(East Timor Football Federation) Boavista Timor Leste
3	DF	Orcelio	30 April 2001 (age 25)			(East Timor Football Federation) Karketu Dili
4	DF	Jaimito Soares	10 June 2003 (age 23)			(East Timor Football Federation) Karketu Dili
5	DF	Tomas Sarmento	24 August 2000 (age 26)			(East Timor Football Federation) Ponta Leste
6	MF	Jhon Frith	17 July 2002 (age 24)			(East Timor Football Federation) SLB Laulara
7	MF	Elias Mesquita	27 March 2002 (age 24)			(East Timor Football Federation) Lalenok United
8	MF	Dom Lucas Braz	14 March 2001 (age 25)			(East Timor Football Federation) Assalam FC
9	FW	Anizo Correia	23 May 2003 (age 23)			(East Timor Football Federation) Ponta Leste
10	FW	Mouzinho	26 February 2002 (age 24)			(East Timor Football Federation) SLB Laulara
11	FW	Alexandro Kefi	20 December 2004 (age 21)			(East Timor Football Federation) SLB Laulara
12	DF	Yohanes Gusmão	10 January 2000 (age 26)			(East Timor Football Federation) Lalenok United
13	DF	Gumario	8 October 2001 (age 25)			(East Timor Football Federation) Lalenok United
14	MF	Cristevão	16 January 2004 (age 22)			(East Timor Football Federation) SLB Laulara
15	MF	Armindo de Almeida^{OA}	18 April 1998 (age 28)			(East Timor Football Federation) Ponta Leste
16	DF	João Bosco	2 March 2003 (age 23)			(East Timor Football Federation) SLB Laulara
17	FW	Zenivio	22 April 2005 (age 21)			(East Timor Football Federation) SLB Laulara
18	DF	Filomeno Junior	5 August 2000 (age 26)			(East Timor Football Federation) SLB Laulara
19	MF	Natalino da Costa	3 August 2003 (age 23)			(East Timor Football Federation) Karketu Dili
20	GK	Georgino Mendonça	16 March 2002 (age 24)			(East Timor Football Federation) SLB Laulara

== Group B ==
=== Thailand ===
Head coach: (Brazil) Alexandre Polking

No.	Pos.	Player	Date of birth (age)	Caps	Goals	Club
2	DF	Nakin Wisetchat	9 July 1999 (aged 22)	7	0	(Football Association of Thailand) BG Pathum United
3	FW	Mehti Sarakham	21 May 1999 (aged 22)	3	0	(Football Association of Thailand) PT Prachuap
4	DF	Jonathan Khemdee	9 May 2002 (aged 19)	3	0	(Danish Football Association) OB
5	DF	Anusak Jaiphet	23 June 1999 (aged 22)	7	0	(Football Association of Thailand) Port
6	MF	Airfan Doloh	26 January 2001 (aged 21)	5	0	(Football Association of Thailand) Buriram United
7	MF	Ekanit Panya	21 October 1999 (aged 22)	4	1	(Football Association of Thailand) Chiangmai United
8	FW	Korawich Tasa	7 April 2000 (aged 22)	9	1	(Football Association of Thailand) Muangthong United
9	FW	Patrik Gustavsson	19 April 2001 (aged 21)	3	0	(Football Association of Thailand) Chiangmai
10	MF	Worachit Kanitsribampen^{OA}	24 August 1997 (aged 24)	0	0	(Football Association of Thailand) BG Pathum United
11	MF	William Weidersjö	10 June 2001 (aged 20)	2	2	(Football Association of Thailand) Port
12	MF	Narakorn Noomchansakul	12 April 1999 (aged 23)	0	0	(Football Association of Thailand) Ratchaburi Mitr Phol
13	FW	Teerasak Poeiphimai	21 September 2002 (aged 19)	7	3	(Football Association of Thailand) Port
14	FW	Jakkit Palapon	1 July 1999 (aged 22)	3	2	(Football Association of Thailand) Khon Kaen United
15	DF	Jaturapat Sattham	15 June 1999 (aged 22)	5	0	(Football Association of Thailand) Port
16	DF	Chonnapat Buaphan	22 January 2004 (aged 18)	4	0	(Football Association of Thailand) Rajpracha
17	MF	Ben Davis	24 November 2000 (aged 21)	4	0	(The Football Association) Oxford United
18	MF	Weerathep Pomphan^{OA}	19 September 1996 (aged 25)	0	0	(Football Association of Thailand) Muangthong United
19	MF	Chayapipat Supunpasuch	25 February 2001 (aged 21)	0	0	(Portuguese Football Federation) Estoril
20	GK	Supanut Suadsong	25 February 1999 (aged 23)	0	0	(Football Association of Thailand) Bangkok United

=== Malaysia ===
Head coach: (Australia) Brad Maloney

No.	Pos.	Player	Date of birth (age)	Caps	Goals	Club
1	GK	Azri Ghani	30 April 1999 (age 27)			(Football Association of Malaysia) Kuala Lumpur City
2	DF	Quentin Cheng	20 November 1999 (age 26)			(Football Association of Malaysia) Selangor
3	DF	Faiz Amer	15 February 2003 (age 23)			(Football Association of Malaysia) Selangor II
4	DF	Azrin Afiq	2 January 2002 (age 24)			(Football Association of Malaysia) Selangor II
5	DF	Harith Haiqal	22 June 2002 (age 24)			(Football Association of Malaysia) Selangor
6	DF	Azam Azmi	12 February 2001 (age 25)			(Football Association of Malaysia) Terengganu
7	MF	Mukhairi Ajmal	7 November 2001 (age 25)			(Football Association of Malaysia) Selangor
8	MF	Nik Akif	11 May 1999 (age 27)			(Football Association of Malaysia) Terengganu
9	FW	Hadi Fayyadh	22 January 2000 (age 26)			(Japan Football Association) Azul Claro Numazu
10	FW	Luqman Hakim	5 March 2002 (age 24)			(Royal Belgian Football Association) Kortrijk
11	FW	Syafik Ismail	1 March 2000 (age 26)			(Football Association of Malaysia) Terengganu
12	DF	Hairiey Hakim	14 January 2000 (age 26)			(Football Association of Malaysia) Terengganu
13	FW	Azfar Fikri	5 February 2000 (age 26)			(Football Association of Malaysia) Terengganu II
14	DF	Zikri Khalili	25 June 2002 (age 24)			(Football Association of Malaysia) Selangor
15	DF	Ubaidullah Shamsul	30 November 2003 (age 22)			(Football Association of Malaysia) Projek FAM-MSN
16	MF	Syahir Bashah	16 September 2001 (age 25)			(Football Association of Malaysia) Selangor
17	MF	Safwan Mazlan	24 January 2002 (age 24)			(Football Association of Malaysia) Terengganu II
18	GK	Firdaus Irman	23 July 2001 (age 25)			(Football Association of Malaysia) PDRM
19	FW	Danial Asri	1 April 2000 (age 26)			(Football Association of Malaysia) Selangor
20	FW	Aiman Afif	18 February 2001 (age 25)			(Football Association of Malaysia) Kedah Darul Aman

=== Cambodia ===
Head coach: (Japan) Keisuke Honda

No.	Pos.	Player	Date of birth (age)	Caps	Goals	Club
1	GK	Hul Kimhuy	7 April 2000 (age 26)			(Football Federation of Cambodia) Boeung Ket
2	DF	Chea Sokmeng	26 November 2002 (age 23)			(Football Federation of Cambodia) Nagaworld
3	MF	Chou Sinti	1 April 2003 (age 23)			(Football Federation of Cambodia) Preah Khan Reach Svay Rieng
4	DF	Taing Bunchhai	28 December 2002 (age 23)			(Football Federation of Cambodia) Boeung Ket
5	DF	Phat Sokha	2 May 2003 (age 23)			(Football Federation of Cambodia) Nagaworld
6	DF	Soeuth Nava	13 February 2001 (age 25)			(Football Federation of Cambodia) Boeung Ket
7	FW	Ean Pisey	11 March 2002 (age 24)			(Football Federation of Cambodia) Preah Khan Reach Svay Rieng
8	MF	Choun Chanchav	5 May 1999 (age 27)			(Football Federation of Cambodia) Phnom Penh Crown
9	FW	Sieng Chanthea	9 September 2002 (age 24)			(Football Federation of Cambodia) Boeung Ket
10	FW	Lim Pisoth	29 August 2001 (age 25)			(Football Federation of Cambodia) Phnom Penh Crown
11	MF	Nhean Sosidan	11 October 2002 (age 24)			(Football Federation of Cambodia) Tiffy Army
12	FW	Mao Piseth	17 February 2000 (age 26)			(Football Federation of Cambodia) Angkor Tiger
13	MF	Min Ratanak	30 July 2002 (age 24)			(Football Federation of Cambodia) Preah Khan Reach Svay Rieng
14	MF	Sin Sovannmakara	6 December 2004 (age 21)			(Football Federation of Cambodia) Prey Veng
15	DF	Yue Safy	8 November 2000 (age 26)			(Football Federation of Cambodia) Phnom Penh Crown
16	FW	Ky Rina	5 August 2002 (age 24)			(Football Federation of Cambodia) Visakha
17	FW	Sa Ty	4 April 2002 (age 24)			(Football Federation of Cambodia) Visakha
18	FW	Im Som Oun	2 February 1999 (age 27)			(Football Federation of Cambodia) Kirivong Sok Sen Chey
19	DF	Vang Davin	23 January 2002 (age 24)			(Football Federation of Cambodia) Boeung Ket
20	GK	Vireak Dara	30 October 2003 (age 23)			(Football Federation of Cambodia) Visakha

=== Singapore ===
Head coach: (Singapore) Nazri Nasir

No.	Pos.	Player	Date of birth (age)	Caps	Goals	Club
1	GK	Zaiful Nizam^{OA}	24 July 1987 (age 39)	0	0	(Football Association of Singapore) Geylang International
2	DF	Irfan Najeeb	31 July 1999 (age 27)	9	0	(Football Association of Singapore) Tampines Rovers
3	DF	Jordan Emaviwe	9 April 2001 (age 25)	3	1	(Football Association of Singapore) Young Lions
4	DF	Nur Adam Abdullah	13 April 2001 (age 25)	2	1	(Football Association of Singapore) Lion City Sailors
5	DF	Ryaan Sanizal	31 May 2002 (age 24)	2	0	(Football Association of Singapore) Tampines Rovers
7	FW	Glenn Kweh	26 March 2000 (age 26)	3	2	(Football Association of Singapore) Young Lions
8	MF	Shah Shahiran	14 November 1999 (age 27)	9	0	(Football Association of Singapore) Young Lions
9	FW	Nicky Melvin Singh	16 June 2002 (age 24)	1	0	(Japan Football Association) Albirex Niigata (S)
10	MF	Saifullah Akbar	31 January 1999 (age 27)	8	1	(Football Association of Singapore) Lion City Sailors
11	DF	Harith Kanadi	1 August 2000 (age 26)	0	0	(Football Association of Singapore) Young Lions
12	MF	Arshad Shamim	9 December 1999 (age 26)	1	0	(Football Association of Singapore) Young Lions
13	DF	Syahrul Sazali^{OA}	3 June 1998 (age 28)	0	0	(Football Association of Singapore) Young Lions
14	MF	Jared Gallagher	18 January 2002 (age 24)	1	0	(Football Association of Singapore) Young Lions
15	MF	Harhys Stewart	20 March 2001 (age 25)	0	0	(Football Association of Singapore) Young Lions
16	DF	Ryhan Stewart	15 February 2000 (age 26)	12	0	(Football Association of Singapore) Young Lions
18	GK	Ridhwan Fikri	29 April 1999 (age 27)	3	0	(Football Association of Singapore) Young Lions
19	FW	Khairin Nadim	8 May 2004 (age 22)	2	0	(Football Association of Singapore) Young Lions
20	FW	Zikos Chua	15 April 2002 (age 24)	4	0	(Football Association of Singapore) Young Lions
23	MF	Zulfahmi Arifin^{OA}	5 October 1991 (age 35)	0	0	(Football Association of Singapore) Hougang United
29	MF	Joel Chew	9 February 2000 (age 26)	1	0	(Football Association of Singapore) Young Lions

=== Laos ===
Head coach: (Germany) Michael Weiß

No.	Pos.	Player	Date of birth (age)	Caps	Goals	Club
1	GK	Seeamphone Sengsavang	3 March 2001 (age 25)			(Lao Football Federation) Viengchanh
2	DF	Phoutthavong Sangvilay	16 October 2004 (age 22)			(Lao Football Federation) Ezra
3	DF	Anantaza Siphongphan	9 November 2004 (age 22)			(Lao Football Federation) Ezra
4	DF	Kaharn Phetsivilay^{OA}	9 September 1998 (age 28)			(Lao Football Federation) Young Elephant
5	DF	Phetdavanh Somsanith	24 April 2004 (age 22)			(Lao Football Federation) Champasak United
6	MF	Chanthavixay Khounthoumphone	17 February 2004 (age 22)			(Lao Football Federation) Savannakhet Province
8	MF	Phouvieng Phounsavath	12 November 2002 (age 24)			(Lao Football Federation) Champasak United
9	MF	Phithack Kongmathilath^{OA}	6 August 1996 (age 30)			(Football Association of Thailand) Nakhon Pathom United
10	MF	Phoutthasay Khochalern^{OA}	29 December 1995 (age 30)			(Football Association of Thailand) Samut Prakan City
11	FW	Chony Waenpaseuth	27 November 2002 (age 23)			(Lao Football Federation) Ezra
12	GK	Keo-Oudone Souvannasangso	19 June 2000 (age 26)			(Lao Football Federation) Lao Army
13	DF	Thanouthong Kietnalonglop	5 March 2001 (age 25)			(Lao Football Federation) Young Elephant
14	FW	Visith Bounpaserth	23 January 2002 (age 24)			(Lao Football Federation) Salavan Province
15	MF	Damoth Thongkhamsavath	3 April 2004 (age 22)			(Lao Football Federation) Champasak United
16	DF	At Viengkham	24 October 2000 (age 26)			(Lao Football Federation) Master 7
17	MF	Bounphachan Bounkong	29 September 2000 (age 26)			(Lao Football Federation) Young Elephant
19	DF	Nalongsit Chanthalangsy	3 December 2001 (age 24)			(Lao Football Federation) Champasak United
20	FW	Ekkamai Ratxachak	16 June 1999 (age 27)			(Lao Football Federation) Champasak United
21	FW	Phathana Phommathep	27 February 1999 (age 27)			(Lao Football Federation) Ezra
22	FW	Sinnakone Koumanykham	10 July 2003 (age 23)			(Lao Football Federation) Luang Prabang
