= 2022 AFF Championship squads =

Association football competition squads

Below are the squads for the 2022 AFF Championship, which took place between 20 December 2022 and 16 January 2023.

Ten national teams affiliated with ASEAN Football Federation (AFF) and participating in this tournament were required to register squads containing up to 23 players, including three goalkeepers. Only the players from the following squad list were allowed to appear in the tournament.

The age listed is the age of each player on 20 December 2022, the first day of the tournament. The number of appearances and goals listed for each player does not include the match played after the start of the 2022 AFF Championship. The club listed is the last club where the player concerned plays a competitive match before the tournament. Fold flag for each club according to the State Football Association (not league) the club is affiliated.

== Group A ==
=== Thailand ===
Head coach: (Brazil) Alexandré Pölking

The final 23-man squad for Thailand was announced on 17 December 2022.

No.	Pos.	Player	Date of birth (age)	Club
1	GK	Kampol Pathomakkakul	29 July 1992 (aged 30)	(Football Association of Thailand) Ratchaburi
2	DF	Sasalak Haiprakhon	8 January 1996 (aged 26)	(Football Association of Thailand) Buriram United
3	DF	Theerathon Bunmathan (captain)	6 February 1990 (aged 32)	(Football Association of Thailand) Buriram United
4	DF	Pansa Hemviboon	8 July 1990 (aged 32)	(Football Association of Thailand) Buriram United
5	DF	Chalermsak Aukkee	25 August 1994 (aged 28)	(Football Association of Thailand) Police Tero
6	MF	Sarach Yooyen	30 May 1992 (aged 30)	(Football Association of Thailand) BG Pathum United
7	MF	Sumanya Purisai	5 December 1986 (aged 36)	(Football Association of Thailand) Chonburi
8	MF	Peeradon Chamratsamee	15 September 1992 (aged 30)	(Football Association of Thailand) Buriram United
9	FW	Adisak Kraisorn	1 February 1991 (aged 31)	(Football Association of Thailand) Muangthong United
10	FW	Teerasil Dangda	6 June 1988 (aged 34)	(Football Association of Thailand) BG Pathum United
11	FW	Bordin Phala	20 December 1994 (aged 28)	(Football Association of Thailand) Port
12	MF	Kritsada Kaman	18 March 1999 (aged 23)	(Football Association of Thailand) Chonburi
13	FW	Jaroensak Wonggorn	18 May 1997 (aged 25)	(Football Association of Thailand) Muangthong United
14	MF	Sanrawat Dechmitr	3 August 1989 (aged 33)	(Football Association of Malaysia) Kedah Darul Aman
15	DF	Suphanan Bureerat	10 October 1993 (aged 29)	(Football Association of Thailand) Port
16	DF	Jakkapan Praisuwan	16 August 1994 (aged 28)	(Football Association of Thailand) BG Pathum United
17	MF	Ekanit Panya	21 October 1999 (aged 23)	(Football Association of Thailand) Muangthong United
18	MF	Weerathep Pomphan	19 September 1996 (aged 26)	(Football Association of Thailand) Muangthong United
19	DF	Chatmongkol Rueangthanarot	9 May 2002 (aged 20)	(Football Association of Thailand) Chonburi
20	GK	Kittipong Phuthawchueak	26 September 1989 (aged 33)	(Football Association of Thailand) BG Pathum United
21	FW	Poramet Arjvirai	20 July 1998 (aged 24)	(Football Association of Thailand) Muangthong United
22	MF	Channarong Promsrikaew	17 April 2001 (aged 21)	(Football Association of Thailand) Chonburi
23	GK	Saranon Anuin	24 March 1994 (aged 28)	(Football Association of Thailand) Chiangrai United

=== Philippines ===
Head coach: (Spain) Josep Ferré

The final 23-man squad for the Philippines was announced on 14 December 2022.

No.	Pos.	Player	Date of birth (age)	Club
1	GK	Kevin Ray Mendoza	29 September 1994 (aged 28)	(Football Association of Malaysia) Kuala Lumpur City
2	DF	Simen Lyngbø	18 February 1998 (aged 24)	(Philippine Football Federation) United City
3	DF	Paul Tabinas	5 July 2002 (aged 20)	(Japan Football Association) Iwate Grulla Morioka
4	DF	Jefferson Tabinas	7 August 1998 (aged 24)	(Japan Football Association) Mito HollyHock
5	DF	Kamil Amirul	16 February 2004 (aged 18)	(Philippine Football Federation) ADT
6	MF	Sandro Reyes	29 March 2003 (aged 19)	(Philippine Football Federation) Kaya–Iloilo
7	MF	Jesus Melliza	20 April 1992 (aged 30)	(Philippine Football Federation) Kaya–Iloilo
8	MF	Arnel Amita	10 January 1995 (aged 27)	(Philippine Football Federation) Kaya–Iloilo
9	FW	Kenshiro Daniels	13 January 1995 (aged 27)	(Philippine Football Federation) United City
10	FW	Oliver Bias	15 June 2001 (aged 21)	(Football Association of Thailand) Chiangmai United
11	FW	Yrick Gallantes	14 January 2001 (aged 21)	(Philippine Football Federation) ADT
12	DF	Amani Aguinaldo	24 April 1995 (aged 27)	(Football Association of Thailand) Nakhon Ratchasima
13	DF	Sebastian Rasmussen	17 June 2002 (aged 20)	(Danish Football Association) Randers Freja
14	FW	Jarvey Gayoso	11 February 1997 (aged 25)	(Philippine Football Federation) Kaya–Iloilo
15	GK	Anthony Pinthus	11 April 1998 (aged 24)	(Philippine Football Federation) United City
16	GK	Julian Schwarzer	26 October 1999 (aged 23)	(Philippine Football Federation) ADT
17	MF	Stephan Schröck (captain)	21 August 1986 (aged 36)	(Philippine Football Federation) ADT
18	DF	Christian Rontini	20 July 1999 (aged 23)	(Football Association of Malaysia) Penang
19	FW	Hikaru Minegishi	5 June 1991 (aged 31)	(Philippine Football Federation) United City
20	FW	Mark Hartmann	20 January 1992 (aged 30)	(Philippine Football Federation) United City
21	MF	Harry Nuñez	16 December 2004 (aged 18)	(Philippine Football Federation) ADT
22	DF	Pocholo Bugas	3 December 2001 (aged 21)	(Philippine Football Federation) United City
23	DF	Audie Menzi	11 October 1994 (aged 28)	(Philippine Football Federation) Kaya–Iloilo

=== Indonesia ===
Head coach: (South Korea) Shin Tae-yong

The final 23-man squad for Indonesia was announced on 19 December 2022.

No.	Pos.	Player	Date of birth (age)	Club
1	GK	Muhammad Riyandi	3 January 2000 (aged 22)	(Football Association of Indonesia) Persis Solo
2	FW	Yakob Sayuri	22 September 1997 (aged 25)	(Football Association of Indonesia) PSM Makassar
3	DF	Edo Febriansyah	25 July 1997 (aged 25)	(Football Association of Indonesia) RANS Nusantara
4	DF	Jordi Amat	21 March 1992 (aged 30)	(Football Association of Malaysia) Johor Darul Ta'zim
5	DF	Rizky Ridho	21 November 2001 (aged 21)	(Football Association of Indonesia) Persebaya Surabaya
6	MF	Marselino Ferdinan	9 September 2004 (aged 18)	(Football Association of Indonesia) Persebaya Surabaya
7	FW	Saddil Ramdani	2 January 1999 (aged 23)	(Football Association of Malaysia) Sabah
8	FW	Witan Sulaeman	8 October 2001 (aged 21)	(Slovak Football Association) AS Trenčín
9	FW	Ilija Spasojević	11 September 1987 (aged 35)	(Football Association of Indonesia) Bali United
10	FW	Egy Maulana Vikri	7 July 2000 (aged 22)	(Slovak Football Association) Zlaté Moravce
11	FW	Dendy Sulistyawan	26 October 1996 (aged 26)	(Football Association of Indonesia) Bhayangkara
12	DF	Pratama Arhan	21 December 2001 (aged 20)	(Japan Football Association) Tokyo Verdy
13	DF	Rachmat Irianto	3 September 1999 (aged 23)	(Football Association of Indonesia) Persib Bandung
14	DF	Asnawi Mangkualam	4 October 1999 (aged 23)	(Korea Football Association) Ansan Greeners
15	MF	Ricky Kambuaya	5 May 1996 (aged 26)	(Football Association of Indonesia) Persib Bandung
16	DF	Hansamu Yama	16 January 1995 (aged 27)	(Football Association of Indonesia) Persija Jakarta
17	MF	Syahrian Abimanyu	25 April 1999 (aged 23)	(Football Association of Indonesia) Persija Jakarta
18	FW	Muhammad Rafli	24 November 1998 (aged 24)	(Football Association of Indonesia) Arema
19	DF	Fachruddin Aryanto (captain)	19 February 1989 (aged 33)	(Football Association of Indonesia) Madura United
20	GK	Syahrul Trisna	26 November 1995 (aged 27)	(Football Association of Indonesia) Persikabo 1973
21	FW	Ramadhan Sananta	27 November 2002 (aged 20)	(Football Association of Indonesia) PSM Makassar
22	GK	Nadeo Argawinata	9 March 1997 (aged 25)	(Football Association of Indonesia) Bali United
23	MF	Marc Klok	20 April 1993 (aged 29)	(Football Association of Indonesia) Persib Bandung

=== Cambodia ===
Head coach: (Japan) Ryu Hirose (Note: Actual coaching duties are performed by Keisuke Honda.)

The final 23-man squad for Cambodia was announced on 20 December 2022.

No.	Pos.	Player	Date of birth (age)	Club
1	GK	Keo Soksela	1 August 1997 (aged 25)	(Football Federation of Cambodia) Visakha
2	DF	Taing Bunchhai	28 December 2002 (aged 19)	(Football Federation of Cambodia) Boeung Ket
3	DF	Choun Chanchav	5 May 1999 (aged 23)	(Football Federation of Cambodia) Phnom Penh Crown
4	DF	Tes Sambath	20 October 2000 (aged 22)	(Football Federation of Cambodia) Visakha
5	DF	Soeuy Visal (captain)	19 August 1995 (aged 27)	(Football Federation of Cambodia) Svay Rieng
6	MF	In Sodavid	2 July 1998 (aged 24)	(Football Federation of Cambodia) Visakha
7	FW	Lim Pisoth	29 August 2001 (aged 21)	(Football Federation of Cambodia) Phnom Penh Crown
8	MF	Orn Chanpolin	15 March 1998 (aged 24)	(Football Federation of Cambodia) Phnom Penh Crown
9	FW	Sieng Chanthea	9 September 2002 (aged 20)	(Football Federation of Cambodia) Boeung Ket
10	FW	Keo Sokpheng	3 March 1992 (aged 30)	(Football Federation of Cambodia) Visakha
11	FW	Mat Noron	17 June 1998 (aged 24)	(Football Federation of Cambodia) Boeung Ket
12	MF	Sos Suhana	4 April 1992 (aged 30)	(Football Federation of Cambodia) Nagaworld
13	DF	Sareth Krya	3 March 1996 (aged 26)	(Football Federation of Cambodia) Svay Rieng
14	FW	Nick Taylor	2 September 1998 (aged 24)	(United States Soccer Federation) Orlando City B
15	FW	Reung Bunheing	25 September 1992 (aged 30)	(Football Federation of Cambodia) Visakha
16	MF	Yeu Muslim	25 December 1998 (aged 23)	(Football Federation of Cambodia) Phnom Penh Crown
17	FW	Sa Ty	4 April 2002 (aged 20)	(Football Federation of Cambodia) Visakha
18	DF	Seut Baraing	29 September 1999 (aged 23)	(Football Federation of Cambodia) Phnom Penh Crown
19	DF	Cheng Meng	27 February 1998 (aged 24)	(Football Federation of Cambodia) Visakha
20	DF	Boris Kok	20 May 1991 (aged 31)	(Football Federation of Cambodia) Phnom Penh Crown
21	GK	Vireak Dara	30 October 2003 (aged 19)	(Football Federation of Cambodia) Visakha
22	GK	Hul Kimhuy	7 April 2000 (aged 22)	(Football Federation of Cambodia) Boeung Ket
23	MF	Thierry Chantha Bin	1 June 1991 (aged 31)	(Football Federation of Cambodia) Visakha

=== Brunei ===
Head coach: (Spain) Mario Rivera

The final 23-man squad for Brunei was announced on 10 December 2022.

No.	Pos.	Player	Date of birth (age)	Club
1	GK	Haimie Abdullah Nyaring	31 May 1998 (aged 24)	(Football Association of Brunei Darussalam) DPMM
2	DF	Alinur Rashimy Jufri	12 June 2000 (aged 22)	(Football Association of Brunei Darussalam) Kasuka
3	DF	Abdul Mu'iz Sisa	20 April 1991 (aged 31)	(Football Association of Brunei Darussalam) DPMM
4	DF	Fakharrazi Hassan	15 July 1989 (aged 33)	(Football Association of Brunei Darussalam) DPMM
5	MF	Nur Ikhwan Othman	15 January 1993 (aged 29)	(Football Association of Brunei Darussalam) DPMM
6	MF	Azwan Saleh	6 January 1988 (aged 34)	(Football Association of Brunei Darussalam) DPMM
7	MF	Azwan Ali Rahman	11 January 1992 (aged 30)	(Football Association of Brunei Darussalam) DPMM
8	FW	Nazirrudin Ismail	27 December 1998 (aged 23)	(Football Association of Brunei Darussalam) MS PPDB
9	FW	Abdul Azizi Ali Rahman	17 January 1987 (aged 35)	(Football Association of Brunei Darussalam) DPMM
10	FW	Adi Said	15 October 1990 (aged 32)	(Football Association of Brunei Darussalam) Kasuka
11	MF	Najib Tarif	5 February 1988 (aged 34)	(Football Association of Brunei Darussalam) DPMM
12	DF	Khairil Shahme Suhaimi	16 April 1993 (aged 29)	(Football Association of Brunei Darussalam) Kasuka
13	FW	Haziq Kasyful Azim	24 December 1998 (aged 23)	(Football Association of Brunei Darussalam) Kasuka
14	FW	Hamizan Aziz Sulaiman	24 January 1989 (aged 33)	(Football Association of Brunei Darussalam) Indera SC
15	MF	Hendra Azam Idris (captain)	10 August 1988 (aged 34)	(Football Association of Brunei Darussalam) DPMM
16	DF	Yura Indera Putera	25 March 1996 (aged 26)	(Football Association of Brunei Darussalam) DPMM
17	DF	Wafi Aminuddin	20 September 2000 (aged 22)	(Football Association of Brunei Darussalam) DPMM
18	GK	Ishyra Asmin Jabidi	9 July 1998 (aged 24)	(Football Association of Brunei Darussalam) MS ABDB
19	DF	Hanif Hamir	22 February 1997 (aged 25)	(Football Association of Brunei Darussalam) DPMM
20	GK	Jefri Syafiq Ishak	21 May 2002 (aged 20)	(Football Association of Brunei Darussalam) Kuala Belait
21	FW	Razimie Ramlli	6 August 1990 (aged 32)	(Football Association of Brunei Darussalam) DPMM
22	FW	Shafie Effendy	4 August 1995 (aged 27)	(Football Association of Brunei Darussalam) MS ABDB
23	FW	Hakeme Yazid Said	8 February 2003 (aged 19)	(Football Association of Brunei Darussalam) DPMM

== Group B ==
=== Vietnam ===
Head coach: (South Korea) Park Hang-seo

The final 23-man squad for Vietnam was announced on 20 December 2022.

No.	Pos.	Player	Date of birth (age)	Club
1	GK	Trần Nguyên Mạnh	20 December 1991 (aged 31)	(Vietnam Football Federation) Viettel
2	DF	Đỗ Duy Mạnh	29 September 1996 (aged 26)	(Vietnam Football Federation) Hà Nội
3	DF	Quế Ngọc Hải	15 May 1993 (aged 29)	(Vietnam Football Federation) Sông Lam Nghệ An
4	DF	Bùi Tiến Dũng	2 October 1995 (aged 27)	(Vietnam Football Federation) Viettel
5	DF	Đoàn Văn Hậu	19 April 1999 (aged 23)	(Vietnam Football Federation) Hà Nội
6	DF	Nguyễn Thanh Bình	2 November 2000 (aged 22)	(Vietnam Football Federation) Viettel
7	DF	Nguyễn Phong Hồng Duy	13 June 1996 (aged 26)	(Vietnam Football Federation) Hoàng Anh Gia Lai
8	MF	Đỗ Hùng Dũng (captain)	8 September 1993 (aged 29)	(Vietnam Football Federation) Hà Nội
9	FW	Nguyễn Văn Toàn	12 April 1996 (aged 26)	(Vietnam Football Federation) Hoàng Anh Gia Lai
10	FW	Nguyễn Văn Quyết	1 July 1991 (aged 31)	(Vietnam Football Federation) Hà Nội
11	MF	Nguyễn Tuấn Anh	16 May 1995 (aged 27)	(Vietnam Football Federation) Hoàng Anh Gia Lai
12	DF	Bùi Hoàng Việt Anh	1 January 1999 (aged 23)	(Vietnam Football Federation) Hà Nội
13	DF	Hồ Tấn Tài	6 November 1997 (aged 25)	(Vietnam Football Federation) Topenland Bình Định
14	MF	Nguyễn Hoàng Đức	11 January 1998 (aged 24)	(Vietnam Football Federation) Viettel
15	MF	Châu Ngọc Quang	1 February 1996 (aged 26)	(Vietnam Football Federation) Hải Phòng
16	DF	Nguyễn Thành Chung	8 September 1997 (aged 25)	(Vietnam Football Federation) Hà Nội
17	DF	Vũ Văn Thanh	14 April 1996 (aged 26)	(Vietnam Football Federation) Hoàng Anh Gia Lai
18	FW	Phạm Tuấn Hải	19 May 1998 (aged 24)	(Vietnam Football Federation) Hà Nội
19	MF	Nguyễn Quang Hải	12 April 1997 (aged 25)	(French Football Federation) Pau
20	FW	Phan Văn Đức	11 April 1996 (aged 26)	(Vietnam Football Federation) Sông Lam Nghệ An
21	GK	Nguyễn Văn Toản	26 November 1999 (aged 23)	(Vietnam Football Federation) Hải Phòng
22	FW	Nguyễn Tiến Linh	20 October 1997 (aged 25)	(Vietnam Football Federation) Becamex Bình Dương
23	GK	Đặng Văn Lâm	13 August 1993 (aged 29)	(Vietnam Football Federation) Topenland Bình Định

=== Malaysia ===
Head coach: (South Korea) Kim Pan-gon

The final 23-man squad for Malaysia was announced on 16 December 2022.

No.	Pos.	Player	Date of birth (age)	Club
1	GK	Kalamullah Al-Hafiz	30 July 1995 (aged 27)	(Football Association of Malaysia) Petaling Jaya City
2	DF	Azam Azmi	12 February 2001 (aged 21)	(Football Association of Malaysia) Terengganu
3	DF	Quentin Cheng	20 November 1999 (aged 23)	(Football Association of Malaysia) Selangor
4	DF	V. Ruventhiran	24 August 2001 (aged 21)	(Football Association of Malaysia) Selangor
5	DF	Sharul Nazeem	16 November 1999 (aged 23)	(Football Association of Malaysia) Selangor
6	DF	Dominic Tan	12 March 1997 (aged 25)	(Football Association of Malaysia) Sabah
7	FW	Faisal Halim	7 January 1998 (aged 24)	(Football Association of Malaysia) Selangor
8	MF	Stuart Wilkin	12 March 1998 (aged 24)	(Football Association of Malaysia) Sabah
9	FW	Darren Lok	18 September 1991 (aged 31)	(Football Association of Malaysia) Petaling Jaya City
10	MF	Lee Tuck	30 June 1988 (aged 34)	(Football Association of Malaysia) Sri Pahang
11	FW	Safawi Rasid (captain)	5 March 1997 (aged 25)	(Football Association of Thailand) Ratchaburi
12	DF	Fazly Mazlan	22 December 1993 (aged 28)	(Football Association of Malaysia) Selangor
13	FW	Hakim Hassan	2 October 1991 (aged 31)	(Football Association of Malaysia) Selangor
14	MF	Mukhairi Ajmal	7 November 2001 (aged 21)	(Football Association of Malaysia) Selangor
15	DF	Khuzaimi Piee	11 November 1993 (aged 29)	(Football Association of Malaysia) Negeri Sembilan
16	GK	Syihan Hazmi	26 February 1996 (aged 26)	(Football Association of Malaysia) Negeri Sembilan
17	MF	David Rowley	6 February 1990 (aged 32)	(Football Association of Malaysia) Sri Pahang
18	MF	Brendan Gan	3 June 1988 (aged 34)	(Football Association of Malaysia) Selangor
19	FW	Ezequiel Agüero	7 April 1994 (aged 28)	(Football Association of Malaysia) Sri Pahang
20	FW	Shamie Iszuan	10 September 1995 (aged 27)	(Football Association of Malaysia) Sarawak United
21	MF	Aliff Haiqal	11 July 2000 (aged 22)	(Football Association of Malaysia) Selangor
22	FW	Haqimi Azim	6 January 2003 (aged 19)	(Football Association of Malaysia) Kuala Lumpur City
23	GK	Rahadiazli Rahalim	28 May 2001 (aged 21)	(Football Association of Malaysia) Terengganu

=== Singapore ===
Head coach: (Japan) Takayuki Nishigaya

The final 23-man squad for Singapore was announced on 20 December 2022.

No.	Pos.	Player	Date of birth (age)	Club
1	GK	Syazwan Buhari	22 September 1992 (aged 30)	(Football Association of Singapore) Tampines Rovers
2	DF	Shakir Hamzah	20 October 1992 (aged 30)	(Football Association of Singapore) Tanjong Pagar
3	MF	Hami Syahin	16 December 1998 (aged 24)	(Football Association of Singapore) Lion City Sailors
4	DF	Nazrul Nazari	11 February 1991 (aged 31)	(Football Association of Singapore) Hougang United
5	DF	Amirul Adli	13 January 1996 (aged 26)	(Football Association of Singapore) Lion City Sailors
6	MF	Anumanthan Kumar	14 July 1994 (aged 28)	(Football Association of Singapore) Lion City Sailors
7	MF	Song Ui-young	8 November 1993 (aged 29)	(Football Association of Singapore) Lion City Sailors
8	MF	Shahdan Sulaiman	9 May 1988 (aged 34)	(Football Association of Singapore) Lion City Sailors
9	FW	Amy Recha	13 May 1992 (aged 30)	(Football Association of Singapore) Hougang United
10	FW	Faris Ramli	24 August 1992 (aged 30)	(Football Association of Singapore) Lion City Sailors
11	DF	Hafiz Nor	22 August 1988 (aged 34)	(Football Association of Singapore) Lion City Sailors
12	GK	Zaiful Nizam	24 July 1987 (aged 35)	(Football Association of Singapore) Geylang International
13	DF	Farhan Zulkifli	10 November 2002 (aged 20)	(Football Association of Singapore) Hougang United
14	DF	Hariss Harun (captain)	19 November 1990 (aged 32)	(Football Association of Singapore) Lion City Sailors
15	MF	Shah Shahiran	14 November 1999 (aged 23)	(Football Association of Singapore) Young Lions
16	DF	Ryhan Stewart	15 February 2000 (aged 22)	(Football Association of Thailand) Chiangmai
17	DF	Irfan Fandi	13 August 1997 (aged 25)	(Football Association of Thailand) BG Pathum United
18	GK	Hassan Sunny	2 April 1984 (aged 38)	(Football Association of Singapore) Albirex Niigata (S)
19	FW	Ilhan Fandi	8 November 2002 (aged 20)	(Football Association of Singapore) Albirex Niigata (S)
20	FW	Shawal Anuar	29 April 1991 (aged 31)	(Football Association of Singapore) Hougang United
21	MF	Joshua Pereira	10 October 1997 (aged 25)	(Football Association of Singapore) Geylang International
22	DF	Christopher van Huizen	28 November 1992 (aged 30)	(Football Association of Singapore) Tampines Rovers
23	MF	Zulfahmi Arifin	5 October 1991 (aged 31)	(Football Association of Singapore) Hougang United

=== Myanmar ===
Head coach: (Germany) Antoine Hey

The final 23-man squad for Myanmar was announced on 19 December 2022.

No.	Pos.	Player	Date of birth (age)	Club
1	GK	Myo Min Latt	20 February 1995 (aged 27)	(Football Association of Thailand) Ratchaburi
2	DF	Hein Phyo Win	19 September 1998 (aged 24)	(Football Association of Thailand) Ratchaburi
3	DF	Ye Min Thu	18 February 1998 (aged 24)	(Myanmar Football Federation) Shan United
4	DF	David Htan	13 May 1988 (aged 34)	(Myanmar Football Federation) Yangon United
5	DF	Nanda Kyaw	3 September 1996 (aged 26)	(Myanmar Football Federation) Shan United
6	MF	Kyaw Min Oo	16 May 1996 (aged 26)	(Myanmar Football Federation) Yangon United
7	MF	Lwin Moe Aung	10 December 1999 (aged 23)	(Football Association of Thailand) Rayong
8	FW	Hein Htet Aung	5 October 2001 (aged 21)	(Football Association of Malaysia) Selangor
9	FW	Aung Kaung Mann	18 February 1998 (aged 24)	(Football Association of Thailand) Udon Thani
10	FW	Win Naing Tun	3 May 2000 (aged 22)	(Myanmar Football Federation) Yangon United
11	FW	Maung Maung Lwin (captain)	18 June 1995 (aged 27)	(Football Association of Thailand) Lamphun Warriors
12	DF	Kyaw Zin Lwin	4 January 1993 (aged 29)	(Myanmar Football Federation) Shan United
13	MF	Lin Htet Soe	18 February 1998 (aged 24)	(Myanmar Football Federation) ISPE
14	MF	Wai Lin Aung	30 July 1999 (aged 23)	(Myanmar Football Federation) ISPE
15	DF	Win Moe Kyaw	9 October 1996 (aged 26)	(Myanmar Football Federation) Hantharwady United
16	MF	Yan Naing Oo	31 March 1996 (aged 26)	(Myanmar Football Federation) Yangon United
17	DF	Thiha Htet Aung	13 March 1996 (aged 26)	(Myanmar Football Federation) Yangon United
18	GK	Kyaw Zin Phyo	1 February 1993 (aged 29)	(Myanmar Football Federation) Shan United
19	FW	Ye Yint Aung	22 March 2000 (aged 22)	(Myanmar Football Federation) Yadanarbon
20	MF	Aung Naing Win	1 June 1997 (aged 25)	(Myanmar Football Federation) Ayeyawady United
21	MF	Myat Kaung Khant	15 July 2000 (aged 22)	(Myanmar Football Federation) Shan United
22	DF	Hein Zeyar Lin	8 December 2000 (aged 22)	(Myanmar Football Federation) Yangon United
23	GK	Tun Nanda Oo	14 August 1999 (aged 23)	(Myanmar Football Federation) Myawady

=== Laos ===
Head coach: (Germany) Michael Weiß

The final 23-man squad for Laos was announced on 21 December 2022.

No.	Pos.	Player	Date of birth (age)	Club
1	GK	Phounin Xayyasone	10 January 2004 (aged 18)	(Lao Football Federation) Ezra
2	DF	Phoutthavong Sangvilay	16 October 2004 (aged 18)	(Lao Football Federation) Ezra
3	DF	Phonsack Seesavath	4 October 2004 (aged 18)	(Lao Football Federation) Ezra
4	DF	Anantaza Siphongphan	9 November 2004 (aged 18)	(Lao Football Federation) Ezra
5	FW	Phathana Phommathep	27 February 1999 (aged 23)	(Lao Football Federation) Ezra
6	MF	Chanthavixay Khounthoumphone	17 February 2004 (aged 18)	(Lao Football Federation) Champasak
7	MF	Anousone Xaypanya	16 December 2002 (aged 20)	(Lao Football Federation) Ezra
8	MF	Manolom Phetphakdy	28 December 1991 (aged 30)	(Lao Football Federation) Young Elephants
9	FW	Kydavone Souvanny	22 December 1999 (aged 22)	(Lao Football Federation) Young Elephants
10	FW	Billy Ketkeophomphone	24 March 1990 (aged 32)	Free agent
11	FW	Soukphachan Lueanthala	24 August 2002 (aged 20)	(Lao Football Federation) Champasak
12	GK	Keo-Oudone Souvannasangso	19 June 2000 (aged 22)	(Lao Football Federation) Lao Army
13	DF	Inthachak Sisouphan	21 May 2001 (aged 21)	(Lao Football Federation) Luang Prabang
14	DF	Oun Phetvongsa	29 September 2003 (aged 19)	(Lao Football Federation) Ezra
15	FW	Chony Waenpaseuth	27 November 2002 (aged 20)	(Lao Football Federation) Ezra
16	DF	Kaharn Phetsivilay	9 September 1998 (aged 24)	(Lao Football Federation) Young Elephants
17	FW	Soukaphone Vongchiengkham (captain)	9 March 1992 (aged 30)	(Football Association of Thailand) Trat
18	GK	Xaysavath Souvanhansok	3 September 1999 (aged 23)	(Lao Football Federation) Young Elephants
19	DF	Nalongsit Chanthalangsy	3 December 2001 (aged 21)	(Lao Football Federation) Champasak
20	FW	Ekkamai Ratxachak	16 July 1999 (aged 23)	(Lao Football Federation) Champasak
21	MF	Phithack Kongmathilath	26 August 1996 (aged 26)	(Football Association of Thailand) Nakhon Pathom United
22	MF	Phouvieng Phounsavath	12 December 2002 (aged 20)	(Lao Football Federation) Viengchanh
23	DF	At Viengkham	24 October 2000 (aged 22)	(Lao Football Federation) Master 7

== Statistics ==
Note: Only the final squad list of each national team is taken into consideration.

=== Age ===
==== Outfield players ====
- Oldest: (Philippines) Stephan Schröck (36 years, 121 days)
- Youngest: (Philippines) Harry Nuñez (18 years, 4 days)

==== Goalkeepers ====
- Oldest: (Singapore) Hassan Sunny (38 years, 262 days)
- Youngest: (Laos) Phounin Xayyasone (18 years, 344 days)

==== Captains ====
- Oldest: (Philippines) Stephan Schröck (36 years, 121 days)
- Youngest: (Malaysia) Safawi Rasid (25 years, 290 days)

==== Coaches ====
- Oldest: (Japan) Ryu Hirose (Cambodia) (66 years, 245 days)
- Youngest: (Spain) Josep Ferré (Philippines) (39 years, 24 days)

=== Player representation by league system ===
Nations in bold were represented at the tournament.

Country	Players	Percentage	Outside national squad	Lower tier players
**Thailand**	32	13.04%	10	6
**Malaysia**	27	11.74%	5	0
**Brunei**	23	10.00%	0	0
**Cambodia**	22	9.57%	0	0
**Vietnam**	22	9.57%	0	0
**Laos**	20	8.70%	0	0
**Singapore** (Note: Includes players from Albirex Niigata Singapore, which are Japanese club based in Singapore and play in the Singapore league system.)	21	9.13%	0	0
**Indonesia**	17	7.39%	0	0
**Myanmar**	17	7.39%	0	0
**Philippines**	16	6.96%	0	0
Japan	4	1.74%	4	4
Slovakia	2	0.87%	2	0
Denmark	1	0.43%	1	1
France	1	0.43%	1	1
South Korea	1	0.43%	1	1
United States	1	0.43%	1	1
**Total**	**230**	**100%**	**24 (10.43%)**	**13 (5.65%)**

- The Brunei squad was made up entirely of players from the country's domestic league.
- Hassan Sunny of Singapore played for Albirex Niigata Singapore, a Japanese club playing in the Singapore Premier League.
- Three teams had only one foreign-based player (Cambodia, Malaysia and Vietnam).
- The Myanmar squad had the most players from a single foreign federation, with five players playing for Thai clubs.
- Of the countries not represented by a national team at the tournament, Japan provided the most players with three.
- Six players in Thailand's second-tier Thai League 2 represented their countries at the tournament. None of them were Thais.
- The lowest league on a domestic pyramid to have a representative player at the tournament was the Japanese third-tier J3 League. It was represented by the Philippines' Paul Tabinas (Iwate Grulla Morioka).

=== Player representation by club ===
Players	Clubs
14	(Brunei) DPMM
10	(Malaysia) Selangor

Clubs with fewer than 10 players:
Players	Clubs
9	(Cambodia) Visakha (Laos) Ezra (Singapore) Lion City Sailors
7	(Vietnam) Hanoi
6	(Cambodia) Phnom Penh Crown (Myanmar) Yangon United (Philippines) United City
5	(Myanmar) Shan United (Philippines) ADT (Philippines) Kaya–Iloilo (Singapore) Hougang United (Thailand) BG Pathum United (Thailand) Muangthong United
4	(Cambodia) Boeung Ket Angkor (Laos) Young Elephants (Thailand) Buriram United (Thailand) Chonburi (Thailand) Ratchaburi (Vietnam) Hoang Anh Gia Lai (Vietnam) Viettel
3	(Brunei) Kasuka (Indonesia) Persib Bandung (Laos) Champasak (Malaysia) Petaling Jaya City (Malaysia) Sabah (Malaysia) Sri Pahang (Malaysia) Terengganu
2	(Brunei) MS ABDB (Cambodia) Preah Khan Reach Svay Rieng (Indonesia) Bali United (Indonesia) Persebaya Surabaya (Indonesia) Persija Jakarta (Indonesia) PSM Makassar (Malaysia) Kuala Lumpur City (Malaysia) Negeri Sembilan (Myanmar) ISPE (Singapore) Albirex Niigata (S) (Singapore) Geylang International (Singapore) Tampines Rovers (Thailand) Port (Vietnam) Hai Phong (Vietnam) Song Lam Nghe An (Vietnam) Topenland Binh Dinh
1	(Brunei) Indera (Brunei) Kota Ranger (Brunei) Kuala Belait (Brunei) MS PPDB (Cambodia) Nagaworld (Denmark) Randers Freja (France) Pau (Indonesia) Arema (Indonesia) Bhayangkara (Indonesia) Madura United (Indonesia) Persikabo 1973 (Indonesia) Persis Solo (Indonesia) RANS Nusantara (Japan) Iwate Grulla Morioka (Japan) Mito HollyHock (Japan) Tokyo Verdy (Laos) Lao Army (Laos) Luang Prabang (Laos) Master 7 (Laos) Viengchanh (Malaysia) Johor Darul Ta'zim (Malaysia) Kedah Darul Aman (Malaysia) Penang (Malaysia) Sarawak United (Myanmar) Ayeyawady United (Myanmar) Hantharwady United (Myanmar) Myawady (Myanmar) Yadanarbon (Singapore) Tanjong Pagar United (Singapore) Young Lions (Slovakia) AS Trenčín (Slovakia) Zlaté Moravce (South Korea) Ansan Greeners (Thailand) Chiangmai (Thailand) Chiangrai United (Thailand) Lamphun Warriors (Thailand) Nakhon Pathom United (Thailand) Nakhon Ratchasima (Thailand) Police Tero (Thailand) Rayong (Thailand) Trat (Thailand) Udon Thani (United States) Orlando City B (Vietnam) Becamex Binh Duong

=== Player representation by country confederation ===
Confederation	Players	Percentage
AFC	224	97.39%
UEFA	4	1.74%
CONCACAF	1	0.43%

=== Average age of squads ===
Average age	Country
28.6	Singapore
28.3	Thailand
27.9	Brunei
26	Vietnam
25.9	Malaysia
25	Myanmar
24.7	Indonesia
24.6	Philippines
24.4	Cambodia
22.1	Laos

=== Coaches representation by country ===
Coaches in bold represented their own country.

Number	Country	Coaches
3	South Korea	Kim Pan-gon (Malaysia), Park Hang-seo (Vietnam), Shin Tae-yong (Indonesia)
2	Germany	Antoine Hey (Myanmar), Michael Weiß (Laos)
2	Japan	Ryu Hirose (Cambodia), Takayuki Nishigaya (Singapore)
2	Spain	Josep Ferré (Philippines), Mario Rivera (Brunei)
1	Brazil	Alexandré Pölking (Thailand)
