= Alfeandra Dewangga =

Indonesian footballer (born 2001)

Personal information
- Full name: Alfeandra Dewangga Santosa
- Date of birth: 28 June 2001 (age 25)
- Place of birth: Semarang, Indonesia
- Height: 1.80 m (5 ft 11 in)
- Positions: Defensive midfielder; defender

Team information
- Current team: Arema
- Number: 85

Youth career
- 2018–2019: PPLP Jateng
- 2019–2020: PSIS Semarang

Senior career*
Years	Team	Apps	(Gls)
2020–2025	PSIS Semarang	94	(5)
2025–2026	Persib Bandung	9	(0)
2026–	Arema	3	(0)

International career
2019	Indonesia U19	7	(0)
2021–2024	Indonesia U23	25	(0)
2021–2023	Indonesia	15	(0)
Medal record
Men's football
Representing Indonesia
AFF U-19 Youth Championship
Third place	2019 Vietnam
Southeast Asian Games
Gold medal – first place	2023 Cambodia	Team
Bronze medal – third place	2021 Vietnam	Team
AFF U-23 Championship
Runner-up	2023 Thailand	Team
AFF Championship
Runner-up	2020 Singapore	Team
- * Club domestic league appearances and goals as of 31 October 2026

Alfeandra Dewangga Santosa (born 28 June 2001) is an Indonesian professional footballer for Super League club Arema. His main position is a defensive midfielder, he can also play as a centre-back or left-back.

== Club career ==
=== PSIS Semarang ===
Dewangga made his first-team debut on 7 March 2020 as a substitute in a match against Persela Lamongan at the Surajaya Stadium, Lamongan. This season was suspended on 27 March 2020 due to the COVID-19 pandemic. The season was abandoned and was declared void on 20 January 2021.

Dewangga made his debut of the new league season match against Persela Lamongan on 4 September 2021 as a substitute for Rio Saputro in the 46th minute. Dewangga scored his first league goal from a free-kick in injury time 93rd minute, against Bhayangkara on 12 March 2022.

On 29 March 2023, he scored his first goal of the 2022–23 season, scoring in a 1–2 lose over Persebaya Surabaya at the Jatidiri Stadium.

=== Persib Bandung ===
On 26 June 2025, Dewangga joined with the reigning Liga 1 champion, Persib Bandung.

== International career ==
Dewangga debuted in an Indonesia U19 when he was starting against the Philippines U19 in the 2019 AFF U-18 Youth Championship. And brought the U19 team to third place in the championship after winning 5–0 in a match against Myanmar U19.

In October 2021, Dewangga was called up to the Indonesia U23 in a friendly match against Tajikistan U23 and Nepal U23 and also prepared for the 2022 AFC U-23 Asian Cup qualification in Tajikistan by Shin Tae-yong. On 19 October 2021, Dewangga debuted in the U23 team when he came as a starter in a 2–1 win against Tajikistan U23 in a friendly match.

=== Senior ===
In November 2021, Indonesian coach, Shin Tae-yong sent Dewangga his first call up to the full national side, for the friendly matches in Turkey against Afghanistan and Myanmar. He made his official international debut on 25 November 2021, against Myanmar in a friendly match in Antalya, Turkey. On 15 December 2021, Dewangga came out as the best player in a 0–0 draw against Vietnam on the third matchday of Group B of the 2020 AFF Championship.

== Career statistics ==
=== Club ===
As of 3 November 2026

Club	Season	League			Cup		League cup		Continental		Other		Total	
Club	Season	Division	Apps	Goals	Apps	Goals	Apps	Goals	Apps	Goals	Apps	Goals	Apps	Goals
PSIS Semarang	2020	Liga 1	2	0	–		–		–		0	0	2	0
PSIS Semarang	2021–22	Liga 1	17	1	–		–		–		4 (Note: Appearances in Menpora Cup.)	0	21	1
PSIS Semarang	2022–23	Liga 1	23	1	–		–		–		5 (Note: Appearance(s) in Piala Presiden)	1	28	2
PSIS Semarang	2023–24	Liga 1	26	2	–		–		–		0	0	26	2
PSIS Semarang	2024–25	Liga 1	26	1	–		–		–		0	0	26	1
PSIS Semarang	Total		94	5	–		–		–		9	1	103	6
Persib Bandung	2025–26	Super League	9	0	–		–		3 (Note: Appearance(s) in AFC Champions League Two)	0	1	0	13	0
Arema	2026–27	Super League	3	0	–		1	0	–		4	0	8	0
Career total			106	5	0	0	1	0	3	0	14	1	124	6

=== International ===
As of match played 8 September 2023

Appearances and goals by national team and year
National team	Year	Apps	Goals
Indonesia	2021	8	0
Indonesia	2022	6	0
Indonesia	2023	1	0
Total		15	0

== Honours ==
=== Club ===
Persib Bandung

- Super League: 2025–26

=== International ===
Indonesia U-19

- AFF U-19 Youth Championship third place: 2019

Indonesia U-23

- SEA Games gold medal: 2023; bronze medal: 2021
- AFF U-23 Championship runner-up: 2023
- AFC U-23 Asian Cup fourth-place: 2024

Indonesia

- AFF Championship runner-up: 2020

Individual

- 2020 AFF Championship: Team of the Tournament
