= Ken Chansopheak =

Cambodian footballer

Ken Chansopheak កែន ចាន់សុភាក់
Personal information
- Full name: Ken Chansopheak
- Date of birth: June 15, 1998 (age 28)
- Place of birth: Takéo, Cambodia
- Height: 1.68 m (5 ft 6 in)
- Position: Right back

Team information
- Current team: Visakha
- Number: 25

Youth career
- 2011–2016: Phnom Penh Crown

Senior career*
Years	Team	Apps	(Gls)
2016–2019	Phnom Penh Crown		
2019–	Visakha		

International career
2019	Cambodia U23		
2019–2022	Cambodia	16	(0)
- * Club domestic league appearances and goals

Ken Chansopheak (born 15 June 1998) is a Cambodian professional footballer who plays as a right back for Cambodian Premier League club Visakha and the Cambodia national team.

== Club career ==
Ken Chansopheak made his senior debut in the Cambodian League in 2019 For Visakha.

== International career ==
Ken Chansopheak made his junior international debut in the 2020 AFC U-23 Championship qualification against Australia national under-23 soccer team on 22 March 2019.
