= Taing Bunchhai =

Cambodian footballer (born 2002)

Personal information
- Full name: Taing Bunchhai
- Date of birth: 28 December 2002 (age 23)
- Place of birth: Phnom Penh, Cambodia
- Height: 1.72 m (5 ft 8 in)
- Positions: Centre back; right back

Team information
- Current team: Boeung Ket
- Number: 23

Youth career
- –2021: Bati Academy

Senior career*
Years	Team	Apps	(Gls)
2021–	Boeung Ket	106	(5)

International career^{‡}
2022–2023	Cambodia U23	6	(0)
2022–	Cambodia	3	(0)
- * Club domestic league appearances and goals as of 9 November 2026 ‡ National team caps and goals as of 20 December 2022

Taing Bunchhai (born 28 December 2002) is a Cambodian professional footballer who plays as a centre back or a right back for Cambodian Premier League club Boeung Ket and the Cambodia national team.
