= Nhean Sosidan =

Cambodian footballer

Personal information
- Full name: Nhean Sosidan
- Date of birth: 11 October 2002 (age 24)
- Place of birth: Svay Rieng, Cambodia
- Height: 1.65 m (5 ft 5 in)
- Positions: Attacking midfielder; right winger

Team information
- Current team: Preah Khan Reach Svay Rieng
- Number: 10

Senior career*
Years	Team	Apps	(Gls)
2021–2024	Tiffy Army	44	(14)
2024–	Preah Khan Reach Svay Rieng	58	(16)

International career^{‡}
2021–2023	Cambodia U23	3	(1)
2021–	Cambodia	19	(1)
Medal record
Men's football
Representing Cambodia
FIFA ASEAN Challenge Cup
Runner-up	2026 Hong Kong
- * Club domestic league appearances and goals as of 26 October 2026 ‡ National team caps and goals as of 5 October 2026

Nhean Sosidan (born 11 October 2002) is a Cambodian professional footballer who plays as an attacking midfielder or a forward for Cambodian Premier League club Preah Khan Reach Svay Rieng and the Cambodia national team.

== Club career ==
For the 2021 season, Sosidan began playing for the senior team of National Defense Ministry FC of the Cambodian C-League. That year he scored his first goal for the club on 14 July 2021 in a league match against Prey Veng FC after coming on as a 77th-minute substitute. That season he was called one of Cambodia's rising stars by Jose Rodriguez T. Senase of the Khmer Times.

== International career ==
In late September 2021 Sosidan was named to Ryu Hirose's squad for two 2023 AFC Asian Cup qualification play-off matches against Guam and for 2022 AFC U-23 Asian Cup qualification, both of which were scheduled for the following month. He went on to make his senior international debut on 12 October 2021 in the second-leg match against Guam, coming on as a second-half substitute for Lim Pisoth.

Sosidan scored his first senior international goal on 10 September 2024 in a 2027 AFC Asian Cup qualification match against Sri Lanka at the Olympic Stadium.

=== International career statistics ===
As of match played 10 September 2024

Cambodia national team
Year	Apps	Goals
2021	3	0
2024	5	1
Total	8	1

=== International goals ===
==== U23 ====
No.	Date	Venue	Opponent	Score	Result	Competition
1.	14 February 2022	Morodok Techo National Stadium, Phnom Penh, Cambodia	Brunei	2–0	6–0	2022 AFF U-23 Youth Championship

==== International goals ====
No.	Date	Venue	Opponent	Score	Result	Competition
1.	10 September 2024	Olympic Stadium, Phnom Penh, Cambodia	Sri Lanka	1–1	2–2 (a.e.t.); 2–4 (p)	2027 AFC Asian Cup qualification
