= Leng Nora =

Cambodian footballer

Personal information
- Full name: Leng Nora
- Date of birth: 19 September 2004 (age 22)
- Place of birth: Phnom Penh, Cambodia
- Height: 1.66 m (5 ft 5 in)
- Positions: Left back; left winger

Team information
- Current team: Visakha
- Number: 99

Youth career
- 2018–2021: Visakha

Senior career*
Years	Team	Apps	(Gls)
2021	Prey Veng	16	(1)
2022–	Visakha	89	(5)

International career^{‡}
2019	Cambodia U15		
2021–2025	Cambodia U23		
2021–	Cambodia	6	(0)
- * Club domestic league appearances and goals as of 13:12, 9 November 2026 (UTC) ‡ National team caps and goals as of 10 June 2026

Leng Nora (Khmer: ឡេង ណូរ៉ា [ˈleːŋ ˌnoːraː]; born 19 September 2004) is a Cambodian professional footballer who plays as a left back or a left winger for Cambodian Premier League club Visakha and the Cambodia national team.

== Personal life ==
Nora was born in Phnom Penh. He is of Ghanaian descent.

== Career statistics ==
=== International ===
As of matches played 19 December 2021.

National team	Year	Apps	Goals
Cambodia	2021	3	0
Total		3	0
