= Chan Sarapich =

Cambodian footballer

Personal information
- Date of birth: 5 April 2002 (age 24)
- Place of birth: Sihanoukville, Cambodia
- Height: 1.65 m (5 ft 5 in)
- Position: Right-back

Team information
- Current team: Visakha
- Number: 26

Youth career
- 2017: Sihanoukviile Football School
- 2018–2020: Visakha

Senior career*
Years	Team	Apps	(Gls)
2020–2022	Prey Veng		
2023–	Visakha	1	(0)
2023–2024	→ Prey Veng (Loan)	23	(0)
2024–2025	→ Life Sihanoukville (Loan)	19	(0)

International career
2020	Cambodia U20	1	(0)
2022–2023	Cambodia U23	10	(0)
2021	Cambodia	1	(0)
- * Club domestic league appearances and goals as of 11 May 2026

Chan Sarapich (born 5 April 2002) is a Cambodian professional footballer who plays as a right-back for Cambodian Premier League club Visakha and the Cambodia national team.
