= Yue Safy =

Cambodian footballer

Yue Safy យ៉ឺ សាហ្វី
Personal information
- Full name: Yue Safy
- Date of birth: 8 November 2000 (age 26)
- Place of birth: Kandal, Cambodia
- Height: 1.76 m (5 ft 9 in)
- Positions: Centre-back; right-back

Youth career
- 2013–2016: Phnom Penh Crown

Senior career*
Years	Team	Apps	(Gls)
2016–2025	Phnom Penh Crown		
2024–2025	→ Tiffy Army (loan)	13	(0)

International career
2016	Cambodia U16		
2016–2017	Cambodia U19	5	(0)
2019–2023	Cambodia U23		
2019–2021	Cambodia	6	(1)
- * Club domestic league appearances and goals as of 20 April 2025

Yue Safy (born 8 November 2000) is a Cambodian professional footballer who plays as a centre-back or a right-back.

== Personal life ==
Born in Kandal, Yeu is a Cambodian Muslim.

== Club career ==
Yue Safy made his senior debut in Cambodia League on 16 March 2018 for Phnom Penh Crown.

== International career ==
Yue Safy made his senior debut in 2020 AFC U-23 Championship qualification against Australia national under-23 soccer team on 22 March 2019.

=== International goals ===
No.	Date	Venue	Opponent	Score	Result	Competition
1.	9 December 2021	Bishan Stadium, Bishan, Singapore	Indonesia	1–3	2–4	2020 AFF Championship

== Honours ==
Phnom Penh Crown

- Cambodian Premier League: 2021, 2022
- Cambodian Super Cup: 2022, 2023
- Cambodian League Cup: 2022, 2023
