= Vannasone Douangmaity =

Laotian footballer

Personal information
- Full name: Vannasone Douangmaity
- Date of birth: 15 March 1997 (age 29)
- Place of birth: Attapeu, Laos
- Height: 1.71 m (5 ft 7 in)
- Positions: Forward; winger

Team information
- Current team: Yunnan Yukun (on loan from Namtha United)

Senior career*
Years	Team	Apps	(Gls)
2019-2022	Young Elephant		
2023-	Namtha United	0	(0)
2023-	Yunnan Yukun	6	(2)

International career
2019–	Laos	10	(1)
- * Club domestic league appearances and goals

Vannasone Douangmaity (born March 15, 1997) is a Laotian footballer who plays as a forward or a winger for Yunnan Yukun and the Laos national football team.

== Career statistics ==
=== International ===
As of matches played 11 November 2019.

National team	Year	Apps	Goals
Laos
Laos	2019	4	1
Total		4	1

=== International goals ===
Scores and results list Laos' goal tally first.

No	Date	Venue	Opponent	Score	Result	Competition
1.	28 May 2019	New Laos National Stadium, Vientiane, Laos	Sri Lanka	1–0	2–1	Friendly
