= Win Moe Kyaw =

Burmese footballer (born 1996)

Personal information
- Full name: Win Moe Kyaw
- Date of birth: 1 February 1997 (age 29)
- Place of birth: Kyaukse, Myanmar
- Height: 1.72 m (5 ft 7 1/2 in)
- Position: Centre-back

Team information
- Current team: Hanthawaddy United
- Number: 24

Youth career
- 2013–2015: Paleik Youth

Senior career*
Years	Team	Apps	(Gls)
2015–2020	Magwe	118	(0)
2022–	Hanthawaddy United	32	(2)

International career^{‡}
2018–	Myanmar	16	(0)
- * Club domestic league appearances and goals as of 6 August 2023 ‡ National team caps and goals as of 30 December 2022

Win Moe Kyaw (born 1 February 1997) is a Burmese professional footballer currently playing as a centre-back.

== Career statistics ==
=== International ===
As of match played 30 December 2022

Appearances and goals by national team and year
National team	Year	Apps	Goals
Myanmar	2018	3	0
Myanmar	2019	1	0
Myanmar	2021	6	0
Myanmar	2022	5	0
Myanmar	2023	1	0
Total		16	0
