= Tes Sambath =

Cambodian footballer (2000–2025)

Personal information
- Date of birth: 20 October 2000
- Place of birth: Takéo, Cambodia
- Date of death: 20 April 2025 (aged 24)
- Place of death: Khan Dangkao, Phnom Penh, Cambodia
- Height: 1.78 m (5 ft 10 in)
- Positions: Centre back; defensive midfielder

Youth career
- 2014–2018: Bati Academy

Senior career*
| Years | Team | Apps | (Gls) |
| 2018–2021 | Boeung Ket | | |
| 2021–2025 | Visakha | 52 | (0) |

International career
- Cambodia
| 2019–2022 | Cambodia U22 | | |
| 2021–2023 | Cambodia | 16 | (0) |
- * Club domestic league appearances and goals

Tes Sambath (Khmer: ទេស សម្បត្តិ, Tés Sâmbâttĕ [teːh sɑmɓat]; 20 October 2000 – 20 April 2025) was a Cambodian professional footballer who played as a centre back or a defensive midfielder. He appeared 16 times for the Cambodia national team between 2021 and 2023.

== Career ==
Tes attended the Bati National Football Academy for four years, from 2014 to graduating in 2018, before becoming a professional player. He briefly played professionally in Bangladesh in 2019.

In May 2021, Tes was called up to the Cambodia national team's 24-man squad for 2022 FIFA World Cup qualification.

== Death ==
Tes died on 20 April 2025, after falling into a river while riding his motorbike in Khan Dangkao, Phnom Penh. He was 24 years old.

After his death the Visakha football club expressed their condolences at his passing and declared a period of mourning. Several other Cambodian teams and organizations also expressed their remorse at Tes's death.

== Career statistics ==
Appearances and goals by national team and year
| National team | Year | Apps | Goals |
|---|---|---|---|
| Cambodia | 2021 | 9 | 0 |
| Cambodia | 2022 | 6 | 0 |
| Cambodia | 2023 | 1 | 0 |
| Total | | 16 | 0 |
