= Min Ratanak =

Cambodian footballer

Personal information
- Full name: Min Ratanak
- Date of birth: 30 July 2002 (age 24)
- Place of birth: Kampong Speu, Cambodia
- Height: 1.69 m (5 ft 7 in)
- Position: Midfielder

Team information
- Current team: Preah Khan Reach Svay Rieng
- Number: 11

Senior career*
Years	Team	Apps	(Gls)
2019–	Preah Khan Reach Svay Rieng		

International career^{‡}
2019	Cambodia U19		
2021–2023	Cambodia U23		
2021–	Cambodia	18	(3)
Medal record
Men's football
Representing Cambodia
FIFA ASEAN Challenge Cup
Runner-up	2026 Hong Kong
- * Club domestic league appearances and goals ‡ National team caps and goals as of 5 October 2026

Min Ratanak (born 30 July 2002) is a Cambodian professional footballer who plays as a midfielder for Cambodian Premier League club Preah Khan Reach Svay Rieng and the Cambodia national team.

== Career statistics ==
=== International ===
As of match played 9 June 2026

Appearances and goals by national team and year
National team	Year	Apps	Goals
Cambodia	2021	5	0
Cambodia	2022	–	
Cambodia	2023	–	
Cambodia	2024	7	2
Cambodia	2025	2	1
Cambodia	2026	2	0
Total		16	3

Scores and results list Cambodia's goal tally first, score column indicates score after each Min goal.

List of international goals scored by Min Ratanak
No.	Date	Venue	Opponent	Score	Result	Competition
1	11 October 2024	Phnom Penh Olympic Stadium, Phnom Penh, Cambodia	Chinese Taipei	1–1	3–2	Friendly
2	11 October 2024	Phnom Penh Olympic Stadium, Phnom Penh, Cambodia	Chinese Taipei	3–2	3–2	Friendly
3	5 June 2025	Phnom Penh Olympic Stadium, Phnom Penh, Cambodia	Tajikistan	1–2	1–2	Friendly
