= Kaharn Phetsivilay =

Laotian association football player

Personal information
- Date of birth: 9 September 1998 (age 28)
- Place of birth: Luang Prabang, Laos
- Height: 1.75 m (5 ft 9 in)
- Position: Center-back

Team information
- Current team: Luang Prabang
- Number: 99

Senior career*
Years	Team	Apps	(Gls)
2018	Luang Prabang United		
2019–2025	Young Elephants	30+	(3+)
2025–	Luang Prabang	23	(1)

International career^{‡}
2018–	Laos	18	(0)
- * Club domestic league appearances and goals as of 14 March 2026 ‡ National team caps and goals as of 4 August 2026

Kaharn Phetsivilay (Lao: ກາຫານ ເພັດສີວິໄລ, born 9 September 1998) is a Laotian professional footballer currently playing as a center back for Lao League 1 club Luang Prabang.

== International career ==
With Laos national team, Kaharn took part in the 2018, 2021 and 2026 edition of the ASEAN Championship.

== Career statistics ==
=== International ===
As of matches played 21 January 2019.

National team	Year	Apps	Goals
Laos	2018	6	0
Total		6	0
