= Choun Chanchav =

Cambodian footballer (born 1999)

Personal information
- Full name: Choun Chanchav
- Date of birth: 5 May 1999 (age 27)
- Place of birth: Sihanoukville Province, Cambodia
- Height: 1.74 m (5 ft 9 in)
- Positions: Centre back; defensive midfielder

Team information
- Current team: Phnom Penh Crown
- Number: 15

Youth career
- 2011–2017: Phnom Penh Crown

Senior career*
Years	Team	Apps	(Gls)
2017–	Phnom Penh Crown		

International career^{‡}
- Cambodia U14
2016	Cambodia U19		
2017–2022	Cambodia U23		(1)
2017–	Cambodia	17	(2)
Medal record
Men's football
Representing Cambodia
FIFA ASEAN Challenge Cup
Runner-up	2026 Hong Kong
- * Club domestic league appearances and goals ‡ National team caps and goals as of 14:40, 2 January 2023 (UTC)

Choun Chanchav (born 5 May 1999) is a Cambodian professional footballer who plays as a centre back or a defensive midfielder for Cambodian Premier League club Phnom Penh Crown and the Cambodia national team.

== International career ==
Chanchav made his senior debut in 2020 AFF Championship against Indonesia national football team on 9 December 2021.

=== International goals ===
No.	Date	Venue	Opponent	Score	Result	Competition
1.	2 June 2022	Morodok Techo National Stadium, Phnom Penh, Cambodia	Timor-Leste	2–1	2–1	Friendly
2.	29 December 2022	Morodok Techo National Stadium, Phnom Penh, Cambodia	Brunei	1–1	5–1	2022 AFF Championship

== Honours ==
=== Club ===
Phnom Penh Crown

- Cambodian Premier League: 2021, 2022
- Hun Sen Cup: 2024–25
- Cambodian Super Cup: 2022, 2023
- Cambodian League Cup: 2022, 2023
