= Ryu Hirose =

Japanese footballer and manager

Personal information
- Date of birth: 19 April 1956 (age 70)
- Height: 1.78 m (5 ft 10 in)
- Position: Midfielder

Team information
- Current team: Nagano Parceiro (women)

Youth career
- 1972–1974: Teikyo High School
- 1975–1978: Chuo University

Senior career*
Years	Team	Apps	(Gls)
1979–1987	Fujita Engineering		

Managerial career
- Teikyo University
- Seoul Digital University
- Samut Prakan City
- 2016–2019: Guangzhou City (youth)
- ?–2021: Soltilo Tokyo
- 2021–2023: Cambodia U23
- 2021–2023: Cambodia
- 2023–: Nagano Parceiro (women)
- * Club domestic league appearances and goals

Ryu Hirose (廣瀬 龍, Hirose Ryu; born 19 April 1956) is a Japanese football manager and former player he is currently head coach of WE League club Nagano Parceiro. He had previously managed teams in Japan, South Korea, China, Thailand, and Cambodia.

== Managerial career ==
As of match played 2 January 2023

Managerial record by team and tenure
Team	From	To	Record					Ref.
Team	From	To	P	W	D	L	Win %	Ref.
Cambodia	26 March 2021	Present	20	7	1	12	35.0	
Total			20	7	1	12	35.0	—
