= Keo-Oudone Souvannasangso =

Laotian footballer (born 2000)

Personal information
- Date of birth: 1 June 2000 (age 26)
- Place of birth: Vientiane, Laos
- Position: Goalkeeper

Team information
- Current team: Lao Army F.C.

Senior career*
| Years | Team | Apps | (Gls) |
| 2018– | Lao Army F.C. | 53 | (0) |

International career^{‡}
| 2021– | Laos | 12 | (0) |
- * Club domestic league appearances and goals as of 2 August 2026 ‡ National team caps and goals as of 2 August 2026

Keo-Oudone Souvannasangso (Lao: ແກ້ວອຸດອນ ສຸວັນນະສັງໂສ) (born 1 June 2000) is a Laotian professional footballer who plays as a goalkeeper for Lao League 1 club Lao Army F.C. and the Laos national football team.

== International career ==
Souvannasangso has made several appearances for the Laos national football team, including against Malaysia and Thailand.
