= Thailand national football team results (2020–present) =

This article provides details of international football games played by the Thailand national football team from 2020 to present.

== Results ==
Key
Win
Draw
Defeat

=== 2020 ===
30 March Friendly	Thailand	Cancelled	Curaçao	Bangkok, Thailand
				Stadium: Rajamangala National Stadium
Note: Thailand-Curaçao match cancelled due to the COVID-19 pandemic.

=== 2021 ===
25 May Friendly	Thailand	0–1	Oman	Dubai, United Arab Emirates
19:15 UTC+4		Report	Al-Muqbali 43'	Stadium: The Sevens Stadium; Referee: Mohammed Abdulla Alali (United Arab Emirates)

29 May Friendly	Thailand	2–2	Tajikistan	Sharjah, United Arab Emirates
19:45 UTC+4	Mueanta 50', 58'	Report	Panjshanbe 63'; Zoirov 89'	Stadium: Khalid bin Mohammed Stadium; Referee: Sultan Mohamed (United Arab Emirates)

30 May Unofficial friendly	Thailand	1–4	Uzbekistan	Dubai, United Arab Emirates
19:00 UTC+4	Kraisorn 60'	Report	Aliqulov 63'; Ahmedov 70'; Abdukholiqov 73', 90'	Stadium: The Sevens Stadium

3 June 2022 World Cup qualification	Thailand	2–2	Indonesia	Dubai, United Arab Emirates
20:45 UTC+4	Weerawatnodom 5'; Kraisorn 50'	Report	Kadek 39'; Dimas 60'	Stadium: Al Maktoum Stadium; Attendance: 0 Referee: Ammar Mahfoodh (Bahrain)

7 June 2022 World Cup qualification	United Arab Emirates	3–1	Thailand	Dubai, United Arab Emirates
20:45 UTC+4	Caio 14'; Lima 33'; Jumaa 90+4'	Report	Mueanta 54'	Stadium: Zabeel Stadium; Attendance: 980; Referee: Ryuji Sato (Japan)

15 June 2022 World Cup qualification	Thailand	0–1	Malaysia	Dubai, United Arab Emirates
20:45 UTC+4		Report	Safawi 52' (pen.)	Stadium: Al Maktoum Stadium; Attendance: 142; Referee: Mohammed Al-Hoish (Saudi Arabia)

5 December 2020 AFF Championship GS	Timor-Leste	0–2	Thailand	Kallang, Singapore
17:30 UTC+8		Report	Charoenrattanapirom 51'; Sarachat 81'	Stadium: National Stadium; Attendance: 2,432; Referee: Qasim Al-Hatmi (Oman)

11 December 2020 AFF Championship GS	Thailand	4–0	Myanmar	Kallang, Singapore
20:30 UTC+8	Dangda 23', 53' (pen.); Kanitsribampen 78'; Sarachat 90+2'	Report		Stadium: National Stadium; Referee: Shukri Hussain Al-Alhunfush (Saudi Arabia)

14 December 2020 AFF Championship GS	Philippines	1–2	Thailand	Kallang, Singapore
17:30 UTC+8	Reichelt 57'	Report	Dangda 26', 78' (pen.)	Stadium: National Stadium; Attendance: 2,559; Referee: Qasim Al-Hatmi (Oman)

18 December 2020 AFF Championship GS	Thailand	2–0	Singapore	Kallang, Singapore
20:30 UTC+8	Dolah 31'; Chaided 45+2'	Report		Stadium: National Stadium; Referee: Ahmad Yacoub Ibrahim (Jordan)

23 December 2020 AFF Championship SF 1st leg	Vietnam	0–2	Thailand	Kallang, Singapore
20:30 UTC+8		Report	Songkrasin 14', 23'	Stadium: National Stadium; Referee: Saoud Ali Al-Adba (Qatar)

26 December 2020 AFF Championship SF 2nd leg	Thailand	0–0 (2–0 agg.)	Vietnam	Kallang, Singapore
20:30 UTC+8		Report		Stadium: National Stadium; Attendance: 8,121; Referee: Ahmad Yacoub Ibrahim (Jordan)

29 December 2020 AFF Cup Final 1st leg	Indonesia	0–4	Thailand	Kallang, Singapore
20:30 UTC+8		Report	Songkrasin 2', 52'; Sarachat 67'; Phala 83'	Stadium: National Stadium; Referee: Shukri Al-Alhunfush (Saudi Arabia)

=== 2022 ===
1 January 2020 AFF Cup Final 2nd leg	Thailand	2–2 (6–2 agg.)	Indonesia	Kallang, Singapore
20:30 UTC+8	Kraisorn 54'; Yooyen 56'	Report	Kambuaya 7'; Maulana 80'	Stadium: National Stadium; Referee: Ahmed Faisal Al-Ali (Jordan)

24 March Friendly	Thailand	2–0	Nepal	Chonburi, Thailand
19:00 UTC+7	Roller 78'; Veerachat 89'	Report		Stadium: Chonburi Stadium; Referee: Torpong Somsingha (Thailand)

27 March Friendly	Thailand	1–0	Suriname	Pathum Thani, Thailand
19:00 UTC+7	Phala 27'	Report		Stadium: BG Stadium; Referee: Warintorn Sassadee (Thailand)

27 May Friendly	Thailand	1–0	Turkmenistan	Sisaket, Thailand
18:30 UTC+7	Kraisorn 88'	Report		Stadium: Sisaket SAT Stadium; Referee: Warintorn Sassadee (Thailand)

31 May Friendly	Thailand	1–2	Bahrain	Pathum Thani, Thailand
20:00 UTC+7	Dangda 4' (pen.)	Report	Al-Khatal 45+1'; Isa 90+1'	Stadium: BG Stadium; Referee: Songkran Bunmeekiart (Thailand)

8 June 2023 Asian Cup qualification	Thailand	3–0	Maldives	Namangan, Uzbekistan
17:00 UTC+5	Yooyen 40'; Dangda 45+2'; Hemviboon 80'	Report		Stadium: Markaziy Stadium; Attendance: 1,100; Referee: Mohammad Arafah (Jordan)

11 June 2023 Asian Cup qualification	Sri Lanka	0–2	Thailand	Namangan, Uzbekistan
17:00 UTC+5		Report	Puangchan 34'; Kanitsribampen 90+5'	Stadium: Markaziy Stadium; Attendance: 570; Referee: Khaled Al-Shaqsi (Oman)

14 June 2023 Asian Cup qualification	Uzbekistan	2–0	Thailand	Namangan, Uzbekistan
20:30 UTC+5	Masharipov 8'; Turgunboev 23'	Report		Stadium: Markaziy Stadium; Attendance: 21,405; Referee: Hasan Akrami (Iran)

22 September 2022 King's Cup	Thailand	1–1 (3–5 p)	Malaysia	Chiang Mai, Thailand
20:30 UTC+7	Hemviboon 90+5'	Report	Corbin-Ong 32'	Stadium: 700th Anniversary Stadium; Attendance: 16,219; Referee: Muhammaq Taqi (Singapore)
	Penalties
	Pathompol (penalty scored); Suphanat (penalty scored); Kritsada (penalty scored); Supachok (penalty missed)		(penalty scored) Cools; (penalty scored) Syafiq; (penalty scored) Davies; (penalty scored) Lambert; (penalty scored) Corbin-Ong

25 September 2022 King's Cup	Thailand	2–1	Trinidad and Tobago	Chiang Mai, Thailand
17:30 UTC+7	Promsrikaew 21'; Sarachat 72'	Report	Kaman 61' (o.g.)	Stadium: 700th Anniversary Stadium; Attendance: 12,212; Referee: Muhammaq Taqi (Singapore)

11 December Friendly	Thailand	6–0	Myanmar	Pathum Thani, Thailand
20:30 UTC+7	Dangda 12' (pen.), 58'; Phala 29'; Nanda Kyaw 45' (o.g.); Yooyen 45+3'; Nyein Chan 75' (o.g.)	Report		Stadium: Thammasat Stadium; Referee: Mohd Amirul Izwan Yaacob (Malaysia)

14 December Friendly	Thailand	0–1	Chinese Taipei	Pathum Thani, Thailand
20:30 UTC+7		Report	Chen Jui-chieh 72'	Stadium: Thammasat Stadium; Referee: Mohd Amirul Izwan bin Yaacob (Malaysia)

20 December 2022 AFF Championship GS	Brunei	0–5	Thailand	Kuala Lumpur, Malaysia
20:30 UTC+8		Report	Phala 19'; Dangda 44'; Yunos 88' (o.g.); Peeradol 90+1' (pen.), 90+3'	Stadium: Kuala Lumpur Stadium; Attendance: 480; Referee: Chen Hsin-Chuan (Chinese Taipei)

26 December 2022 AFF Championship GS	Thailand	4–0	Philippines	Pathum Thani, Thailand
19:30 UTC+7	Dangda 3', 41' (pen.); Kraisorn 57'; Bureerat 63'	Report		Stadium: Thammasat Stadium; Attendance: 6,567; Referee: Yudai Yamamoto (Japan)

29 December 2022 AFF Championship GS	Indonesia	1–1	Thailand	Jakarta, Indonesia
16:30 UTC+7	Klok 50' (pen.)	Report	Yooyen 79'	Stadium: Gelora Bung Karno Stadium; Attendance: 49,985; Referee: Mohammed Al Hoish (Saudi Arabia)

=== 2023 ===
2 January 2022 AFF Championship GS	Thailand	3–1	Cambodia	Pathum Thani, Thailand
19:30 UTC+7	Dangda 45+2' (pen.), 90'; Purisai 50'	Report	Chanthea 68'	Stadium: Thammasat Stadium; Attendance: 8,415; Referee: Omar Mohamed Al Ali (United Arab Emirates)

7 January 2022 AFF Championship SF 1st Leg	Malaysia	1–0	Thailand	Kuala Lumpur, Malaysia
20:30 UTC+8	Halim 11'	Report		Stadium: Bukit Jalil Stadium; Attendance: 62,989; Referee: Kim Dae-yong (South Korea)

10 January 2022 AFF Championship SF 2nd Leg	Thailand	3–0 (3–1 agg.)	Malaysia	Pathum Thani, Thailand
19:30 UTC+7	Dangda 19'; Phala 55'; Kraisorn 71'	Report		Stadium: Thammasat Stadium; Attendance: 18,927; Referee: Adham Makhadmeh (Jordan)

13 January 2022 AFF Championship Final 1st Leg	Vietnam	2–2	Thailand	Hanoi, Vietnam
19:30 UTC+7	Nguyễn Tiến Linh 24'; Vũ Văn Thanh 88'	Report	Arjvirai 48'; Yooyen 63'	Stadium: Mỹ Đình National Stadium; Attendance: 38,539; Referee: Ko Hyung-jin (South Korea)

16 January 2022 AFF Championship Final 2nd Leg	Thailand	1–0 (3–2 agg.)	Vietnam	Pathum Thani, Thailand
19:30 UTC+7	Bunmathan 24'	Report		Stadium: Thammasat Stadium; Attendance: 19,306; Referee: Jumpei Iida (Japan)

25 March Friendly	Syria	3–1	Thailand	Dubai, United Arab Emirates
21:00 UTC+4	Al Somah 26'; Khribin 56' (pen.); Al-Hallaq 85'	Report	Mueanta 45+3'	Stadium: Maktoum bin Rashid Al Maktoum Stadium; Referee: Mohamed Al-Hammadi (United Arab Emirates)

28 March Friendly	United Arab Emirates	2–0	Thailand	Abu Dhabi, United Arab Emirates
22:00 UTC+4	Abdalla 55'; Mohammed 79'	Report		Stadium: Al Nahyan Stadium; Referee: Abbas Gholoum (Kuwait)

16 June Friendly	Chinese Taipei	2–2	Thailand	Kaohsiung, Taiwan
19:00 UTC+8	Kritsada 48' (o.g.); Chen Ting-yang 87'	Report	Teerasil 62'; Wang Ruei 84' (o.g.)	Stadium: National Stadium; Attendance: 6,762; Referee: Liu Kwok Man (Hong Kong)

19 June Friendly	Hong Kong	0–1	Thailand	So Kon Po, Hong Kong
20:00 UTC+8		Report	Teerasil 63'	Stadium: Hong Kong Stadium; Attendance: 13,434; Referee: Jansen Foo (Singapore)

7 September 2023 King's Cup	Thailand	2–1	Lebanon	Chiang Mai, Thailand
20:30 UTC+7	Ayoub 45+3' (o.g.); Teerasil 85'	Report	Jradi 57'	Stadium: 700th Anniversary Stadium; Attendance: 16,583; Referee: Kim Hee-gon (South Korea)

10 September 2023 King's Cup	Thailand	2–2 (4–5 p)	Iraq	Chiang Mai, Thailand
20:30 UTC+7	Mickelson 37'; Bordin 82'	Report	Hussein 6'; Attwan 65'	Stadium: 700th Anniversary Stadium; Attendance: 16,543; Referee: Kim Hee-gon (South Korea)
	Penalties
	Kritsada (penalty scored); Thitipan (penalty scored); Pokklaw (penalty scored); Pathompol (penalty missed); Theeraton (penalty scored)		(penalty scored) Abdulla; (penalty scored) Doski; (penalty scored) Farhan; (penalty scored) Bayesh; (penalty scored) Attwan

12 October Friendly	Georgia	8–0	Thailand	Tbilisi, Georgia
20:00 UTC+4	Davitashvili 9', 43'; Lochoshvili 12'; Mikautadze 24', 37', 41', 56' (pen.); Kvaratskhelia 66'	Report		Stadium: Mikheil Meskhi Stadium; Attendance: 9,274; Referee: Rohit Saggi (Norway)

17 October Friendly	Estonia	1–1	Thailand	Tallinn, Estonia
19:00 UTC+3	Anier 71'	Report	Jakkapan 76'	Stadium: A. Le Coq Arena; Attendance: 1,502; Referee: Trustin Farrugia Cann (Malta)

16 November 2026 WCQ / 2027 ACQ	Thailand	1–2	China	Bangkok, Thailand
19:30 UTC+7	Sarach 23'	Report	Wu Lei 29'; Wang Shangyuan 74'	Stadium: Rajamangala Stadium; Attendance: 35,009; Referee: Salman Falahi (Qatar)

21 November 2026 WCQ / 2027 ACQ	Singapore	1–3	Thailand	Kallang, Singapore
20:00 UTC+8	Shawal 41'	Report	Supachok 5'; Suphanat 66', 87'	Stadium: Singapore National Stadium; Attendance: 29,644; Referee: Ahmad Al-Ali (Kuwait)

=== 2024 ===
1 January 2024 Toyo Tires Cup	Japan	5–0	Thailand	Tokyo, Japan
14:00 UTC+9	Tanaka 50'; Nakamura 72'; Elias 75' (o.g.); Kawamura 82'; Minamino 90+1'	Report		Stadium: Japan National Stadium; Attendance: 61,916; Referee: Kim Woo-sung (South Korea)

16 January 2023 Asian Cup GS	Thailand	2–0	Kyrgyzstan	Doha, Qatar
17:30 UTC+3	Supachai 26', 48'	Report		Stadium: Abdullah bin Khalifa Stadium; Attendance: 4,530; Referee: Adham Makhadmeh (Jordan)

21 January 2023 Asian Cup GS	Oman	0–0	Thailand	Doha, Qatar
17:30 UTC+3		Report		Stadium: Abdullah bin Khalifa Stadium; Attendance: 6,340; Referee: Mooud Bonyadifard (Iran)

25 January 2023 Asian Cup GS	Saudi Arabia	0–0	Thailand	Al Rayyan, Qatar
18:00 UTC+3		Report		Stadium: Education City Stadium; Attendance: 38,773; Referee: Kim Hee-gon (South Korea)

30 January 2023 Asian Cup R16	Uzbekistan	2–1	Thailand	Al Wakrah, Qatar
14:30 UTC+3	Turgunboev 37'; Fayzullaev 65'	Report	Supachok 58'	Stadium: Al Janoub Stadium; Attendance: 18,691; Referee: Nazmi Nasaruddin (Malaysia)

21 March 2026 WCQ / 2027 ACQ	South Korea	1–1	Thailand	Seoul, South Korea
20:00 UTC+9	Son Heung-min 42'	Report (FIFA); Report (AFC)	Suphanat 61'	Stadium: Seoul World Cup Stadium; Attendance: 64,912; Referee: Khalid Al-Turais (Saudi Arabia)

26 March 2026 WCQ / 2027 ACQ	Thailand	0–3	South Korea	Bangkok, Thailand
19:30 UTC+7		Report (FIFA); Report (AFC)	Lee Jae-sung 19'; Son Heung-min 54'; Park Jin-seop 82'	Stadium: Rajamangala Stadium; Attendance: 45,458; Referee: Adham Makhadmeh (Jordan)

6 June 2026 WCQ / 2027 ACQ	China	1–1	Thailand	Shenyang, China
20:00 UTC+8	Behram 79'	Report (FIFA); Report (AFC)	Supachok 20'	Stadium: Shenyang Olympic Sports Center Stadium; Attendance: 46,979; Referee: Ilgiz Tantashev (Uzbekistan)

11 June 2026 WCQ / 2027 ACQ	Thailand	3–1	Singapore	Bangkok, Thailand
19:30 UTC+7	Supachok 5'; Suphanat 66', 87'	Report (FIFA); Report (AFC)	Shawal 20'	Stadium: Rajamangala Stadium; Attendance: 39,404; Referee: Ahmed Al Alili (United Arab Emirates)

7 September 2024 LPBank Cup	Thailand	Cancelled	Russia	Hanoi, Vietnam
20:00 UTC+7		Report		Stadium: Mỹ Đình National Stadium
Note: Thailand-Russia match called off due to Typhoon Yagi.

10 September 2024 LPBank Cup	Vietnam	1–2	Thailand	Hanoi, Vietnam
20:00 UTC+7	Nguyễn Tiến Linh 21'	Report	Suphanat 26'; Gustavsson 40'	Stadium: Mỹ Đình National Stadium; Referee: Suhaizi Shukri (Malaysia)

11 October 2024 King's Cup	Thailand	3–1	Philippines	Songkhla, Thailand
20:00 UTC+7	Songkrasin 53'; Suphanat 68', 87'	Report	Kristensen 63'	Stadium: Tinsulanon Stadium; Attendance: 19,506; Referee: Ngo Duy Lan (Vietnam)

14 October 2024 King's Cup	Thailand	2–1	Syria	Songkhla, Thailand
20:00 UTC+7	Ekanit 44'; Chanathip 90+1'	Report	Ham 53'	Stadium: Tinsulanon Stadium; Attendance: 24,121; Referee: Jansen Foo Chuan Hui (Singapore)

14 November Friendly	Thailand	0–0	Lebanon	Pathum Thani, Thailand
19:30 UTC+7		Report		Stadium: Thammasat Stadium; Attendance: 5,816; Referee: Tam Ping Wun (Hong Kong)

17 November Friendly	Thailand	1–1	Laos	Pathum Thani, Thailand
19:30 UTC+7	Seksan 60'	Report	Bounkong 69'	Stadium: Thammasat Stadium; Attendance: 4,637; Referee: Tam Ping Wun (Hong Kong)

8 December 2024 ASEAN Championship GS	Timor-Leste	0–10	Thailand	Hanoi, Vietnam
20:00 UTC+7		Report	Davis 4', 32'; Gustavsson 17'; Suphanat 28', 54'; Seksan 56', 61'; Teerasak 79', 90+2'; Mickelson 90+3'	Stadium: Hàng Đẫy Stadium; Attendance: 1,239; Referee: Kim Dae-yong (South Korea)

14 December 2024 ASEAN Championship GS	Thailand	1–0	Malaysia	Bangkok, Thailand
20:00 UTC+7	Gustavsson 57'	Report		Stadium: Rajamangala Stadium; Attendance: 25,619; Referee: Rustam Lutfullin (Uzbekistan)

17 December 2024 ASEAN Championship GS	Singapore	2–4	Thailand	Kallang, Singapore
20:30 UTC+8	Shawal 10'; Faris 34'	Report	Gustavsson 45+3'; Suphanat 52'; Peeradol 90+3'; Teerasak 90+15'	Stadium: National Stadium; Attendance: 22,611; Referee: Ismaeel Habib Ali (Bahrain)

20 December 2024 ASEAN Championship GS	Thailand	3–2	Cambodia	Bangkok, Thailand
20:00 UTC+7	Akarapong 33', 78'; Chalermsak 84'	Report	Nieto 32'; Coulibaly 90+6'	Stadium: Rajamangala Stadium; Attendance: 15,261; Referee: Tam Ping Wun (Hong Kong)

27 December 2024 ASEAN Championship SF 1st leg	Philippines	2–1	Thailand	Manila, Philippines
21:00 UTC+8	Reyes 21'; Linares 90+5'	Report	Suphanan 45'	Stadium: Rizal Memorial Stadium; Attendance: 7,160; Referee: Kim Dae-yong (South Korea)

30 December 2024 ASEAN Championship SF 2nd leg	Thailand	3–1 (a.e.t.) (4–3 agg.)	Philippines	Bangkok, Thailand
20:00 UTC+7	Peeradol 37'; Gustavsson 54'; Suphanat 116'	Report	Kristensen 84'	Stadium: Rajamangala Stadium; Attendance: 31,876; Referee: Hiroyuki Kimura (Japan)

=== 2025 ===
2 January 2024 ASEAN Championship Final 1st leg	Vietnam	2–1	Thailand	Việt Trì, Vietnam
20:00 UTC+7	Nguyễn Xuân Son 59', 73'	Report	Chalermsak 83'	Stadium: Việt Trì Stadium; Attendance: 15,604; Referee: Salman Ahmad Falahi (Qatar)

5 January 2024 ASEAN Championship Final 2nd leg	Thailand	2–3 (3–5 agg.)	Vietnam	Bangkok, Thailand
20:00 UTC+7	Davis 28'; Supachok 64'	Report	Phạm Tuấn Hải 8'; Pansa 82' (o.g.); Nguyễn Hai Long 90+20'	Stadium: Rajamangala Stadium; Attendance: 46,982; Referee: Ko Hyung-jin (South Korea)

21 March Friendly	Thailand	2–0	Afghanistan	Bangkok, Thailand
20:00 UTC+7	Gustavsson 6', 52'	Report		Stadium: Rajamangala Stadium; Attendance: 10,219; Referee: Razlan Joffri Ali (Malaysia)

25 March 2027 Asian Cup Q	Thailand	1–0	Sri Lanka	Bangkok, Thailand
19:30 UTC+7	Gustavsson 43'	Report		Stadium: Rajamangala Stadium; Attendance: 17,207; Referee: Zhang Lei (China)

4 June Friendly	Thailand	2–0	India	Pathum Thani, Thailand
19:30 UTC+7	Davis 8'; Arjvirai 59'	Report		Stadium: Thammasat Stadium; Attendance: 5,045; Referee: Ping Wun Tam (Hong Kong)

10 June 2027 Asian Cup Q	Turkmenistan	3–1	Thailand	Ashgabat, Turkmenistan
20:00 UTC+5	Titow 1'; Saparmämmedow 37'; Saparow 66'	Report	Supachai 35'	Stadium: Köpetdag Stadium; Attendance: 15,545; Referee: Ismaeel Habib Ali (Bahrain)

4 September 2025 King's Cup	Thailand	3–0	Fiji	Kanchanaburi, Thailand
20:00 UTC+7	Davis 11'; Teerasak 17'; Poramet 47'	Report		Stadium: Kanchanaburi Province Stadium; Attendance: 12,545; Referee: Muhammad Taqi (Singapore)

7 September 2025 King's Cup	Thailand	0–1	Iraq	Kanchanaburi, Thailand
20:00 UTC+7		Report	Ali 75'	Stadium: Kanchanaburi Province Stadium; Attendance: 13,987; Referee: Nazmi Nasaruddin (Malaysia)

9 October 2027 Asian Cup Q	Thailand	2–0	Chinese Taipei	Bangkok, Thailand
19:30 UTC+7	Seksan 51'; Chanathip 78'	Report		Stadium: Rajamangala Stadium; Attendance: 13,970; Referee: Amir Arab Baraghi (Iran)

14 October 2027 Asian Cup Q	Chinese Taipei	1–6	Thailand	Taipei, Taiwan
18:30 UTC+8	Kuo Po-wei 46'	Report	Teerasak 4', 62', 76'; Seksan 25'; Supachok 45+1'; Huang Tzu-ming 90+3' (o.g.)	Stadium: Taipei Municipal Stadium; Attendance: 4,563; Referee: Omar Al Yaqoubi (Oman)

13 November Friendly	Thailand	3–2	Singapore	Pathum Thani, Thailand
19:30 UTC+7	Sarach 15'; Theerathon 47'; Seksan 53'	Report	Kweh 17', 62'	Stadium: Thammasat Stadium; Attendance: 10,205; Referee: Hoàng Ngọc Hà (Vietnam)

18 November 2027 Asian Cup Q	Sri Lanka	0–4	Thailand	Colombo, Sri Lanka
15:45 UTC+5:30		Report	Thanawat 7'; Soonsup-Bell 65', 90'; Pansa 77'	Stadium: Colombo Racecourse; Attendance: 2,910; Referee: Sultan Mohamed Al Hammadi (United Arab Emirates)

=== 2026 ===
31 March 2027 Asian Cup Q	Thailand	2–1	Turkmenistan	Bangkok, Thailand
19:30 UTC+7	Suphanan 14'; Bihr 89'	Report	Çaryýew 60'	Stadium: Rajamangala Stadium; Attendance: 37,373; Referee: Shen Yinhao (China)

5 June Friendly	Thailand	2–2	Kuwait	Pathum Thani, Thailand
19:30 UTC+7	Seksan 42'; Kritsada 45+4'	Report	Majed 48'; Al-Rashidi 69'	Stadium: True BG Stadium; Attendance: 5,420; Referee: Nazmi Nasaruddin (Malaysia)

9 June Friendly	China	0–0	Thailand	Hangzhou, China
19:35 UTC+8		Report		Stadium: Huanglong Sports Center; Attendance: 27,005; Referee: Ko Hyung-jin (South Korea)

25 July 2026 ASEAN Championship GS	Laos	0–5	Thailand	Vientiane, Laos
20:00 UTC+7		Report	Teerasak 11'; Kakana 27', 59'; Yotsakorn 49'; Sarach 52'	Stadium: New Laos National Stadium; Attendance: 7,678; Referee: Choi Hyun-jai (South Korea)

1 August 2026 ASEAN Championship GS	Thailand	2–0	Malaysia	Bangkok, Thailand
20:00 UTC+7	Yotsakorn 38' (pen.); Teerasak 56'	Report		Stadium: Rajamangala Stadium; Attendance: 16,037; Referee: Kim Woo-sung (South Korea)

4 August 2026 ASEAN Championship GS	Philippines	0–1	Thailand	Capas, Philippines
21:00 UTC+8		Report	Waris 84'	Stadium: New Clark City Athletics Stadium; Attendance: 2,786; Referee: Yusuke Ohashi (Japan)

8 August 2026 ASEAN Championship GS	Thailand	2–0	Myanmar	Bangkok, Thailand
20:00 UTC+7	Worachit 11' (pen.); Jehhanafee 52' (pen.)	Report		Stadium: Rajamangala Stadium; Attendance: 13,026; Referee: Yusuke Ohashi (Japan)

15 August 2026 ASEAN Championship SF 1st leg	Singapore	1–3	Thailand	Kallang, Singapore
21:00 UTC+8	Ilhan 84'	Report	Teerasak 13', 26'; Seksan 51'	Stadium: Jalan Besar Stadium; Attendance: 5,358; Referee: Mahmood Al Majarafi (Oman)

18 August 2026 ASEAN Championship SF 2nd leg	Thailand	1–2 (4–3 agg.)	Singapore	Bangkok, Thailand
20:00 UTC+7	Kakana 61' (pen.)	Report	H. Stewart 45'; Pansa 65' (o.g.)	Stadium: Rajamangala Stadium; Attendance: 10,802; Referee: Kim Woo-sung (South Korea)

22 August 2026 ASEAN Championship Final 1st leg	Thailand	0–2	Vietnam	Bangkok, Thailand
20:00 UTC+7		Report	Nguyễn Hai Long 62'; Nguyễn Quang Hải 69'	Stadium: Rajamangala Stadium; Attendance: 26,415; Referee: Sami Al-Ismail (Saudi Arabia)

26 August 2026 ASEAN Championship Final 2nd leg	Vietnam	2–2 (4–2 agg.)	Thailand	Hanoi, Vietnam
20:00 UTC+7	Chatchai 52' (o.g.); Wanchai 90+3' (o.g.)	Report	Yotsakorn 12'; Wanchai 85'	Stadium: Mỹ Đình National Stadium; Attendance: 38,646; Referee: Ahmed Eisa Darwish (United Arab Emirates)

26 September 2026 FIFA ASEAN Cup GS	Pakistan	0–4	Thailand	Bandung, Indonesia
16:00 UTC+7		Report	Teerasak 31', 84'; Soonsup-Bell 41'; Zeb 64' (o.g.)	Stadium: Si Jalak Harupat Stadium; Referee: Kim Hee-gon (South Korea)

29 September 2026 FIFA ASEAN Cup GS	Thailand	2–0	Vietnam	Bandung, Indonesia
19:30 UTC+7	Sarach 10'; Chaiyaphon 90+2'	Report		Stadium: Si Jalak Harupat Stadium; Referee: Ben Abraham (Australia)

2 October 2026 FIFA ASEAN Cup GS	Thailand	1–2	Philippines	Bandung, Indonesia
16:00 UTC+7	Iklas 55'	Report	Kristensen 3', 68'	Stadium: Si Jalak Harupat Stadium; Referee: Razlan Joffri Ali (Malaysia)

5 October 2026 FIFA ASEAN Cup Final	Indonesia	2–2 (a.e.t.) (4–2 p)	Thailand	Jakarta, Indonesia
20:00 UTC+7	James 84'; Baggott 116'	Report	Iklas 87'; Peeradol 111'	Stadium: Gelora Bung Karno Stadium; Attendance: 70,098; Referee: Akhrol Riskullaev (Uzbekistan)
	Penalties
	Diks (penalty scored); James (penalty scored); Baggott (penalty scored); Pattynama (penalty scored)		(penalty scored) Bihr; (penalty scored) Waris; (penalty missed) Sarach; (penalty missed) Sayriya

14 November 2026 King's Cup	Thailand	6–0	Brunei	Sisaket, Thailand
19:30 UTC+7	Asmin 3' (o.g.); Weidersjö 50'; Yotsakorn 60', 74', 80'; Anan 67'	Report		Stadium: Sisaket Provincial Stadium; Attendance: 14,319; Referee: Kōki Nagamine (Japan)

17 November 2026 King's Cup	Thailand	3–0	Tajikistan	Sisaket, Thailand
19:30 UTC+7	Supachok 40'; Teerasak 49', 75'	Report		Stadium: Sisaket Provincial Stadium; Attendance: 17,426; Referee: Koji Takasaki (Japan)
