= 2020 AFF Championship knockout stage =

Asian football tournament

The knockout stage of the 2020 AFF Championship was the second and final stage of the 2020 AFF Championship, following the group stage. It was played from 22 December 2021 to 1 January 2022. The top two teams from each group (four in total) advanced to the knockout stage to compete in a two-legged single-elimination tournament beginning with the semi-finals followed by the final.

== Qualified teams ==
The top two highest-placing teams from each of the two groups advanced to the knockout stage.

Group	Winners	Runners-up
A	Thailand (Note: Due to non-compliance with conditions set by the World Anti-Doping Agency (WADA), Thailand was not allowed to be represented by its national flag. The sanctions took effect in October 2021.)	Singapore
B	Indonesia (Note: Due to non-compliance with conditions set by the World Anti-Doping Agency (WADA), Indonesia was not allowed to be represented by its national flag. The sanctions took effect in October 2021.)	Vietnam

== Schedule ==
The schedule of each round is as follows.

Round	First leg dates	Second leg dates
Semi-finals	22–23 December 2021	25–26 December 2021
Final	29 December 2021	1 January 2022

== Format ==
All ties were played over two legs. The team that scored more goals on aggregate over the two legs won the tie. The away goals rule was not used in this edition, as the tournament was hosted in a centralized venue, which was Singapore. If the aggregate score was level at the end of normal time of the second leg, extra time was played, and if the same number of goals were scored by both teams during extra time, the tie was decided by a penalty shoot-out.

== Bracket ==
Semi-finals
A2	Singapore	1	2	3
B1	Indonesia (a.e.t.)	1	4	5
B2	Vietnam	0	0	0
A1	Thailand	2	0	2

Finals
B1	Indonesia	0	2	2
A1	Thailand	4	2	6

== Semi-finals ==
Team 1	Agg.	Team 2	1st leg	2nd leg
Singapore	3–5	Indonesia	1–1	2–4 (a.e.t.)
Vietnam	0–2	Thailand	0–2	0–0

=== First leg ===
==== Singapore vs Indonesia ====
22 December 2021
20:30

Singapore	1–1	Indonesia
Ikhsan 70'	Report (AFFSZ); Report (AFF)	Witan 28'

National Stadium, Kallang
Attendance: 9,952
Referee: Kim Hee-gon (South Korea)

Singapore	Indonesia

GK	18	Hassan Sunny
RB	4	Nazrul Nazari
CB	17	Irfan Fandi
CB	21	Safuwan Baharudin	(yellow card) 45'
LB	25	Nur Adam Abdullah	(yellow card) 16'	(substituted off) 65'
CM	14	Hariss Harun (c)
CM	23	Zulfahmi Arifin		(substituted off) 46'
CM	8	Shahdan Sulaiman
RF	15	Song Ui-young		(substituted off) 66'
CF	9	Ikhsan Fandi		(substituted off) 71'
LF	10	Faris Ramli		(substituted off) 87'
Substitutions:
MF	6	Anumanthan Kumar		(substituted on) 46'
DF	13	Zulqarnaen Suzliman		(substituted on) 65'
FW	20	Shawal Anuar		(substituted on) 66'
FW	7	Amy Recha		(substituted on) 71'
DF	11	Hafiz Nor		(substituted on) 87'
Manager:
(Japan) Tatsuma Yoshida

GK	23	Nadeo Argawinata
RB	14	Asnawi Mangkualam (c)
CB	19	Fachruddin Aryanto
CB	5	Rizky Ridho		(substituted off) 46'
LB	12	Pratama Arhan	(yellow card) 36'
CM	13	Rachmat Irianto		(substituted off) 66'
CM	28	Alfeandra Dewangga
RW	8	Witan Sulaeman
AM	15	Ricky Kambuaya
LW	25	Irfan Jaya		(substituted off) 90+1'
CF	27	Dedik Setiawan		(substituted off) 46'
Substitutions:
FW	7	Ezra Walian		(substituted on) 46'	(substituted off) 79'
DF	30	Elkan Baggott		(substituted on) 46'
MF	6	Evan Dimas		(substituted on) 66'
FW	29	Hanis Saghara Putra		(substituted on) 79'
FW	22	Yabes Roni		(substituted on) 90+1'
Manager:
(South Korea) Shin Tae-yong

==== Vietnam vs Thailand ====
23 December 2021
20:30

Vietnam	0–2	Thailand
	Report (AFFSZ); Report (AFF)	Chanathip 14', 23'

National Stadium, Kallang
Attendance: 7,355
Referee: Saoud Ali Al-Adba (Qatar)

Vietnam	Thailand

GK	23	Trần Nguyên Mạnh
CB	2	Đỗ Duy Mạnh		(substituted off) 85'
CB	3	Quế Ngọc Hải (c)
CB	16	Nguyễn Thành Chung
RM	17	Vũ Văn Thanh	(yellow card) 43'	(substituted off) 76'
CM	11	Nguyễn Tuấn Anh	(yellow card) 5'	(substituted off) 46'
CM	14	Nguyễn Hoàng Đức
LM	7	Nguyễn Phong Hồng Duy
AM	19	Nguyễn Quang Hải	(yellow card) 38'
CF	9	Nguyễn Văn Toàn		(substituted off) 46'
CF	10	Nguyễn Công Phượng		(substituted off) 58'
Substitutions:
MF	20	Phan Văn Đức		(substituted on) 46'
FW	22	Nguyễn Tiến Linh		(substituted on) 46'
FW	18	Hà Đức Chinh		(substituted on) 58'
DF	13	Hồ Tấn Tài		(substituted on) 76'
MF	5	Phạm Xuân Mạnh		(substituted on) 85'
Manager:
(South Korea) Park Hang-seo

GK	20	Chatchai Budprom	(yellow card) 43'
CB	15	Narubadin Weerawatnodom	(yellow card) 34'	(substituted off) 88'
CB	4	Manuel Bihr
CB	3	Theerathon Bunmathan	(yellow card) 26'
CM	26	Kritsada Kaman	(yellow card) 87'
CM	16	Phitiwat Sukjitthammakul
CM	6	Sarach Yooyen
RW	7	Supachok Sarachat		(substituted off) 62'
AM	12	Thanawat Suengchitthawon		(substituted off) 46'
LW	18	Chanathip Songkrasin (c)		(substituted off) 88'
CF	10	Teerasil Dangda		(substituted off) 77'
Substitutions:
MF	8	Thitiphan Puangchan		(substituted on) 46'
FW	22	Supachai Chaided		(substituted on) 62'
MF	24	Worachit Kanitsribampen		(substituted on) 77'
MF	27	Weerathep Pomphan		(substituted on) 88'
DF	19	Tristan Do		(substituted on) 88'
Manager:
(Brazil) Alexandré Pölking

=== Second leg ===
==== Indonesia vs Singapore ====
25 December 2021
20:30

Indonesia	4–2 (a.e.t.)	Singapore
Ezra 11'; Arhan 87'; Shawal 91' (o.g.); Egy 105+2'	Report (AFFSZ); Report (AFF)	Song Ui-young 45+4'; Shahdan 74'

National Stadium, Kallang
Attendance: 9,982
Referee: Qasim Al-Hatmi (Oman)

Indonesia	Singapore

GK	23	Nadeo Argawinata
RB	14	Asnawi Mangkualam (c)
CB	19	Fachruddin Aryanto	(yellow card) 83'
CB	5	Rizky Ridho		(substituted off) 65'
LB	28	Alfeandra Dewangga		(substituted off) 107'
DM	13	Rachmat Irianto		(substituted off) 94'
RM	8	Witan Sulaeman
LM	12	Pratama Arhan	(yellow card) 88'
AM	15	Ricky Kambuaya		(substituted off) 66'
CF	20	Ramai Rumakiek		(substituted off) 66'
CF	7	Ezra Walian		(substituted off) 54'
Substitutions:
FW	29	Hanis Saghara Putra		(substituted on) 54'
DF	30	Elkan Baggott		(substituted on) 65'
FW	10	Egy Maulana Vikri		(substituted on) 66'
FW	25	Irfan Jaya		(substituted on) 66'
MF	6	Evan Dimas		(substituted on) 94'
MF	18	Kadek Agung		(substituted on) 107'
Manager:
(South Korea) Shin Tae-yong

GK	18	Hassan Sunny	(red card) 119'
RB	11	Hafiz Nor		(substituted off) 61'
CB	17	Irfan Fandi	(red card) 67'
CB	21	Safuwan Baharudin	(yellow card) 36' (yellow-red card) 45+2'
LB	8	Shahdan Sulaiman
DM	14	Hariss Harun (c)
RM	13	Zulqarnaen Suzliman		(substituted off) 93'
CM	16	Hami Syahin		(substituted off) 60'
LM	25	Nur Adam Abdullah		(substituted off) 106'
CF	15	Song Ui-young		(substituted off) 70'
CF	7	Amy Recha		(substituted off) 60'
Substitutions:
FW	9	Ikhsan Fandi		(substituted on) 60'
FW	20	Shawal Anuar	(yellow card) 85'	(substituted on) 60'
FW	10	Faris Ramli		(substituted on) 61'
DF	5	Amirul Adli		(substituted on) 70'
DF	4	Nazrul Nazari		(substituted on) 93'
DF	3	Tajeli Salamat		(substituted on) 106'
Manager:
(Japan) Tatsuma Yoshida

==== Thailand vs Vietnam ====
26 December 2021
20:30

Thailand	0–0	Vietnam
	Report (AFFSZ); Report (AFF)

National Stadium, Kallang
Attendance: 8,121
Referee: Ahmad Yaqoub Ibrahim (Jordan)

Thailand	Vietnam

GK	20	Chatchai Budprom		(substituted off) 33'
RB	15	Narubadin Weerawatnodom
CB	4	Manuel Bihr
CB	16	Phitiwat Sukjitthammakul
LB	3	Theerathon Bunmathan	(yellow card) 58'
DM	26	Kritsada Kaman
DM	6	Sarach Yooyen		(substituted off) 69'
CM	8	Thitiphan Puangchan	(yellow card) 35'	(substituted off) 46'
RF	14	Pathompol Charoenrattanapirom		(substituted off) 46'
CF	10	Teerasil Dangda		(substituted off) 83'
LF	18	Chanathip Songkrasin (c)
Substitutions:
GK	23	Siwarak Tedsungnoen		(substituted on) 33'
DF	5	Elias Dolah		(substituted on) 46'
MF	12	Thanawat Suengchitthawon		(substituted on) 46'
MF	28	Pokklaw Anan		(substituted on) 69'
FW	22	Supachai Chaided		(substituted on) 83'
Manager:
(Brazil) Alexandré Pölking

GK	23	Trần Nguyên Mạnh
CB	16	Nguyễn Thành Chung
CB	3	Quế Ngọc Hải (c)
CB	4	Bùi Tiến Dũng	(yellow card) 46'
RWB	13	Hồ Tấn Tài		(substituted off) 82'
LWB	7	Nguyễn Phong Hồng Duy		(substituted off) 54'
CM	19	Nguyễn Quang Hải
CM	14	Nguyễn Hoàng Đức
CM	20	Phan Văn Đức		(substituted off) 69'
CF	18	Hà Đức Chinh		(substituted off) 46'
CF	22	Nguyễn Tiến Linh	(yellow card) 88'
Substitutions:
FW	10	Nguyễn Công Phượng		(substituted on) 46'
FW	9	Nguyễn Văn Toàn		(substituted on) 54'
MF	11	Nguyễn Tuấn Anh		(substituted on) 69'	(substituted off) 82'
DF	27	Lê Văn Xuân		(substituted on) 82'
MF	5	Phạm Xuân Mạnh			(substituted on) 82'
Manager:
(South Korea) Park Hang-seo

== Final ==
Team 1	Agg.	Team 2	1st leg	2nd leg
Indonesia	2–6	Thailand	0–4	2–2

=== First leg ===
29 December 2021
20:30

Indonesia	0–4	Thailand
	Report (AFFSZ); Report (AFF)	Chanathip 2', 52'; Supachok 67'; Bordin 83'

National Stadium, Kallang
Attendance: 6,290
Referee: Shukri Al-Hunfush (Saudi Arabia)

Indonesia	Thailand

GK	23	Nadeo Argawinata
RB	14	Asnawi Mangkualam (c)
CB	19	Fachruddin Aryanto		(substituted off) 46'
CB	5	Rizky Ridho
LB	3	Edo Febriansah		(substituted off) 46'
CM	13	Rachmat Irianto		(substituted off) 63'
CM	28	Alfeandra Dewangga
RW	8	Witan Sulaeman
AM	15	Ricky Kambuaya		(substituted off) 63'
LW	25	Irfan Jaya		(substituted off) 73'
CF	27	Dedik Setiawan	(yellow card) 78'
Substitutions:
DF	30	Elkan Baggott		(substituted on) 46'
FW	9	Kushedya Hari Yudo		(substituted on) 46'
FW	10	Egy Maulana Vikri		(substituted on) 63'
FW	29	Hanis Saghara Putra		(substituted on) 63'
FW	20	Ramai Rumakiek		(substituted on) 73'
Manager:
(South Korea) Shin Tae-yong

GK	23	Siwarak Tedsungnoen		(substituted off) 75'
CB	13	Philip Roller
CB	5	Elias Dolah	(yellow card) 34'	(substituted off) 39'
CB	19	Tristan Do	(yellow card) 80'
CM	26	Kritsada Kaman
CM	16	Phitiwat Sukjitthammakul		(substituted off) 61'
CM	27	Weerathep Pomphan
RW	7	Supachok Sarachat
LW	18	Chanathip Songkrasin (c)		(substituted off) 75'
SS	11	Bordin Phala
CF	10	Teerasil Dangda		(substituted off) 61'
Substitutions:
MF	28	Pokklaw Anan		(substituted on) 39'
MF	8	Thitiphan Puangchan		(substituted on) 61'
FW	22	Supachai Chaided		(substituted on) 61'
MF	24	Worachit Kanitsribampen		(substituted on) 75'
GK	1	Kawin Thamsatchanan		(substituted on) 75'
Manager:
(Brazil) Alexandré Pölking

=== Second leg ===
1 January 2022
20:30

Thailand	2–2	Indonesia
Adisak 54'; Sarach 56'	Report (AFFSZ); Report (AFF)	Kambuaya 7'; Egy 80'

National Stadium, Kallang
Attendance: 7,429
Referee: Ahmed Faisal Al-Ali (Jordan)

Thailand	Indonesia

GK	23	Siwarak Tedsungnoen
CB	15	Narubadin Weerawatnodom
CB	25	Pawee Tanthatemee		(substituted off) 46'
CB	3	Theerathon Bunmathan	(yellow card) 90+4'
CM	26	Kritsada Kaman
CM	6	Sarach Yooyen		(substituted off) 85'
RW	7	Supachok Sarachat
AM	12	Thanawat Suengchitthawon		(substituted off) 46'
LW	18	Chanathip Songkrasin (c)	(yellow card) 75'
SS	11	Bordin Phala	(yellow card) 33'	(substituted off) 71'
CF	10	Teerasil Dangda		(substituted off) 46'
Substitutions:
MF	16	Phitiwat Sukjitthammakul		(substituted on) 46'
FW	9	Adisak Kraisorn		(substituted on) 46'
MF	27	Weerathep Pomphan	(yellow card) 52'	(substituted on) 46'
DF	13	Philip Roller		(substituted on) 71'
FW	17	Jenphob Phokhi		(substituted on) 85'
Manager:
(Brazil) Alexandré Pölking

GK	23	Nadeo Argawinata
CB	14	Asnawi Mangkualam (c)	(yellow card) 73'
CB	19	Fachruddin Aryanto
CB	12	Pratama Arhan
RM	8	Witan Sulaeman
CM	13	Rachmat Irianto		(substituted off) 74'
CM	28	Alfeandra Dewangga
LM	20	Ramai Rumakiek		(substituted off) 59'
RF	10	Egy Maulana Vikri
CF	27	Dedik Setiawan		(substituted off) 59'
LF	15	Ricky Kambuaya
Substitutions:
FW	25	Irfan Jaya		(substituted on) 59'
FW	29	Hanis Saghara Putra		(substituted on) 59'	(substituted off) 85'
MF	6	Evan Dimas		(substituted on) 74'
MF	17	Syahrian Abimanyu			(substituted on) 85'
Manager:
(South Korea) Shin Tae-yong
