= 2020 AFF Championship final =

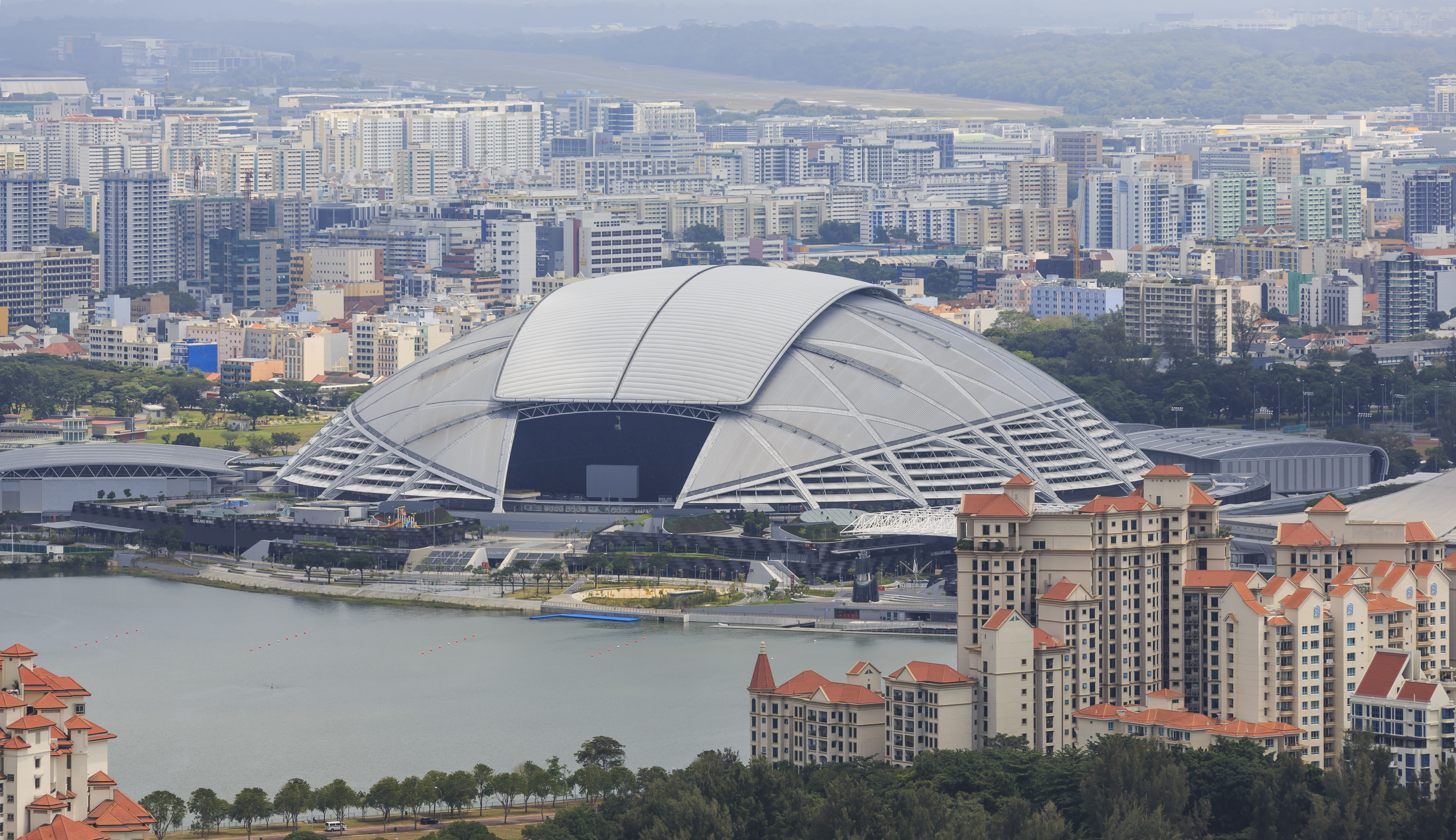
- National Stadium in Kallang, Central Region hosted the matches.
- Event: 2020 AFF Championship
Indonesia (Note: Due to non-compliance with conditions set by the World Anti-Doping Agency (WADA), Indonesia was not allowed to be represented by its national flag. The sanctions took effect in October 2021.)	Thailand (Note: Due to non-compliance with conditions set by the World Anti-Doping Agency (WADA), Thailand was not allowed to be represented by its national flag. The sanctions took effect in October 2021.)
2	6
- on aggregate

First leg
Indonesia	Thailand
0	4
- Date: 29 December 2021
- Venue: National Stadium, Kallang
- Referee: Shukri Al-Hunfush (Saudi Arabia)
- Attendance: 6,290

Second leg
Thailand	Indonesia
2	2
- Date: 1 January 2022
- Venue: National Stadium, Kallang
- Referee: Ahmed Faisal Al-Ali (Jordan)
- Attendance: 7,429

The 2020 AFF Championship final was the final of the 2020 AFF Championship. It was played between Indonesia and Thailand in two legs, both played at the National Stadium, Kallang, Singapore. The first leg was held on 29 December 2021 and the second leg took place on 1 January 2022. Thailand won a record-extending sixth title 6–2 on aggregate. This was the highest-scoring AFF Championship final, which also produced a larger margin of victory than any finals before.

Thailand won the first leg 4–0, the biggest defeat for either side in this fixture since their meeting at the 1985 Southeast Asian Games, when Thailand as the host country won 7–0 against Indonesia. With a four-goal margin of defeat, this was also the biggest defeat in an AFF Championship final, in any legged tie. The previous joint-biggest defeats were by a three-goal margin (4–1 in the 2000 single leg final and 3–0 in the first leg of the 2010 final), both of which coincidentally featured Indonesia as the losing side. In the second leg, Indonesia stroke first but conceded two in three minutes before equalising with just minutes to go as they avoided to become the first team to lose both legs of the final since themselves to Singapore in 2004.

== Background ==
The 2020 AFF Championship (officially known as the 2020 AFF Suzuki Cup for sponsorship reasons) was the 13th edition of the AFF Championship, the 13th edition of the football championship of nations affiliated to the ASEAN Football Federation (AFF), and the seventh as the AFF Suzuki Cup. The tournament was due to be held at the said year but was postponed due to the COVID-19 pandemic which started in early 2020.

This was the sixth AFF Championship final for Indonesia, having qualified and lost the 2000, 2002, 2004, 2010, and 2016 finals.

This was the ninth AFF Championship final for Thailand, having won the 1996, 2000, 2002, 2014, and 2016 finals, and lost in 2007, 2008, and 2012.

Both were teams with the most appearances in the AFF Championship finals; Thailand was leading the all-time championship table with five titles to their name. At the other hand, Indonesia had lost all five of their previous finals, two more than the second-worst, Thailand. They had met three times in the AFF Championship final, with Thailand winning in 2000, 2002, and 2016. In all competitions, Thailand won 38 meetings between the sides, Indonesia won 20, and 23 matches ended in draws – including those ended with penalties – prior to the final. Prior to the 2001 Southeast Asian Games, which saw age-group teams playing in place of senior teams ever since, both countries met in every edition of the games between 1977 and 1997. Among 12 matches, two were in the gold medal matches of 1991 and 1997, in which one side defeated the other on penalties.

Both countries played the final without their national flags due to non-compliance with conditions set by the World Anti-Doping Agency (WADA).

== Road to the final ==
Note: In all results below, the score of the finalist is given first (H: home; A: away). Home and away are administrative only, since all matches were played in Singapore.

Indonesia				Round	Thailand			
Opponent	Result			Group stage	Opponent	Result		
Cambodia	4–2			Matchday 1	Timor-Leste	2–0		
Laos	5–1			Matchday 2	Myanmar	4–0		
Vietnam	0–0			Matchday 3	Philippines	2–1		
Malaysia	4–1			Matchday 4	Singapore	2–0		
Group B winners: Pos / Team / Pld / Pts; 1 / Indonesia / 4 / 10; 2 / Vietnam / 4 / 10; 3 / Malaysia / 4 / 6; 4 / Cambodia / 4 / 3; 5 / Laos / 4 / 0; Source: AFF				Final standings	Group A winners: Pos / Team / Pld / Pts; 1 / Thailand / 4 / 12; 2 / Singapore (H) / 4 / 9; 3 / Philippines / 4 / 6; 4 / Myanmar / 4 / 3; 5 / Timor-Leste / 4 / 0; Source: AFF (H) Hosts			
Opponent	Agg.	1st leg	2nd leg	Knockout stage	Opponent	Agg.	1st leg	2nd leg
Singapore	5–3	1–1 (A)	4–2 (a.e.t.) (H)	Semi-finals	Vietnam	2–0	2–0 (A)	0–0 (H)

== Matches ==
=== First leg ===
29 December 2021
20:30

Indonesia	0–4	Thailand
	Report (AFFSZ); Report (AFF)	Chanathip 2', 52'; Supachok 67'; Bordin 83'

National Stadium, Kallang
Attendance: 6,290
Referee: Shukri Al-Hunfush (Saudi Arabia)

Indonesia	Thailand

GK	23	Nadeo Argawinata
RB	14	Asnawi Mangkualam (c)
CB	19	Fachruddin Aryanto		(substituted off) 46'
CB	5	Rizky Ridho
LB	3	Edo Febriansah		(substituted off) 46'
CM	13	Rachmat Irianto		(substituted off) 63'
CM	28	Alfeandra Dewangga
RW	8	Witan Sulaeman
AM	15	Ricky Kambuaya		(substituted off) 63'
LW	25	Irfan Jaya		(substituted off) 73'
CF	27	Dedik Setiawan	(yellow card) 78'
Substitutions:
DF	30	Elkan Baggott		(substituted on) 46'
FW	9	Kushedya Hari Yudo		(substituted on) 46'
FW	10	Egy Maulana Vikri		(substituted on) 63'
FW	29	Hanis Saghara Putra		(substituted on) 63'
FW	20	Ramai Rumakiek		(substituted on) 73'
Manager:
(South Korea) Shin Tae-yong

GK	23	Siwarak Tedsungnoen		(substituted off) 75'
CB	13	Philip Roller
CB	5	Elias Dolah	(yellow card) 34'	(substituted off) 39'
CB	19	Tristan Do	(yellow card) 80'
CM	26	Kritsada Kaman
CM	16	Phitiwat Sukjitthammakul		(substituted off) 61'
CM	27	Weerathep Pomphan
RW	7	Supachok Sarachat
LW	18	Chanathip Songkrasin (c)		(substituted off) 75'
SS	11	Bordin Phala
CF	10	Teerasil Dangda		(substituted off) 61'
Substitutions:
MF	28	Pokklaw Anan		(substituted on) 39'
MF	8	Thitiphan Puangchan		(substituted on) 61'
FW	22	Supachai Chaided		(substituted on) 61'
MF	24	Worachit Kanitsribampen		(substituted on) 75'
GK	1	Kawin Thamsatchanan		(substituted on) 75'
Manager:
(Brazil) Alexandré Pölking

=== Second leg ===
1 January 2022
20:30

Thailand	2–2	Indonesia
Adisak 54'; Sarach 56'	Report (AFFSZ); Report (AFF)	Kambuaya 7'; Egy 80'

National Stadium, Kallang
Attendance: 7,429
Referee: Ahmed Faisal Al-Ali (Jordan)

Thailand	Indonesia

GK	23	Siwarak Tedsungnoen
CB	15	Narubadin Weerawatnodom
CB	25	Pawee Tanthatemee		(substituted off) 46'
CB	3	Theerathon Bunmathan	(yellow card) 90+4'
CM	26	Kritsada Kaman
CM	6	Sarach Yooyen		(substituted off) 85'
RW	7	Supachok Sarachat
AM	12	Thanawat Suengchitthawon		(substituted off) 46'
LW	18	Chanathip Songkrasin (c)	(yellow card) 75'
SS	11	Bordin Phala	(yellow card) 33'	(substituted off) 71'
CF	10	Teerasil Dangda		(substituted off) 46'
Substitutions:
MF	16	Phitiwat Sukjitthammakul		(substituted on) 46'
FW	9	Adisak Kraisorn		(substituted on) 46'
MF	27	Weerathep Pomphan	(yellow card) 52'	(substituted on) 46'
DF	13	Philip Roller		(substituted on) 71'
FW	17	Jenphob Phokhi		(substituted on) 85'
Manager:
(Brazil) Alexandré Pölking

GK	23	Nadeo Argawinata
CB	14	Asnawi Mangkualam (c)	(yellow card) 73'
CB	19	Fachruddin Aryanto
CB	12	Pratama Arhan
RM	8	Witan Sulaeman
CM	13	Rachmat Irianto		(substituted off) 74'
CM	28	Alfeandra Dewangga
LM	20	Ramai Rumakiek		(substituted off) 59'
RF	10	Egy Maulana Vikri
CF	27	Dedik Setiawan		(substituted off) 59'
LF	15	Ricky Kambuaya
Substitutions:
FW	25	Irfan Jaya		(substituted on) 59'
FW	29	Hanis Saghara Putra		(substituted on) 59'	(substituted off) 85'
MF	6	Evan Dimas		(substituted on) 74'
MF	17	Syahrian Abimanyu			(substituted on) 85'
Manager:
(South Korea) Shin Tae-yong
