= Ezra Walian =

Indonesian footballer (born 1997)

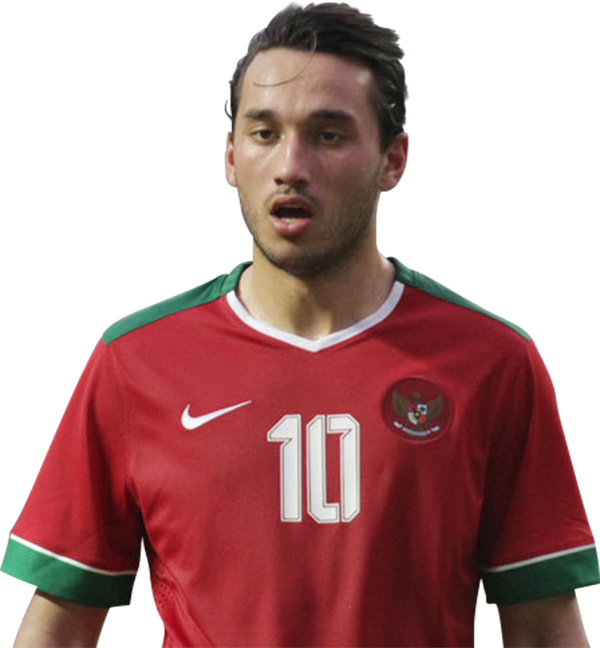
- Walian playing for Indonesia U23 in 2017

Personal information
- Full name: Ezra Harm Ruud Walian
- Date of birth: 22 October 1997 (age 29)
- Place of birth: Amsterdam, Netherlands
- Height: 1.82 m (6 ft 0 in)
- Positions: Forward; attacking midfielder

Team information
- Current team: Persik Kediri
- Number: 10

Youth career
- 2007–2008: Haarlem
- 2008–2012: AZ
- 2012–2016: Ajax

Senior career*
Years	Team	Apps	(Gls)
2016–2017	Jong Ajax	22	(3)
2017–2019	Almere City	15	(4)
2018–2019	→ RKC Waalwijk (loan)	14	(1)
2019–2020	PSM Makassar	19	(3)
2021–2024	Persib Bandung	78	(4)
2024–	Persik Kediri	44	(8)

International career
2012–2013	Netherlands U16	10	(6)
2013–2014	Netherlands U17	2	(5)
2017–2019	Indonesia U23	5	(1)
2017–	Indonesia	9	(3)
Medal record
Men's football
Representing Indonesia
Southeast Asian Games
Bronze medal – third place	2017 Kuala Lumpur	Team
AFF Championship
Runner-up	2020 Singapore	Team
- * Club domestic league appearances and goals as of 9 March 2026

Ezra Harm Ruud Walian (born 22 October 1997) is a professional footballer who plays as a forward or attacking midfielder for Super League club Persik Kediri. Born in the Netherlands, he represents the Indonesia national team.

== Club career ==
=== Ajax ===
Walian is a youth exponent from Ajax. He made his professional debut at Jong Ajax on 26 September 2016 in an Eerste Divisie game against FC Oss. He left Jong Ajax after contract ended on 30 June 2017.

In July and August 2017, Walian had trials with three English club sides Bolton Wanderers and West Ham United.

=== Almere City ===
On 29 August 2017 it was announced that Walian had signed with Ajax affiliates' Almere City for 2 years, competing in the Dutch Eerste Divisie. He made his debut in the Almere City FC game against Helmond Sport. On 6 October 2017, Walian scored his first goal for Almere City in the 76th minute against MVV Maastricht.

==== RKC Waalwijk (loan) ====
He was signed for RKC Waalwijk to play in the Eerste Divisie, on loan from Almere City. Walian made his debut on 24 August 2018 in a match against Den Bosch. On 17 November 2018, Walian scored his first goal for RKC Waalwijk in the 32nd minute against Helmond Sport.

=== PSM Makassar ===
On September 7, 2019, Walian signed three and a half years contract with Indonesian Liga 1 side PSM Makassar. He made his debut on 19 September 2019 in a match against Persikabo 1973. On 27 September 2019, Walian scored his first goal for PSM in a 3–1 lose over Persipura Jayapura at the Gelora Delta Stadium. On 16 October 2019, he scored in a 6–2 win over Arema. Walian made 19 league appearances and scored 3 goals for PSM Makassar.

=== Persib Bandung ===
He was announced to have signed a three-year contract with the West Java club on 14 March 2021 during Persib's 88th anniversary celebration He made his league debut on 4 September by starting in a 1–0 win against Barito Putera.

== International career ==
Walian represented the Netherlands at youth level, from the under-15s to under-19s, on 19 October 2013 while playing for the Netherlands U-17 team, he scored 5 goals in his debut against San Marino of the 2014 UEFA European Under-17 Championship qualifying round in a 12–0 win. He was eligible to represent the Netherlands or Indonesia at full international level through his parents; his mother being Dutch and his father Indonesian.

On 20 March 2017, Walian went through a naturalization process to play for Indonesia.

Walian was given his first call-up by Indonesia manager Luis Milla for a friendly against Myanmar on 21 March 2017. He made his debut for Indonesia after coming on as a substitute in the start of second half.

In November 2021, Walian was called up to the Indonesia national team in a friendly match in Turkey against Afghanistan and Myanmar by Shin Tae-yong. Walian scored his first international goal on 25 November 2021, in a 4–1 win against Myanmar. In December 2021, he was named in Indonesian's squad for the 2020 AFF Championship in Singapore. On 12 December 2021, Walian scored a goal against Laos in a 2020 AFF Championship group stage. On 25 December 2021, he scored again against Singapore in the second leg of semi-final in a 4–2 victory after extra-time.

== Personal life ==
Walian was born in the Netherlands to an Indonesian father and a Dutch mother.

On 18 May 2017, Walian officially obtained Indonesian citizenship.

== Career statistics ==
=== Club ===
As of match played 9 March 2026

Club	Season	League			Cup (Note: Includes KNVB Cup)		Continental		Other		Total	
Club	Season	Division	Apps	Goals	Apps	Goals	Apps	Goals	Apps	Goals	Apps	Goals
Jong Ajax	2016–17	Eerste Divisie	22	3	0	0	—		—		22	3
Almere City	2017–18	Eerste Divisie	15	4	2	0	—		—		17	4
RKC Waalwijk (loan)	2018–19	Eerste Divisie	14	1	2	0	—		—		16	1
PSM Makassar	2019	Liga 1	16	3	0	0	—		—		16	3
PSM Makassar	2020	Liga 1	3	0	0	0	—		—		3	0
PSM Makassar	Total		19	3	0	0	—		—		19	3
Persib Bandung	2021–22	Liga 1	20	1	0	0	—		6 (Note: Appearances in Menpora Cup)	3	26	4
Persib Bandung	2022–23	Liga 1	22	1	0	0	—		4 (Note: Appearances in Indonesia President's Cup)	0	26	1
Persib Bandung	2023–24	Liga 1	36	2	0	0	–		0	0	36	2
Persib Bandung	Total		78	4	0	0	—		10	3	88	7
Persik Kediri	2024–25	Liga 1	21	2	0	0	—		0	0	21	2
Persik Kediri	2025–26	Super League	23	6	0	0	—		0	0	23	6
Career total			192	23	4	0	0	0	10	3	206	26

=== International ===
As of match played 25 December 2021

Appearances and goals by national team and year
National team	Year	Apps	Goals
Indonesia	2017	1	0
Indonesia	2018	0	0
Indonesia	2019	0	0
Indonesia	2020	0	0
Indonesia	2021	8	3
Total		9	3

=== International goals ===
Indonesia

No.	Date	Venue	Opponent	Score	Result	Competition
1.	25 November 2021	Emirhan Sports Complex, Antalya, Turkey	Myanmar	4–0	4–1	Friendly
2.	12 December 2021	Bishan Stadium, Bishan, Singapore	Laos	4–1	5–1	2020 AFF Championship
3.	25 December 2021	National Stadium, Kallang, Singapore	Singapore	1–0	4–2 (a.e.t.)	2020 AFF Championship

== Honours ==
Ajax A1 (U-19)

- Eredivisie U-19: 2013–14, 2014–15, 2015–16

Jong Ajax

- Eerste Divisie runner-up: 2016–17

Persib Bandung

- Liga 1: 2023–24

Indonesia U-23

- SEA Games bronze medal: 2017

Indonesia

- AFF Championship runner-up: 2020

Individual

- Menpora Cup Best Eleven: 2021
- Liga 1 Goal of the Month: July 2023
- Super League Assist of the Month: January 2026

== See also ==
- List of Indonesia international footballers born outside Indonesia
