= 2020 AFF Championship =

Tournament details
- Host country: Singapore
- Dates: 5 December 2021 – 1 January 2022
- Teams: 10 (from 1 sub-confederation)
- Venues: 2 (in 1 host city)

Final positions
- Champions: Thailand (6th title)
- Runners-up: Indonesia

Tournament statistics
- Matches played: 26
- Goals scored: 88 (3.38 per match)
- Attendance: 103,423 (3,978 per match)
- Top scorer(s): (Malaysia) Safawi Rasid (Philippines) Bienvenido Marañón (Thailand) Chanathip Songkrasin (Thailand) Teerasil Dangda (4 goals each)
- Best player: (Thailand) Chanathip Songkrasin
- Best young player: (Indonesia) Pratama Arhan
- Fair play award: Indonesia

The 2020 AFF Championship (officially AFF Suzuki Cup 2020 for sponsorship reasons) was the 13th edition of the AFF Championship, the football championship of nations affiliated to the ASEAN Football Federation (AFF), the 7th and the last edition sponsored by Suzuki.

The final tournament was originally scheduled to run from 23 November to 31 December 2020. However, the tournament was postponed and rescheduled at least twice due to the COVID-19 pandemic; the tournament was first rescheduled to run from 11 April to 8 May 2021 and the schedule later pushed backed further to 5 December 2021 to 1 January 2022. Singapore was chosen as host of the tournament in a centralised location.

Vietnam were the defending champions, but were eliminated by their rivals, Thailand in the semi-finals. Thailand won the tournament by a 6–2 victory in the two-legged final against Indonesia to secure their sixth title.

== Format ==
The AFF Suzuki Cup 2020 was hosted in a centralized venue due to the ongoing COVID-19 pandemic in Southeast Asia. On 28 September 2021, it was announced that Singapore would host the tournament. Cambodia, Indonesia, Thailand and Vietnam also expressed interest in hosting the tournament.

In the group stage of the competition proper, ten teams were drawn in two groups of five with single round-robin format. The top two teams of each group advance to the semi-finals.

The organizers preferred to hold the tournament under its original format, which featured two-leg home-and-away games. Away goals rule was not applied for this tournament.

Up to five substitutions may be allowed as per recommendation of FIFA.

== Qualification ==
Qualified for AFF Championship Withdrew Did not enter Not an AFF member

Nine teams automatically qualified to the AFF Championship final tournament; they were separated into their respective pots based on their performance of the last two editions. Brunei and Timor-Leste who were the two lowest-performing teams were supposed to play a match where the winner will secure a spot to the final tournament but Brunei withdrew citing the COVID-19 pandemic. Australia applied to attend the 2020 AFF Championship but was rejected by the AFF.

Due to non-compliance with conditions set by the World Anti-Doping Agency (WADA), Thailand and Indonesia were not allowed to be represented by their national flags.

=== Qualified teams ===
Team	Appearance	Previous best performance
Cambodia	8th	Group Stage (1996, 2000, 2002, 2004, 2008, 2016, 2018)
Indonesia (Note: Due to non-compliance with conditions set by the World Anti-Doping Agency (WADA), Thailand and Indonesia were not allowed to be represented by their national flags. The sanctions took effect in October 2021. Thailand is represented by its national team logo while Indonesia is represented by its coat of arms.)	13th	Runners-up (2000, 2002, 2004, 2010, 2016)
Laos	12th	Group Stage (1996, 1998, 2000, 2002, 2004, 2007, 2008, 2010, 2012, 2014, 2018)
Malaysia	13th	Winners (2010)
Myanmar	13th	Fourth place / Semi-finalists (2004, 2016)
Philippines	12th	Semi-finalists (2010, 2012, 2014, 2018)
Singapore	13th	Winners (1998, 2004, 2007, 2012)
Thailand	13th	Winners (1996, 2000, 2002, 2014, 2016)
Timor-Leste	3rd	Group Stage (2004, 2018)
Vietnam	13th	Winners (2008, 2018)

== Draw ==
The draw for the 2020 AFF Championship was originally set to be held on 10 August 2021 in Singapore but due to the enhanced COVID-19 restrictions in the country, the draw was postponed. The draw was done virtually and held on 21 September 2021. The pot placements followed each teams progress in the previous two editions.

At the time of the draw, the identity of the national team that secured qualification was unknown, as it was supposed to be contested between Brunei and Timor Leste. Timor Leste qualified to the group stage after the withdrawal of Brunei from the qualification play-off.

Pot 1	Pot 2	Pot 3	Pot 4	Pot 5
1. Vietnam (2018 holders); 2. Thailand	3. Malaysia; 4. Myanmar	5. Philippines; 6. Indonesia	7. Singapore; 8. Cambodia	9. Laos; 10. Timor-Leste (Qualification round winner)

== Squads ==
Each team were allowed a preliminary squad of 50 players. A final squad of 30 players (three of whom must be goalkeepers) 23 players registered for each match.

== Officials ==
The following officials were chosen for the competition.

Referees

- (Bahrain) Ammar Ebrahim Mahfoodh
- (Jordan) Ahmed Faisal Al-Ali
- (Jordan) Ahmad Yaqoub Ibrahim
- (South Korea) Kim Dae-yong
- (South Korea) Kim Hee-gon
- (Malaysia) Nazmi Nasaruddin
- (Oman) Qasim Al-Hatmi
- (Oman) Yaqoob Abdul Baki
- (Qatar) Saoud Ali Al-Adba
- (Saudi Arabia) Shukri Al-Hunfush
- (Saudi Arabia) Mohammed Al-Hoaish
- (Singapore) Ahmad A'Qashah

Assistant referees

- (Bahrain) Salman Ebrahim
- (Indonesia) Nurhadi Sulchan
- (Jordan) Ahmand Mansour Samara Muhsen
- (Jordan) Hamzah Adel Abu-Obaid
- (South Korea) Park Kyun-yong
- (South Korea) Kang Dong-ho
- (Oman) Saif Talib Al-Ghafri
- (Oman) Abu Bakar Al-Amri
- (Qatar) Zahy Snaid Al-Shammari
- (Qatar) Jasem Abdulla Yousef
- (Saudi Arabia) Faisal Nasser Al-Qahtani
- (Thailand) Rawut Nakarit

== Venues ==
Singapore
Location of stadiums of the 2020 AFF Championship	Kallang	Bishan
Location of stadiums of the 2020 AFF Championship	National Stadium	Bishan Stadium
Location of stadiums of the 2020 AFF Championship	Capacity: 55,000	Capacity: 6,254

== Group stage ==
Tiebreakers

Ranking in each group was determined as follows:

1. Greater number of points obtained in all the group matches;
2. Goal difference in all the group matches;
3. Greater number of goals scored in all the group matches.

If two or more teams were equal on the basis on the above three criteria, the placement was determined as follows:

1. Result of the direct match between the teams concerned;
2. Penalty shoot-out if only two teams were tied, and they met in the last round of the group;
3. Drawing of lots by the Organising Committee.

=== Group A ===
Pos	Team	Pld	W	D	L	GF	GA	GD	Pts	Qualification
1	Thailand	4	4	0	0	10	1	+9	12	Advance to semi-finals
2	Singapore (H)	4	3	0	1	7	3	+4	9	Advance to semi-finals
3	Philippines	4	2	0	2	12	6	+6	6	
4	Myanmar	4	1	0	3	4	10	−6	3	
5	Timor-Leste	4	0	0	4	0	13	−13	0	Play qualification for the next edition

Source: AFF
(H) Hosts
5 December 2021
17:30

Timor-Leste	0–2	Thailand (Note: Due to non-compliance with conditions set by the World Anti-Doping Agency (WADA), Thailand was not allowed to be represented by its national flag. The sanctions took effect in October 2021.)
	Report (AFFSZ); Report (AFF)	Pathompol 51'; Supachok 81'

National Stadium, Kallang
Attendance: 2,432
Referee: Qasim Al-Hatmi (Oman)
5 December 2021
20:45

Singapore	3–0	Myanmar
Safuwan 34'; Ikhsan 39', 45+1'	Report (AFFSZ); Report (AFF)

National Stadium, Kallang
Attendance: 7,588
Referee: Ahmed Faisal Al-Ali (Jordan)

8 December 2021
17:30

Myanmar	2–0	Timor-Leste
Than Paing 16'; Maung Maung Lwin 50'	Report (AFFSZ); Report (AFF)

National Stadium, Kallang
Attendance: 970
Referee: Saoud Ali Al-Adba (Qatar)
8 December 2021
20:30

Philippines	1–2	Singapore
Nazari 69'	Report (AFFSZ); Report (AFF)	Hariss 61'; Faris 63'

National Stadium, Kallang
Attendance: 8,922
Referee: Kim Dae-yong (South Korea)

11 December 2021
17:30

Timor-Leste	0–7	Philippines
	Report (AFFSZ); Report (AFF)	Steuble 21'; Nazari 31'; Guirado 35'; Reichelt 40'; Nyholm 45'; Marañón 45+1'; Ingreso 78'

National Stadium, Kallang
Attendance: 420
Referee: Nazmi Nasaruddin (Malaysia)
11 December 2021
20:30

Thailand	4–0	Myanmar
Teerasil 23', 53' (pen.); Worachit 78'; Supachok 90+2'	Report (AFFSZ); Report (AFF)

National Stadium, Kallang
Attendance: 1,142
Referee: Shukri Al-Hunfush (Saudi Arabia)

14 December 2021
17:30

Philippines	1–2	Thailand
Reichelt 57'	Report (AFFSZ); Report (AFF)	Teerasil 26', 78' (pen.)

National Stadium, Kallang
Attendance: 2,559
Referee: Qasim Al-Hatmi (Oman)
14 December 2021
20:30

Singapore	2–0	Timor-Leste
Adam S. 4'; Shakir 70'	Report (AFFSZ); Report (AFF)

National Stadium, Kallang
Attendance: 8,518
Referee: Mohammed Al-Hoaish (Saudi Arabia)

18 December 2021
20:30

Thailand	2–0	Singapore
Dolah 31'; Supachai 45+2'	Report (AFFSZ); Report (AFF)

National Stadium, Kallang
Attendance: 9,540
Referee: Ahmad Yaqoub Ibrahim (Jordan)
18 December 2021
20:30

Myanmar	2–3	Philippines
Htet Phyo Wai 74', 86'	Report (AFFSZ); Report (AFF)	Marañón 16', 19', 45'

Bishan Stadium, Bishan
Attendance: 215
Referee: Mohammed Al-Hoaish (Saudi Arabia)

=== Group B ===
Pos	Team	Pld	W	D	L	GF	GA	GD	Pts	Qualification
1	Indonesia	4	3	1	0	13	4	+9	10	Advance to semi-finals
2	Vietnam	4	3	1	0	9	0	+9	10	Advance to semi-finals
3	Malaysia	4	2	0	2	8	8	0	6	
4	Cambodia	4	1	0	3	6	11	−5	3	
5	Laos	4	0	0	4	1	14	−13	0	

Source: AFF
6 December 2021
17:30

Cambodia	1–3	Malaysia
Rosib 90' (pen.)	Report (AFFSZ); Report (AFF)	Safawi 23' (pen.); Akhyar 61'; Kogileswaran 78'

Bishan Stadium, Bishan
Attendance: 518
Referee: Shukri Al-Hunfush (Saudi Arabia)
6 December 2021
20:30

Laos	0–2	Vietnam
	Report (AFFSZ); Report (AFF)	Nguyễn Công Phượng 26'; Phan Văn Đức 55'

Bishan Stadium, Bishan
Attendance: 812
Referee: Ahmad Yaqoub Ibrahim (Jordan)

9 December 2021
17:30

Malaysia	4–0	Laos
Safawi 7', 34', 80'; Shahrul 78'	Report (AFFSZ); Report (AFF)

Bishan Stadium, Bishan
Attendance: 427
Referee: Ammar Ebrahim Mahfoodh (Bahrain)
9 December 2021
20:30

Indonesia (Note: Due to non-compliance with conditions set by the World Anti-Doping Agency (WADA), Indonesia was not allowed to be represented by its national flag. The sanctions took effect in October 2021.)	4–2	Cambodia
Irianto 5', 33'; Evan 17'; Rumakiek 54'	Report (AFFSZ); Report (AFF)	Safy 37'; Mony Udom 60'

Bishan Stadium, Bishan
Referee: Yaqoob Abdul Baki (Oman)

12 December 2021
17:30

Laos	1–5	Indonesia
Kydavone 41'	Report (AFFSZ); Report (AFF)	Asnawi 23' (pen.); Irfan 34'; Witan 56'; Ezra 77'; Evan 84'

Bishan Stadium, Bishan
Attendance: 207
Referee: Kim Hee-gon (South Korea)
12 December 2021
20:30

Vietnam	3–0	Malaysia
Nguyễn Quang Hải 32'; Nguyễn Công Phượng 36'; Nguyễn Hoàng Đức 89'	Report (AFFSZ); Report (AFF)

Bishan Stadium, Bishan
Attendance: 976
Referee: Ahmed Faisal Al-Ali (Jordan)

15 December 2021
17:30

Cambodia	3–0	Laos
Vathanaka 31', 41'; Chanthea 74'	Report (AFFSZ); Report (AFF)

Bishan Stadium, Bishan
Attendance: 129
Referee: Ahmad A'Qashah (Singapore)
15 December 2021
20:30

Indonesia	0–0	Vietnam
	Report (AFFSZ); Report (AFF)

Bishan Stadium, Bishan
Attendance: 928
Referee: Kim Dae-yong (South Korea)

19 December 2021
20:30

Vietnam	4–0	Cambodia
Nguyễn Tiến Linh 3', 27'; Bùi Tiến Dũng 55'; Nguyễn Quang Hải 57'	Report (AFFSZ); Report (AFF)

Bishan Stadium, Bishan
Attendance: 909
Referee: Yaqoob Abdul Baki (Oman)
19 December 2021
20:30

Malaysia	1–4	Indonesia
Kogileswaran 13'	Report (AFFSZ); Report (AFF)	Irfan 36', 43'; Arhan 50'; Baggott 82'

National Stadium, Kallang
Attendance: 7,082
Referee: Ammar Ebrahim Mahfoodh (Bahrain)

== Knockout stage ==
=== Bracket ===
Semi-finals
A2	Singapore	1	2	3
B1	Indonesia (a.e.t.)	1	4	5
B2	Vietnam	0	0	0
A1	Thailand	2	0	2

Finals
B1	Indonesia	0	2	2
A1	Thailand	4	2	6

=== Semi-finals ===
Team 1	Agg.	Team 2	1st leg	2nd leg
Singapore	3–5	Indonesia	1–1	2–4 (a.e.t.)
Vietnam	0–2	Thailand	0–2	0–0

==== First leg ====
22 December 2021
20:30

Singapore	1–1	Indonesia
Ikhsan 70'	Report (AFFSZ); Report (AFF)	Witan 28'

National Stadium, Kallang
Attendance: 9,952
Referee: Kim Hee-gon (South Korea)
23 December 2021
20:30

Vietnam	0–2	Thailand
	Report (AFFSZ); Report (AFF)	Chanathip 14', 23'

National Stadium, Kallang
Attendance: 7,355
Referee: Saoud Ali Al-Adba (Qatar)

==== Second leg ====
25 December 2021
20:30

Indonesia	4–2 (a.e.t.)	Singapore
Ezra 11'; Arhan 87'; Shawal 91' (o.g.); Egy 105+2'	Report (AFFSZ); Report (AFF)	Song Ui-young 45+4'; Shahdan 74'

National Stadium, Kallang
Attendance: 9,982
Referee: Qasim Al-Hatmi (Oman)

Indonesia won 5–3 on aggregate.

26 December 2021
20:30

Thailand	0–0	Vietnam
	Report (AFFSZ); Report (AFF)

National Stadium, Kallang
Attendance: 8,121
Referee: Ahmad Yaqoub Ibrahim (Jordan)

Thailand won 2–0 on aggregate.

=== Final ===
Team 1	Agg.	Team 2	1st leg	2nd leg
Indonesia	2–6	Thailand	0–4	2–2

==== First leg ====
29 December 2021
20:30

Indonesia	0–4	Thailand
	Report (AFFSZ); Report (AFF)	Chanathip 2', 52'; Supachok 67'; Bordin 83'

National Stadium, Kallang
Attendance: 6,290
Referee: Shukri Al-Hunfush (Saudi Arabia)

==== Second leg ====
1 January 2022
20:30

Thailand	2–2	Indonesia
Adisak 54'; Sarach 56'	Report (AFFSZ); Report (AFF)	Kambuaya 7'; Egy 80'

National Stadium, Kallang
Attendance: 7,429
Referee: Ahmed Faisal Al-Ali (Jordan)

Thailand won 6–2 on aggregate.

== Statistics ==
=== Winner ===
2020 AFF Championship

Thailand
6th title

=== Awards ===
Most Valuable Player	Young Player of the Tournament	Top Scorer Award	Fair Play Award
(Thailand) Chanathip Songkrasin	(Indonesia) Pratama Arhan	(Malaysia) Safawi Rasid (Philippines) Bienvenido Marañón (Thailand) Chanathip Songkrasin (Thailand) Teerasil Dangda	Indonesia

=== Goalscorers ===
There were 88 goals scored in 26 matches, for an average of 3.38 goals per match.

4 goals

- (Malaysia) Safawi Rasid
- (Philippines) Bienvenido Marañón
- (Thailand) Chanathip Songkrasin
- (Thailand) Teerasil Dangda

3 goals

- (Indonesia) Irfan Jaya
- (Singapore) Ikhsan Fandi
- (Thailand) Supachok Sarachat

2 goals

- (Cambodia) Chan Vathanaka
- (Indonesia) Evan Dimas
- (Indonesia) Egy Maulana Vikri
- (Indonesia) Ezra Walian
- (Indonesia) Pratama Arhan
- (Indonesia) Rachmat Irianto
- (Indonesia) Witan Sulaeman
- (Malaysia) Kogileswaran Raj
- (Myanmar) Htet Phyo Wai
- (Philippines) Amin Nazari
- (Philippines) Patrick Reichelt
- (Vietnam) Nguyễn Công Phượng
- (Vietnam) Nguyễn Quang Hải
- (Vietnam) Nguyễn Tiến Linh

1 goal

- (Cambodia) Prak Mony Udom
- (Cambodia) Sath Rosib
- (Cambodia) Sieng Chanthea
- (Cambodia) Yue Safy
- (Indonesia) Asnawi Mangkualam
- (Indonesia) Elkan Baggott
- (Indonesia) Ramai Rumakiek
- (Indonesia) Ricky Kambuaya
- (Laos) Kydavone Souvanny
- (Malaysia) Akhyar Rashid
- (Malaysia) Shahrul Saad
- (Myanmar) Maung Maung Lwin
- (Myanmar) Than Paing
- (Philippines) Ángel Guirado
- (Philippines) Kevin Ingreso
- (Philippines) Jesper Nyholm
- (Philippines) Martin Steuble
- (Singapore) Adam Swandi
- (Singapore) Faris Ramli
- (Singapore) Hariss Harun
- (Singapore) Safuwan Baharudin
- (Singapore) Shahdan Sulaiman
- (Singapore) Shakir Hamzah
- (Singapore) Song Ui-young
- (Thailand) Adisak Kraisorn
- (Thailand) Bordin Phala
- (Thailand) Elias Dolah
- (Thailand) Pathompol Charoenrattanapirom
- (Thailand) Sarach Yooyen
- (Thailand) Supachai Chaided
- (Thailand) Worachit Kanitsribampen
- (Vietnam) Bùi Tiến Dũng
- (Vietnam) Nguyễn Hoàng Đức
- (Vietnam) Phan Văn Đức

1 own goal

- (Singapore) Shawal Anuar (playing against Indonesia)

Source: AFF

=== Discipline ===
In the final tournament, a player was suspended for the subsequent match in the competition for either getting red card or accumulating two yellow cards in two different matches.

Player	Offences	Suspensions
(Cambodia) Ken Chansopheak	(yellow card) in Group B v Malaysia; (yellow card) in Group B v Vietnam	Team already eliminated from tournament
(Indonesia) Ramai Rumakiek	(yellow card) in Group B v Cambodia; (yellow card) in Group B v Malaysia	Semi-finals 1st-leg v Singapore
(Indonesia) Pratama Arhan	(yellow card) in Semi-finals 1st-leg v Singapore; (yellow card) in Semi-finals 2nd-leg v Singapore	Finals 1st-leg v Thailand
(Laos) Aphixay Thanakhanty	(yellow card) in Group B v Malaysia; (yellow card) in Group B v Indonesia	Group B v Cambodia
(Myanmar) Nyein Chan	(yellow card) in Group A v Singapore; (yellow card) in Group A v Philippines	Team already eliminated from tournament
(Philippines) Stephan Schröck	(yellow card) in Group A v Singapore; (yellow card) in Group A v Thailand	Group A v Myanmar
(Philippines) Martin Steuble	(yellow card) in Group A v Thailand; (yellow card) in Group A v Myanmar	Team already eliminated from tournament
(Singapore) Safuwan Baharudin	(yellow card) in Semi-finals 1st-leg v Indonesia; (yellow card) (yellow-red card) in Semi-finals 2nd-leg v Indonesia	Team already eliminated from tournament
(Singapore) Irfan Fandi	(red card) in Semi-finals 2nd-leg v Indonesia	Team already eliminated from tournament
(Singapore) Hassan Sunny	(red card) in Semi-finals 2nd-leg v Indonesia	Team already eliminated from tournament
(Thailand) Theerathon Bunmathan	(yellow card) in Semi-finals 1st leg v Vietnam; (yellow card) in Semi-finals 2nd-leg v Vietnam	Finals 1st-leg v Indonesia

In addition, 4 Indonesian players (Elkan Baggott, Victor Igbonefo, Rizky Ridho and Rizky Dwi Febrianto) were barred from the 2nd leg of the Indonesia-Thailand Final on 1 January 2022 for breaching COVID-19 safety measures by leaving the team hotel without authorisation.

=== Tournament teams ranking ===
This table will show the ranking of teams throughout the tournament.

Pos	Team	Pld	W	D	L	GF	GA	GD	Pts	Final result
1	Thailand	8	6	2	0	18	3	+15	20	Champion
2	Indonesia	8	4	3	1	20	13	+7	15	Runner-up
3	Vietnam	6	3	2	1	9	2	+7	11	Semi-final
4	Singapore	6	3	1	2	10	8	+2	10	Semi-final
5	Philippines	4	2	0	2	12	6	+6	6	Eliminated in group stage
6	Malaysia	4	2	0	2	8	8	0	6	Eliminated in group stage
7	Cambodia	4	1	0	3	6	11	−5	3	Eliminated in group stage
8	Myanmar	4	1	0	3	4	10	−6	3	Eliminated in group stage
9	Laos	4	0	0	4	1	14	−13	0	Eliminated in group stage
10	Timor-Leste	4	0	0	4	0	13	−13	0	Eliminated in group stage

Source: AFF

== Marketing ==
=== Matchballs ===
The official ball for AFF Suzuki Cup 2020 is the ASEAN PULSE, which is sponsored by Warrix.

=== Sponsorship ===
Title sponsor	Official sponsors	Official supporters
Suzuki	Oppo; Bioré; G-Shock; Midea; Yanmar	Acecook; Coocaa; Fuji Electric; Herbalife Nutrition; Jinro; Mitsubishi Electric; Pinaco; TMGM

== Media coverage ==
2020 AFF Championship television broadcasters in Southeast Asia
Country	Broadcast network	Television	Radio	Streaming
Brunei	RTB	RTB Aneka	—N/a	—N/a
Cambodia	Smart Axiata	Hang Meas HDTV		
Indonesia	MNC Media, Emtek	RCTI (Indonesian matches only), iNews (FTA), Champions TV (Pay)		RCTI+, Vision+, Vidio
Laos	Next Media			
Malaysia	Astro, RTM	Astro Arena, Sukan RTM		
Myanmar	Next Media			
Philippines	TAP DMV	Premier Sport (Pay)		TAP Go
Singapore	Mediacorp			meWATCH
Thailand	BBTV	CH7		Bugaboo, AIS Play
Timor-Leste	RTTL	TVTL		
Vietnam	VTV, Next Media	VTV5, VTV6	On 365 FM	TV360, VTVcab ON, FPT Play
2020 AFF Championship international television broadcasters
International	YouTube			AFF Suzuki Cup (unsold markets only)
Hong Kong	Hong Kong Cable Television		—N/a	
South Korea	Seoul Broadcasting System	SBS, SBS Sports (Indonesian and Vietnamese matches only)	—N/a	

== Notes ==
Sources

- Thailand: "Thailand loses right to host tournaments". Bangkok Post. Bangkok Post Public Co. Ltd. "The country has also been denied the right to display its national flag at any such events (international football events).""WADA confirms non-compliance of five Anti-Doping Organizations (7 October 2021)". World Anti-Doping Agency. 7 October 2021.
- Indonesia: "Chairman Of PSSI: Regarding The Flag At AFF 2020, We Will Follow Whatever The Decision Is". VOI. 24 November 2021."WADA confirms non-compliance of five Anti-Doping Organizations (7 October 2021)". World Anti-Doping Agency. 7 October 2021.
