= Coocaa =

China-based smart TV brand

- Industry: Smart TV
- Founded: 2006
- Headquarters: Shenzhen
- Key people: Wang Zhiguo (CEO)
- Products: Internet TVs; Coocaa OS
- Parent: Skyworth
- Website: www.coocaa.com

Coocaa (simplified Chinese: 酷开; traditional Chinese: 酷開; stylised as COOCAA), also known as Kukai, is a China-based smart TV brand that was founded in 2006. It was sequentially invested by iQIYI, Tencent, Baidu, and focuses on AIoTV. Owned by Shenzhen Skyworth-RGB Electronic Co., Ltd., its TV products feature Dolby Vision and full screen.

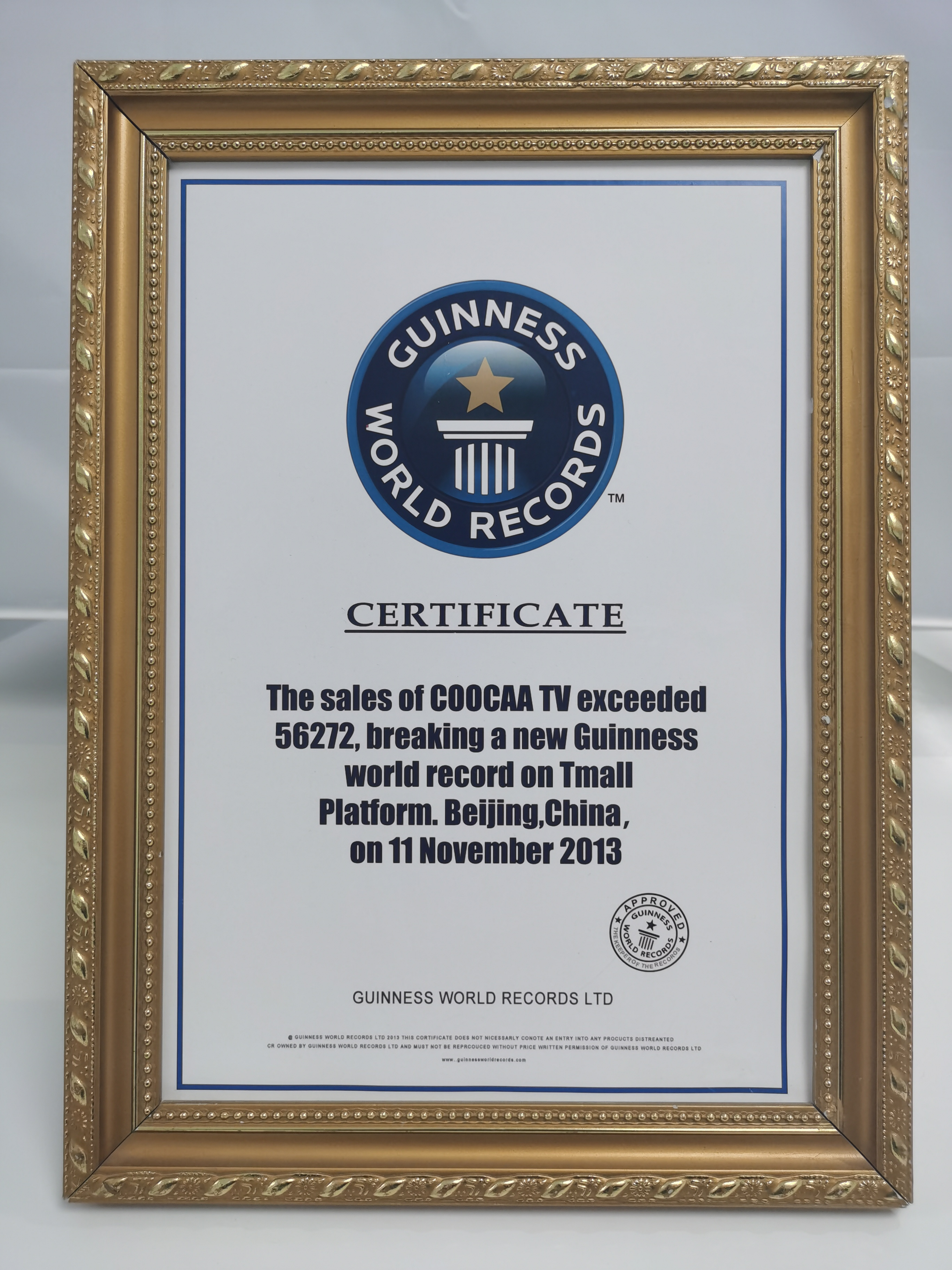
In 2013, Coocaa set a new Guinness World Sales Record

With headquarters in Shenzhen, Coocaa has ventured into Philippines and Malaysia. It was an official partner of the 2019 SEA Games. In November 2019, Coocaa attended the World TV Day event. The brand also has its own operating system called "Coocaa OS".

== History ==
Coocaa TV shipments exceeded 1 million units in 2015. In June 2017, Tencent invested HK$344.28 million to acquire a 7.7% stake in Coocaa. In March 2018, Baidu invested $159.70 million to obtain an 11% stake in Coocaa.

As of April 2020, the total number of users of the Coocaa System amounted to approximately 50 million users, this figure reached 80 million up to October.
