= Philip Roller =

Footballer (born 1994)

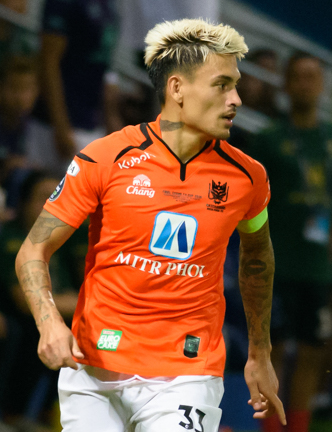
- Roller playing for Ratchaburi Mitr Phol in 2019

Personal information
- Full name: Philip Roller
- Date of birth: 10 June 1994 (age 32)
- Place of birth: Munich, Germany
- Height: 1.83 m (6 ft 0 in)
- Positions: Right-back; right winger

Youth career
- 2004–2007: 1.FC Eislingen
- 2008–2011: SSV Ulm
- 2011–2012: Grasshoppers
- 2013: Stuttgarter Kickers

Senior career*
| Years | Team | Apps | (Gls) |
| 2013–2014 | FV Illertissen | 0 | (0) |
| 2014 | TSV Grunbach | 3 | (0) |
| 2014–2015 | SVN Zweibrücken | 10 | (0) |
| 2015 | SC Pfullendorf | 15 | (1) |
| 2015–2017 | Austria Lustenau | 13 | (0) |
| 2017–2021 | Ratchaburi Mitr Phol | 122 | (23) |
| 2021–2023 | Port | 35 | (2) |
| Total | | 198 | (26) |

International career^{‡}
| 2017–2022 | Thailand | 16 | (2) |
Medal record
Thailand
Asean Football Championship
| Winner | AFF Suzuki Cup 2020 | 2020 |
- * Club domestic league appearances and goals as of 22 March 2022 ‡ National team caps and goals as of 24 March 2022

Philip Roller (Thai: ฟิลิป โรลเลอร์, born 10 June 1994) is a former professional footballer who plays as a right-back or a right winger. Born in Germany, he plays for the Thailand national team.

== Club career ==
Roller began playing football with local side TSV Bad Boll in Baden-Württemberg, Germany. He played in the youth system of 1. FC Eislingen, VfL Kirchheim/Teck, SSV Ulm, Grasshopper Club Zürich and Stuttgarter Kickers but never joined their senior sides. Roller would play in the Oberliga and Regionalliga before signing with SC Austria Lustenau where he made 13 Austrian Football First League appearances.

=== Ratchaburi Mitr Phol ===
In 2017, Roller moved to Thailand, joining Ratchaburi Mitr Phol a few weeks before making his international debut.

== International career ==
Roller is eligible to play international football for the Thailand national team through his Thai mother.

In 2017 he was in the squad of Thailand for 2017 King's Cup

In 2021, he was called up by Alexandré Pölking to play for Thailand at the 2020 AFF Championship.

== Career statistics ==
As of 24 March 2022

Appearances and goals by national team and year
| National team | Year | Apps | Goals |
|---|---|---|---|
| Thailand | 2017 | 2 | 0 |
| Thailand | 2018 | 9 | 1 |
| Thailand | 2021 | 2 | 0 |
| Thailand | 2022 | 3 | 1 |
| Total | | 16 | 2 |

Scores and results list Thailand's goal tally first, score column indicates score after each Roller goal.

List of international goals scored by Philip Roller
| No. | Date | Venue | Opponent | Score | Result | Competition |
|---|---|---|---|---|---|---|
| 1 | 11 October 2018 | Mong Kok Stadium, Mong Kok, Hong Kong | Hong Kong | 1–0 | 1–0 | Friendly |
| 2 | 24 March 2022 | Chonburi Stadium, Chonburi, Thailand | Nepal | 1–0 | 2–0 | Friendly |

== Honours ==
Thailand

- AFF Championship: 2020
- King's Cup: 2017

Individual

- Thai League 1 Player of the Month: March 2021
- Thai League 1 Best XI: 2020–21
