= Kritsada Kaman =

Thai footballer

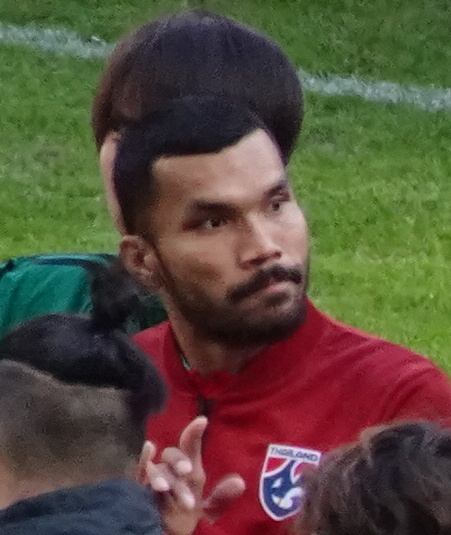
- Kritsada playing for Thailand in 2024

Personal information
- Full name: Kritsada Kaman
- Date of birth: 18 March 1999 (age 27)
- Place of birth: Trat, Thailand
- Height: 1.76 m (5 ft 9 in)
- Positions: Defensive midfielder; centre-back

Team information
- Current team: BG Pathum United
- Number: 5

Youth career
- 2012–2015: Chonburi

Senior career*
| Years | Team | Apps | (Gls) |
| 2015–2023 | Chonburi | 142 | (7) |
| 2015–2016 | → Phan Thong (loan) | 19 | (0) |
| 2024– | BG Pathum United | 64 | (2) |

International career^{‡}
| 2016–2018 | Thailand U19 | 3 | (0) |
| 2019–2022 | Thailand U23 | 19 | (0) |
| 2021– | Thailand | 41 | (1) |
Medal record
Men's football
Representing Thailand
FIFA ASEAN Cup
| Runner-up | 2026 Indonesia | Team |
AFF Championship
| Winner | AFF Suzuki Cup 2020 | Team |
| Winner | AFF Mitsubishi Electric Cup 2022 | Team |
AFF U-19 Youth Championship
| Winner | AFF U-18 Youth Championship 2017 | Team |
- * Club domestic league appearances and goals as of 6 June 2026 ‡ National team caps and goals as of 5 October 2026

Kritsada Kaman (Thai: กฤษดา กาแมน, born 18 March 1999) is a Thai professional footballer who plays as a defensive midfielder or a centre-back for Thai League 1 club BG Pathum United and the Thailand national team.

== Club career ==
=== Chonburi ===
Kritsada learned to play football in the youth team of the first division club Chonburi. He also signed his first professional contract in 2015.

In 2017, Kritsada returned to Chonburi after the loan.

After the end of the 2021–22 season, Kritsada was voted 'Young Player of the Year'.

==== Phan Thong (loan) ====
From 2015 to 2016, Kritsada was loaned to third division club Phan Thong.

=== BG Pathum United ===
After 142 league games, Kritsada moved to BG Pathum United, which also plays in the first division, at the end of December 2023. In his first season, he won the 2023–24 Thai League Cup with the club.

== International career ==
In November 2021, Kritsada was called up to the Thailand senior team for the first time by head coach Alexandré Pölking as one of the 30 players for the 2020 AFF Championship in Singapore. He made a debut for the team on 5 December 2021, playing the match for 90 minutes as a centre back in a 2–0 victory against Timor-Leste in the group stage.

Kritsada scores his first goal for the Thailand senior team in a friendly match against Kuwait on 5 June 2026. He scored a long-range shot that made Thailand lead 2-0, in a game that ended 2-2.

== Personal life ==
Kritsada came from a Thai Muslim family from Trat. His nickname ‘Laeh’ originates from the Arabic name Saleh.

== International statistics ==
=== International ===
| National team | Year | Apps | Goals |
|---|---|---|---|
| Thailand | 2021 | 6 | 0 |
| Thailand | 2022 | 9 | 0 |
| Thailand | 2023 | 15 | 0 |
| Thailand | 2024 | 4 | 0 |
| Thailand | 2026 | 7 | 1 |
| Thailand | Total | 41 | 1 |

== International goals ==
Scores and results list Thailand's goal tally first.

| No. | Date | Venue | Opponent | Score | Result | Competition |
|---|---|---|---|---|---|---|
| 1. | 5 June 2026 | True BG Stadium, Pathum Thani, Thailand | Kuwait | 2–0 | 2–2 | Friendly |

== Honours ==
=== Club ===
==== Chonburi ====
- Thai FA Cup runners-up: 2020–21

==== BG Pathum United ====
- Thai League Cup: 2023–24

=== International ===
Thailand

- AFF Championship: 2020, 2022

Thailand U-19

- AFF U-19 Youth Championship: 2017

=== Individual ===
- FA Thailand Young player of the Year: 2021–22
- AFF Championship Best XI: 2020, 2022
- ASEAN Club Championship: Allstar XI 2024–25
