= Ramai Rumakiek =

Indonesian footballer

Personal information
- Full name: Ramai Melvin Rumakiek
- Date of birth: 19 April 2002 (age 24)
- Place of birth: Jayapura, Indonesia
- Height: 1.70 m (5 ft 7 in)
- Position: Winger

Team information
- Current team: Persipura Jayapura
- Number: 23

Youth career
- 2018–2020: Persipura Jayapura

Senior career*
Years	Team	Apps	(Gls)
2021–	Persipura Jayapura	82	(41)
2023	→ Dewa United (loan)	9	(0)

International career
2021–2023	Indonesia U23	8	(1)
2021–2022	Indonesia	12	(3)
Medal record
Men's football
Representing Indonesia
AFF Championship
Runner-up	2020 Singapore	Team
- * Club domestic league appearances and goals as of 26 September 2026

Ramai Melvin Rumakiek (born 19 April 2002) is an Indonesian professional footballer who plays as a winger for Championship club Persipura Jayapura.

== Club career ==
=== Persipura Jayapura ===
He was signed for Persipura Jayapura to play in Liga 1 in the 2021 season. Ramai made his first-team debut on 28 August 2021 in a match against Persita Tangerang at the Pakansari Stadium, Cibinong. He also scored his first goal for the team in the 16th minute.

Ramai give assists a goal by Yohanes Pahabol in Persipura's 4–2 win over PSS Sleman on 20 March 2022. Four days later, Ramai scored his second league goal for the club, scoring in injury time of second half in a 0–4 win over PSIS Semarang at Ngurah Rai Stadium. Ramai finished the season with only 2 goals and 1 assist in 13 league appearances, Persipura Jayapura was relegated to Liga 2 next season, so this had a direct effect on the composition of their squad, many of the players then decided to move clubs, Ramai was rumored to have been approached by Persib Bandung who became his next career club in Liga 1.

Persipura's manager Yan Mandenas announced that Ramai will remain with Persipura in 2022–23 Liga 2, he is still loyal to Persipura Jayapura because he has an unfinished contract. On 29 August, he started his match in the 2022–23 Liga 2 season for Persipura in a 4–0 home win over Kalteng Putra. On 3 September, Ramai scored his first league goal of the season in a 2–1 lose over Persiba Balikpapan. A week later, he scored in a 1–2 win over Sulut United. Eight days later, Ramai scored the winning goal in a 1–0 win over Deltras at Lukas Enembe Stadium, the latter result saw Persipura move to 1st position in the league table of east region.

==== Loan to Dewa United ====
On 25 January 2023, Ramai joined Dewa United on loan for the remainder of the 2022-23 Liga 1 season. On 28 January, Ramai made his league debut by substituted Natanael Siringoringo in the 60th minute in a 1–1 draw against Bhayangkara.

== International career ==
He made his official international debut on 7 October 2021, against Chinese Taipei, scoring his first international goal in a 2023 AFC Asian Cup qualification match. In November 2021, Rumakiek was called up to the Indonesia national team in a friendly match in Turkey against Afghanistan and Myanmar by Shin Tae-yong. In December 2021, he was named in Indonesian's squad for the 2020 AFF Championship in Singapore. Rumakiek scored a goal against Cambodia in a 2020 AFF Championship group stage.

In September 2023, Rumakiek got a call up by Indra Sjafri to the Indonesia U-23 squad for the 2022 Asian Games tournament. On 19 September 2023, he scored a goal against Kyrgyzstan in a 2–0 win.

== Personal life ==
He is the younger brother of David Rumakiek, who is also a footballer.

== Career statistics ==
=== Club ===
As of 26 September 2026.

Club	Season	League			Cup		Continental		Other		Total	
Club	Season	Division	Apps	Goals	Apps	Goals	Apps	Goals	Apps	Goals	Apps	Goals
Persipura Jayapura	2021	Liga 1	13	2	0	0	–		0	0	13	2
Persipura Jayapura	2022–23	Liga 2	6	3	0	0	–		0	0	6	3
Persipura Jayapura	2023–24	Liga 2	14	10	0	0	–		0	0	14	10
Persipura Jayapura	2024–25	Liga 2	20	22	0	0	–		0	0	20	22
Persipura Jayapura	2025–26	Championship	26	4	0	0	–		0	0	26	4
Persipura Jayapura	2026–27	Championship	3	0	0	0	–		0	0	3	0
Persipura Jayapura	Total		82	41	0	0	–		0	0	82	41
Dewa United (loan)	2022–23	Liga 1	9	0	0	0	–		0	0	9	0
Career total			91	41	0	0	0	0	0	0	91	41

=== International ===
As of match played 30 January 2022

Appearances and goals by national team and year
National team	Year	Apps	Goals
Indonesia	2021	9	2
Indonesia	2022	3	1
Total		12	3

=== International goals ===
International under-23 goals

Goal	Date	Venue	Opponent	Score	Result	Competition
1.	19 September 2023	Zhejiang Normal University East Stadium, Jinhua, China	Kyrgyzstan	1–0	2–0	2022 Asian Games GS

International senior goals

No.	Date	Venue	Opponent	Score	Result	Competition
1.	7 October 2021	Buriram Stadium, Buriram, Thailand	Chinese Taipei	1–0	2–1	2023 AFC Asian Cup qualification
2.	9 December 2021	Bishan Stadium, Bishan, Singapore	Cambodia	4–1	4–2	2020 AFF Championship
3.	30 January 2022	Kapten I Wayan Dipta Stadium, Gianyar, Indonesia	Timor-Leste	2–0	3–0	Friendly

== Honours ==
=== International ===
Indonesia

- AFF Championship runner-up: 2020

Individual

- Liga 2 Top Goalscorer: 2024–25
