= Pathompol Charoenrattanapirom =

Thai footballer (born 1994)

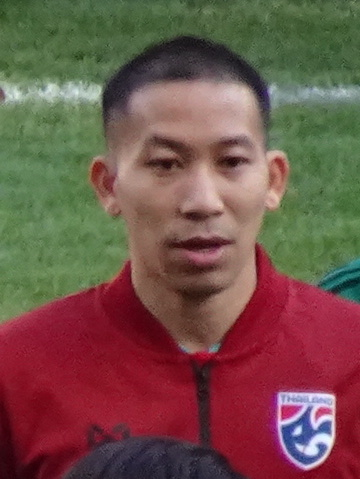

Personal information
- Full name: Pathompol Charoenrattanapirom
- Date of birth: 21 April 1994 (age 32)
- Place of birth: Bangkok, Thailand
- Height: 1.73 m (5 ft 8 in)
- Position: Winger

Youth career
- 2007–2012: Assumption College Thonburi

Senior career*
Years	Team	Apps	(Gls)
2012–2016	Muangthong United	6	(0)
2012	→ Assumption United (loan)	32	(8)
2013	→ Nakhon Nayok (loan)	18	(10)
2014	→ Samut Songkhram (loan)	8	(0)
2016	Pattaya United	12	(2)
2017–2020	Chiangrai United	26	(2)
2018–2020	→ Police Tero (loan)	42	(3)
2021–2023	BG Pathum United	46	(11)
2023	→ Port (loan)	12	(0)
2023–2025	Port	37	(3)
2025	Buriram United	8	(0)
2026–	Ayutthaya United	0	(0)

International career
2021–2024	Thailand	24	(1)
Medal record
Thailand
Asean Football Championship
Winner	AFF Suzuki Cup 2020	2020
- * Club domestic league appearances and goals as of 30 March 2025

Pathompol Charoenrattanapirom (Thai: ปฐมพล เจริญรัตนาภิรมย์, born 21 April 1994), often referred to either mononymously as Pathompol or by his nickname Mickey due to his long surname, is a Thai professional footballer who plays as a winger.

== Club career ==
=== BG Pathum United ===
On 14 December 2020, Pathompol signed for Thai League 1 club, BG Pathum United.

== International career ==
On 12 April 2021, He was named in manager Akira Nishino’s 47-man squad for Thailand’s 2022 World Cup qualification. In 2021 he was called up by Thailand national team for the 2020 AFF Championship.

=== International goals ===
#	Date	Venue	Opponent	Score	Result	Competition
1.	5 December 2021	National Stadium, Kallang, Singapore	Timor-Leste	1–0	2–0	2020 AFF Championship

== Honours ==
Chiangrai United

- Thai FA Cup: 2017
- Thailand Champions Cup: 2018

BG Pathum United

- Thai League 1: 2020–21
- Thailand Champions Cup: 2021, 2022

Buriram United

- Thai League 1: 2025–26

Thailand

- AFF Championship: 2020
- King's Cup runner-up: 2023
