= Elias Dolah =

Thai footballer

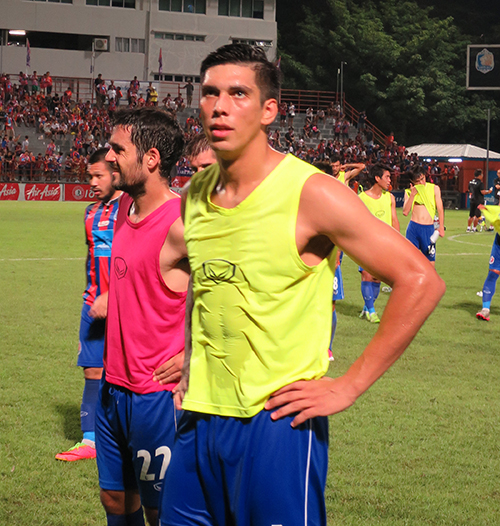
- Elias with Port in 2017

Personal information
- Full name: Elias Dolah
- Date of birth: 24 April 1993 (age 33)
- Place of birth: Lund, Sweden
- Height: 1.96 m (6 ft 5 in)
- Position: Centre-back

Team information
- Current team: BG Pathum United (on loan from Buriram United)
- Number: 17

Youth career
- 2006–2010: Dalby GIF
- 2011–2012: Lunds BK

Senior career*
Years	Team	Apps	(Gls)
2013–2014	Lunds BK	21	(0)
2014	FC Rosengård	0	(0)
2015–2016	Songkhla United	26	(1)
2017–2023	Port	134	(5)
2023–2025	Bali United	63	(3)
2025–	Buriram United	0	(0)
2026–	→ BG Pathum United (loan)	11	(2)

International career^{‡}
2019–	Thailand	24	(1)
Medal record
Thailand
Asean Football Championship
Winner	2020 Singapore	Team
- * Club domestic league appearances and goals as of 01:52, 30 June 2026 (UTC) ‡ National team caps and goals as of 4 June 2025

Elias Dolah (Thai: เอเลียส ดอเลาะ, born 24 April 1993) is a professional footballer who plays primarily as a centre-back play for Thai League 1 club BG Pathum United (on loan from Buriram United. Born in Sweden, he represents the Thailand national team.

== Early life ==
Dolah was born in Sweden to a Swedish mother and Thai father from Narathiwat, where he follows his father's religion as a Muslim. Dolah's grandparents are from the state of Kelantan, Malaysia. He was eligible to play for Thailand, Sweden, or Malaysia, before electing for Thailand.

== International career ==
On 2019, Dolah was named in Akira Nishino's squad for Thailand's 2022 World Cup qualification.

On 2021, he was called up by Alexandré Pölking to play for Thailand at the 2020 AFF Championship.

== Career statistics ==
=== International ===
As of 4 June 2025

National team	Year	Apps	Goals
Thailand	2019	2	0
Thailand	2021	4	1
Thailand	2023	6	0
Thailand	2024	9	0
Thailand	2025	3	0
Total		24	1

=== International Goals ===
Scores and results list Thailand's goal tally first.

No.	Date	Venue	Opponent	Score	Result	Competition
1.	18 December 2021	National Stadium, Kallang, Singapore	Singapore	1–0	2–0	2020 AFF Championship

== Honours ==
Port

- Thai FA Cup: 2019

Thailand

- AFF Championship: 2020
- King's Cup: 2024
