= Ricky Kambuaya =

Indonesian association football player

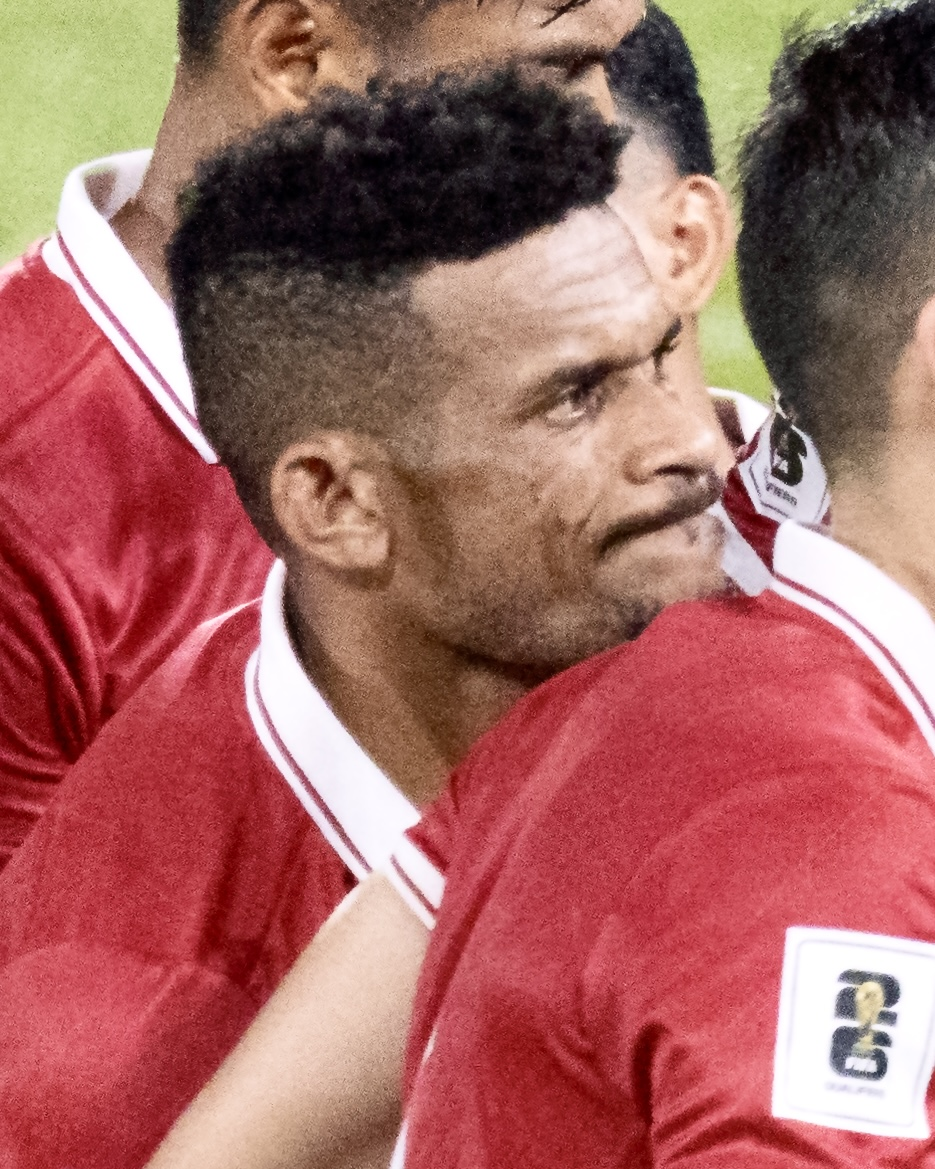
- Kambuaya playing for Indonesia in 2023

Personal information
- Full name: Ricky Richardo Kambuaya
- Date of birth: 5 May 1996 (age 30)
- Place of birth: Sorong, Indonesia
- Height: 1.74 m (5 ft 9 in)
- Position: Central midfielder

Team information
- Current team: Dewa United Banten
- Number: 19

Youth career
- 2015: Pro Duta

Senior career*
Years	Team	Apps	(Gls)
2017–2018	PS Mojokerto Putra	45	(16)
2018–2019	PSS Sleman	14	(0)
2020–2022	Persebaya Surabaya	18	(6)
2022–2023	Persib Bandung	22	(0)
2023–	Dewa United Banten	84	(10)

International career^{‡}
2022	Indonesia SEA Games (O.P.)	5	(0)
2021–	Indonesia	46	(5)
Medal record
Men's football
Representing Indonesia
Southeast Asian Games
Bronze medal – third place	2021 Vietnam	Team
AFF Championship
Runner-up	2020 Singapore	Team
- * Club domestic league appearances and goals as of 31 October 2026 ‡ National team caps and goals as of 11 October 2025

Ricky Richardo Kambuaya (born 5 May 1996) is an Indonesian professional footballer who plays as a central midfielder for Super League club Dewa United Banten and the Indonesia national team.

== Club career ==
=== PS Mojokerto Putra ===
In 2017, Kambuaya signed a year contract with PS Mojokerto Putra. Kambuaya scored ten goals in the 2017 season, when PSMP played in the second division.

=== PSS Sleman ===
On 28 January 2019, Kambuaya signed a year contract with PSS Sleman along other players, Derry Rachman, Haris Tuharea, and Jajang Sukmara. Kambuaya made his league debut in a 3–1 win against Arema on 15 May as a substitute for Brian Ferreira in the 85th minute.

=== Persebaya Surabaya ===
On 2 January 2020, Kambuaya signed a year contract with Persebaya Surabaya. On 11 January 2020, Kambuaya start unofficial debut for Persebaya Surabaya on friendly match vs Persis Solo. And one month later, Kambuaya made his first league debut in a 1–1 draw against Persik Kediri on 29 February as a substitute for Hambali Tolib in the 48th minute. And a month later, This season was suspended on 27 March 2020 due to the COVID-19 pandemic. The season was abandoned and was declared void on 20 January 2021. On 4 September 2021, Kambuaya scored his first goal for Persebaya in a 3–1 loss over Borneo at the Wibawa Mukti Stadium.

=== Persib Bandung ===
Kambuaya was signed for Persib Bandung to play in Liga 1 in the 2022–23 season. He made his league debut on 7 August 2022 in a match against Borneo at the Segiri Stadium, Samarinda.

== International career ==
In September 2021, Kambuaya was called up to the Indonesia national team for first time in 2 match against Chinese Taipei in the 2023 AFC Asian Cup qualification – play-off round by Shin Tae-yong. He made his official international debut on 7 October 2021, against Chinese Taipei in a 2023 AFC Asian Cup qualification Play-off Round match. 4 days later, he made first international goal against Chinese Taipei in a 2023 AFC Asian Cup qualification Play-off Round leg 2, in which Indonesia won 3–0. In his next appearance on 25 November 2021, Kambuaya scored opening goal in a win 4–1 over Myanmar. In December 2021, Kambuaya was named in Indonesia's squad for the 2020 AFF Championship. In the second leg final against Thailand on 1 January 2022, he scored Indonesia's opening goal in the first half, although the match ended in a 2–2 draw with Changsuek team, 6–2 aggregate score and Thailand became champions, However, what was interesting in the match was the figure of Kambuaya, he managed to become the Man of the match.

== Career statistics ==
=== Club ===
As of match played 31 October 2026

Club	Season	League			Cup (Note: Includes Piala Indonesia)		Continental		Other		Total	
Club	Season	Division	Apps	Goals	Apps	Goals	Apps	Goals	Apps	Goals	Apps	Goals
PS Mojokerto Putra	2017	Liga 2	19	8	0	0	–		0	0	19	8
PS Mojokerto Putra	2018	Liga 2	26	8	0	0	–		0	0	26	8
PS Mojokerto Putra	Total		45	16	0	0	–		0	0	45	16
PSS Sleman	2019	Liga 1	14	0	1	0	–		3 (Note: Appearances in Indonesia President's Cup)	0	18	0
Persebaya Surabaya	2020	Liga 1	2	0	0	0	–		0	0	2	0
Persebaya Surabaya	2021–22	Liga 1	18	6	0	0	–		5 (Note: Appearances in Menpora Cup)	0	23	6
Persebaya Surabaya	Total		20	6	0	0	–		5	0	25	6
Persib Bandung	2022–23	Liga 1	22	0	0	0	0	0	1	0	23	0
Dewa United Banten	2023–24	Liga 1	29	4	0	0	–		0	0	29	4
Dewa United Banten	2024–25	Liga 1	26	2	0	0	–		0	0	26	2
Dewa United Banten	2025–26	Super League	28	4	0	0	5 (Note: Appearances in AFC Challenge League)	0	0	0	33	4
Dewa United Banten	2026–27	Super League	1	0	0	0	0	0	0	0	1	0
Career total			185	32	1	0	5	0	9	0	201	32

=== International ===
As of match played 11 October 2025

Appearances and goals by national team and year
National team	Year	Apps	Goals
Indonesia	2021	11	2
Indonesia	2022	10	3
Indonesia	2023	11	0
Indonesia	2024	8	0
Indonesia	2025	6	0
Total		46	5

As of match played 10 September 2024
Scores and results list Indonesia's goal tally first, score column indicates score after each Kambuaya goal.

List of international goals scored by Ricky Kambuaya
No.	Date	Venue	Cap	Opponent	Score	Result	Competition
1	11 October 2021	Buriram Stadium, Buriram, Thailand	2	Chinese Taipei	2–0	3–0	2023 AFC Asian Cup qualification
2	25 November 2021	Emirhan Sports Complex, Antalya, Turkey	4	Myanmar	1–0	4–1	Friendly
3	1 January 2022	National Stadium, Kallang, Singapore	12	Thailand	1–0	2–2	2020 AFF Championship final
4	27 January 2022	Kapten I Wayan Dipta Stadium, Gianyar, Indonesia	13	Timor-Leste	1–1	4–1	Friendly
5	30 January 2022	Kapten I Wayan Dipta Stadium, Gianyar, Indonesia	14	Timor-Leste	3–0	3–0	Friendly

== Honours ==
Persebaya Surabaya

- East Java Governor Cup: 2020

Indonesia

- AFF Championship runner-up: 2020

Indonesia SEA Games

- SEA Games bronze medal: 2021

Individual

- 2020 AFF Championship: Team of the Tournament
- APPI Indonesian Football Award Best XI: 2025–26
