= Nyein Chan =

Burmese footballer

Personal information
- Full name: Nyein Chan
- Date of birth: 2 June 1994 (age 32)
- Place of birth: Wundwin, Mandalay, Myanmar
- Height: 1.82 m (5 ft 11 1/2 in)
- Position: Centre back

Team information
- Current team: Rakhine United F.C.
- Number: 3

Senior career*
Years	Team	Apps	(Gls)
2015	Nay Pyi Taw	21	(0)
2016–2019	Rakhine United	88	(1)
2019–2021	Shan United	47	(0)
2022	Ranong United	19	(0)
2023–2025	Dagon Star		

International career
2019–	Myanmar	17	(0)
- * Club domestic league appearances and goals

Nyein Chan (born 2 June 1991) is a Burmese professional footballer who plays as a centre back.

== International career ==
In 2019, Chan was called up by Myanmar for the 2022 World Cup Qualification Stage and made his debut against Nepal, followed by appearances against Tajikistan and Mongolia.

As of match played 31 December 2022

Appearances and goals by year
National team	Year	Apps	Goals
Myanmar	2019	5	0
Myanmar	2021	7	0
Myanmar	2022	5	0
Total		17	0
