= Thanawat Suengchitthawon =

Thai footballer (born 2000)

Personal information
- Full name: Thanawat Suengchitthawon
- Date of birth: 8 January 2000 (age 26)
- Place of birth: Suphan Buri, Thailand
- Height: 1.70 m (5 ft 7 in)
- Position: Midfielder

Team information
- Current team: Ratchaburi
- Number: 8

Youth career
- 2006–2013: AS Neunkirch
- 2013–2017: Nancy

Senior career*
Years	Team	Apps	(Gls)
2017–2020	Nancy II	32	(2)
2020–2023	Leicester City	0	(0)
2023–2024	Muangthong United	14	(1)
2024–	Ratchaburi	44	(7)

International career^{‡}
2016	France U16	5	(1)
2016–2017	France U17	4	(0)
2021–2022	Thailand U23	5	(1)
2021–	Thailand	12	(1)
Medal record
Thailand
Asean Football Championship
Winner	Suzuki Cup 2020	Team
- * Club domestic league appearances and goals as of 05:55, 30 April 2026 (UTC) ‡ National team caps and goals as of 18 November 2025

Thanawat Suengchitthawon (Thai: ธนวัฒน์ ซึ้งจิตถาวร, born 8 January 2000) is a Thai professional footballer who plays as a midfielder for Thai League 1 side Ratchaburi and the Thailand national football team.

Having played for Nancy's youth system and the France national youth team, Thanawat made his international debut with Thailand in 2021 and transferred to Leicester City in 2020. He played for their U23 sides and also managed to appear on the roster for the senior team.

== Personal life ==
Thanawat was born in Suphan Buri but moved to France with his mother when he was young and subsequently obtained French citizenship in addition to his Thai one.

== Club career ==
Thanawat spent seven years with local team Neunkirch before signing for Nancy, at the age of 13.

On 19 September 2020, Thanawat joined Leicester City on a free transfer, playing for the side's Development Squad. He made his first appearance in the Premier League 2 match against Blackburn Rovers on 29 September 2020. He was named on the bench for the senior squad against Manchester City on 3 April 2021.

After leaving Leicester City at the end of the 2022–23 season, Thanawat joined the Thai League 1 club Muangthong United in July 2023. His contract with Muangthong United was terminated in July 2024, after which he joined another Thai League 1 club Ratchaburi F.C. at the start of the 2024–25 season.

== International career ==
Thanawat has represented France at under-16 and under-17 levels, thus eligible to represent France, in addition to his Thai origin.

On 12 April 2021, Thanawat was named in manager Akira Nishino’s 47-man squad for Thailand’s 2022 World Cup qualification against Indonesia, UAE and Malaysia, as well as the friendly matches against Tajikistan. He made his debut on 29 May against Tajikistan in a friendly match. He was also called up by Thailand for the 2020 AFF Championship.

Thanawat scored his first international goal on 18 November 2025 against Sri Lanka during the 2027 AFC Asian Cup qualification at the Colombo Racecourse.

== Career statistics ==
=== Club ===
As of match played 27 April 2024

Appearances and goals by club, season and competition
Club	Season	League			FA Cup		League Cup		Other		Total	
Club	Season	Division	Apps	Goals	Apps	Goals	Apps	Goals	Apps	Goals	Apps	Goals
Leicester City U21	2020–21	—			—		—		4 (Note: Appearances in EFL Trophy)	2	4	2
Leicester City U21	2021–22	—			—		—		3 (Note: Appearances in EFL Trophy)	0	3	0
Leicester City U21	2022–23	—			—		—		0	0	0	0
Leicester City	2020–21	Premier League	0	0	0	0	0	0	—		0	0
Total			0	0	0	0	0	0	7	2	7	2
Muangthong United	2023–24	Thai League 1	10	1	0	0	2	1	—		12	2
Total			10	1	0	0	2	1	0	0	12	2
Career total			10	1	0	0	2	1	7	2	19	4

=== International ===
As of match played 18 November 2025

Appearances and goals by national team and year
National team	Year	Apps	Goals
Thailand	2021	8	0
Thailand	2022	1	0
Thailand	2025	3	1
Total		12	1

=== International goals ===
#	Date	Venue	Opponent	Score	Result	Competition
1.	18 November 2025	Colombo Racecourse, Colombo, Sri Lanka	Sri Lanka	1–0	4–0	2027 AFC Asian Cup qualification

== Honours ==
Thailand

- AFF Championship (1): 2020

Individual

- Thai League 1 Team of the Season: 2025–26
