= Kim Hee-gon =

South Korean football referee

- Full name: Kim Hee-gon
- Born: 4 November 1985 (age 40); South Korea

International
Years	League	Role
2013–	FIFA	Referee

Kim Hee-gon (Korean: 김희곤; born on 4 November 1985) is a South Korean football referee who has been a FIFA listed international referee since 2013.

He was active in the AFC Champions League, AFC Cup, and AFF Suzuki Cup, and was also a soccer instructor.

In the first leg of the playoff game between Daejeon FC and Gwangju FC, on 28 November 2018, Lee Seung-mo fell from his head and lost consciousness in an aerial ball competition with Yoon Kyung-bo in the first half. It is said that he regained consciousness in two minutes thanks to the quick response of the doctor and quick emergency rescue.
