= Alexandré Pölking =

Brazilian footballer and manager (born 1976)

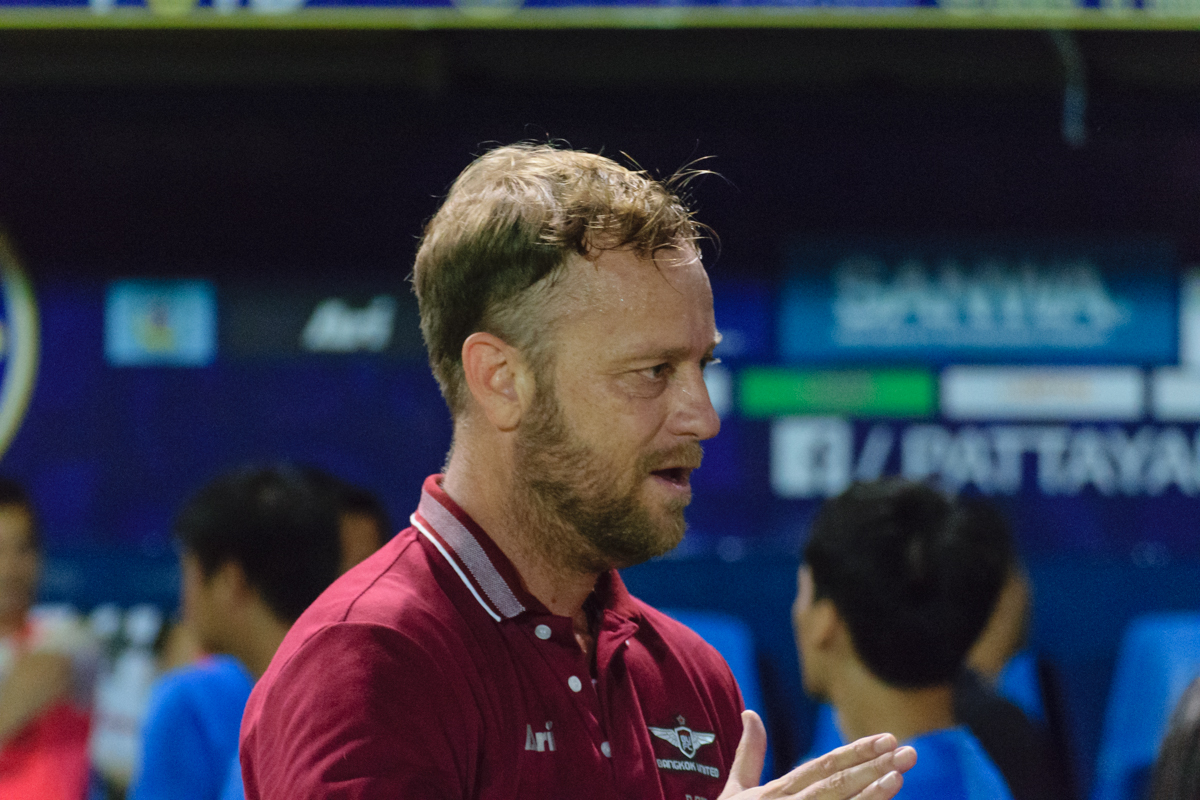
- Pölking with Bangkok United in 2018

Personal information
- Full name: Alexandré Pölking
- Date of birth: 12 March 1976 (age 50)
- Place of birth: Montenegro, Rio Grande do Sul, Brazil
- Height: 1.86 m (6 ft 1 in)
- Position: Winger

Team information
- Current team: Công An Hà Nội (manager)

Senior career*
Years	Team	Apps	(Gls)
2001–2003	VfB Fichte Bielefeld	59	(15)
2003–2004	Arminia Bielefeld	37	(13)
2004–2005	SV Darmstadt 98	28	(5)
2005–2006	Olympiakos Nicosia	22	(4)
2006	APOEL	6	(0)
2007	Olympiakos Nicosia	10	(0)
Total		162	(37)

Managerial career
- 2007 – 2009: Al Ain (assistant)
- 2010 – 2011: FK Baku (assistant)
- 2011: Golden Arrows (assistant)
- 2011 – 2013: Thailand (assistant)
- 2012: Thailand U23
- 2012 – 2013: Army United
- 2014: Suphanburi
- 2014 – 2020: Bangkok United
- 2020 – 2021: Ho Chi Minh City
- 2021 – 2023: Thailand
- 2022: Thailand U23 (interim)
- 2024 –: Công An Hà Nội
Medal record
Men's football
Representing Thailand (as manager)
AFF Championship
Winner	2020
Winner	2022
- * Club domestic league appearances and goals

Alexandré "Mano" Pölking (born 12 March 1976) is a Brazilian football manager and former football player. He is currently the manager of the V.League 1 club, Công An Hà Nội.

== Playing career ==
He started his career in his ancestral country of Germany, playing for VfB Fichte Bielefeld, Arminia Bielefeld and SV Darmstadt 98. In 2005, he moved to Cyprus where he played for Olympiakos Nicosia and APOEL.

== Managerial career ==
Pölking was the assistant of German manager Winfried Schäfer since 2008, at Al Ain FC and FC Baku. In 2012, Alexandré Pölking came to Thailand to be the assistant of Schäfer who was appointed as the national head coach of Thailand national team in June 2011. In 2013, Pölking was appointed by the Army United as the head coach. He finished his first season as the manager with sixth place at the final standing.

In 2014, Pölking moved to Suphanburi. However, after only 12 matches managing the club in the Thai Premier League he was sacked. Following his departure from Suphanburi, Pölking later took over as manager of Bangkok United during the second leg of the 2014 season. He made his debut with Bangkok United in a 3–0 win over his former club Army United on 25 June 2014.

=== Thailand ===
Pölking was appointed as the head coach of the Thailand national team, as announced by the Football Association of Thailand on 28 September 2021. Pölking replaced Japanese coach Akira Nishino, who was sacked in July after the War Elephants were eliminated in the qualifying round for the 2022 FIFA World Cup.

Polking's first task was the 2020 AFF Championship in December 2021. Between 5 December 2021 and 1 January 2022, Polking accomplished the very task as he led the War Elephants to win 6–2 on aggregate after being held to 2–2 second-leg draw by Indonesia's Garuda, making Thailand reign the AFF Championship for the sixth time. In 2022, Pölking managed the Thai side to defend the title in the 2022 AFF Championship as he led the team to win 3-2 on aggregate against Vietnam, Pölking became the fourth manager, after Peter Withe, Radojko Avramović and Kiatisuk Senamuang, to successfully defend the AFF Championship title, the first being on the 2020 edition. In the 2021 Southeast Asian Games, he became manager of U-23 team and he led the team to the men's football final, but lost 0–1 against the host Vietnam.

=== Công An Hà Nội ===
On 23 May 2024, Pölking was appointed as the head coach of V.League 1 side Công An Hà Nội, signing a two-year contract with the club., which is subsequently extended until 2028.

== Managerial statistics ==
As of match played 19 November 2026

Managerial record by team and tenure
Team	Nat.	From	To	Record					Ref.
Team	Nat.	From	To	G	W	D	L	Win %	Ref.
Thailand U23	(Thailand)	23 June 2012	3 July 2012	5	2	1	2	40.00	
Army United	(Thailand)	31 October 2012	30 November 2013	34	14	9	11	41.18	
Suphanburi	(Thailand)	2 January 2014	12 May 2014	14	6	3	5	42.86	
Bangkok United	(Thailand)	25 June 2014	18 October 2020	221	126	43	52	57.01	
Ho Chi Minh City	(Vietnam)	1 December 2020	28 September 2021	12	4	2	6	33.33	
Thailand	(Thailand)	28 September 2021	22 November 2023	37	21	8	8	56.76	
Thailand U23 (interim)	(Thailand)	11 April 2022	24 May 2022	6	4	0	2	66.67	
Công An Hà Nội	(Vietnam)	27 May 2024	Present	100	57	22	21	57.00	
Career Total				429	234	88	107	54.55	

== Honours ==
=== Manager ===
Thailand

- AFF Championship: 2020, 2022

Thailand U23

- SEA Games Silver medal: 2021

Cong An Hanoi

- V.League 1: 2025–26
- Vietnamese National Cup: 2024–25
- Vietnamese Super Cup: 2025, 2026
- ASEAN Club Championship runner-up: 2024–25

Individual

- Thai League 1 Coach of the Month: April 2016, April 2018, June 2019
- V.League 1 Manager of the Season: 2025–26
