= 2023–24 Port F.C. season =

Port
2023–24 season
- Chairman: (Thailand) Nualphan Lamsam (until 25 December 2023) (Thailand) Chalermchoke Lamsam (from 25 December 2023)
- Manager: (Thailand) Choketawee Promrut and (Thailand) Surapong Kongthep (until 8 November 2023) (Thailand) Rangsan Viwatchaichok (from 8 November 2023)
- Stadium: PAT Stadium, Khlong Toei, Bangkok, Thailand
- Thai League: 3rd
- Thai FA Cup: First Round
- Thai League Cup: Semi-finals
- AFC Champions League: Play-off round
- Top goalscorer: League: (Thailand) Teerasak Poeiphimai (15); All: (Brazil) Barros Tardeli (16)

Port F.C.'s 2023–24 season is the football club's seventh consecutive season in Thailand's premier division, after being promoted from Thai League 2 in 2017. Port finished third in the 2022–23 Thai League 1, qualifying for the play-off round of the 2023–24 AFC Champions League. In the 2023–24 season, Port participated in four competitions: the Thai League, FA Cup, League Cup, and AFC Champions League.

On 7 August 2023, the Thai League announced the program for the upcoming 2023–24 Thai League 1 season. The season commenced on 11 August 2023 and concluded on 16 June 2024.

On 8 November 2023, the club announced that Surapong Kongthep had parted ways with the club after joining the club midway through the 2022–23 season. Surapong's replacement was former Police Tero head coach Rangsan Viwatchaichok, with Tanya Vongnark taking up the club's manager position.

On 25 December 2023, Port announced that Nualphan Lamsam would resign as the club's chairman to become the president of the Football Association of Thailand. Chalermchoke Lamsam replaced her as the new club's chairman.

== Squad ==
As of 27 January 2024

Squad No.	Name	Nationality	Date of birth (age)	Previous club
Goalkeepers
1	Somporn Yos	(Thailand)	23 June 1993 (age 32)	(Thailand) Muangthong United
36	Worawut Srisupha (Vice-captain)	(Thailand)	25 May 1992 (age 33)	(Thailand) Bangkok F.C.
39	Sumethee Khokpho	(Thailand)	5 November 1998 (age 27)	(Thailand) Customs United F.C.
40	Samuel McAlpine	(Thailand)	10 February 1997 (age 28)	(Thailand) Prime Bangkok F.C.
Defenders
4	Suphanan Bureerat	(Thailand)	10 December 1993 (age 32)	(Thailand) Samut Prakan City F.C.
5	Frans Putros	(Iraq)	14 July 1993 (age 32)	(Denmark) Viborg FF
6	Asnawi Mangkualam	(Indonesia)	4 October 1999 (age 26)	(South Korea) Jeonnam Dragons
13	Chalermsak Aukkee	(Thailand)	25 August 1994 (age 31)	(Thailand) Police Tero F.C.
15	Jaturapat Sattham	(Thailand)	15 June 1999 (age 26)	(Thailand) Chainat Hornbill F.C.
23	Kevin Deeromram	(Thailand)	11 September 1997 (age 28)	(Thailand) Ratchaburi F.C.
24	Worawut Namvech	(Thailand)	4 July 1995 (age 30)	(Thailand) Nongbua Pitchaya F.C.
27	Thiti Thumporn	(Thailand)	27 April 1999 (age 26)	(Thailand) Nakhon Ratchasima F.C.
28	Charlie Clough	(England)	4 September 1990 (age 35)	(Thailand) Nakhon Ratchasima F.C.
Midfielders
7	Pakorn Prempak (Vice-captain)	(Thailand)	2 February 1993 (age 32)	(Thailand) Police United F.C.
8	Tanaboon Kesarat (captain)	(Thailand)	21 May 1993 (age 32)	(Thailand) BG Pathum United F.C.
9	Nattawut Sombatyotha	(Thailand)	1 May 1996 (age 29)	(Thailand) Ratchaburi F.C.
10	Bordin Phala	(Thailand)	20 December 1994 (age 31)	(Thailand) Buriram United F.C.
16	Chinnawat Wongchai	(Thailand)	8 December 1996 (age 29)	(Thailand) Buriram United F.C.
17	Chanukun Karin	(Thailand)	24 April 1997 (age 28)	(Thailand) Police Tero F.C.
18	Pathompol Charoenrattanapirom	(Thailand)	21 April 1994 (age 31)	(Thailand) BG Pathum United F.C.
33	Noboru Shimura	(Japan)	11 March 1993 (age 32)	(Serbia) FK Spartak Subotica
44	Worachit Kanitsribampen	(Thailand)	24 August 1997 (age 28)	(Thailand) BG Pathum United F.C.
47	Sittha Boonlha	(Thailand)	2 September 2004 (age 21)	(Thailand) Assumption United F.C.
88	Chayapipat Supunpasuch	(Thailand)	25 February 2001 (age 24)	(Portugal) S.C. Praiense
99	Tanasith Siripala	(Thailand)	9 August 1995 (age 30)	(Thailand) Suphanburi F.C.
Forwards
11	Janepob Phokhi	(Thailand)	4 April 1996 (age 29)	(Thailand) Police Tero F.C.
14	Teerasak Poeiphimai	(Thailand)	21 September 2002 (age 23)	(Thailand) Prime Bangkok F.C.
22	Felipe Amorim	(Brazil)	4 January 1991 (age 35)	(India) Hyderabad FC
25	Hamilton	(Brazil)	31 May 1991 (age 34)	(Thailand) Nongbua Pitchaya F.C.
37	Barros Tardeli	(Brazil)	2 March 1990 (age 35)	(Thailand) Nongbua Pitchaya F.C.
Players loaned out / left during season
3	Thitathorn Aksornsri	(Thailand)	8 November 1997 (age 28)	(Thailand) Police Tero F.C.
12	William Weidersjö	(Thailand)	10 June 2001 (age 24)	(Sweden) Hammarby TFF
20	Gustav Sahlin	(Thailand)	30 July 1999 (age 26)	(Sweden) Skövde AIK
31	Nurul Sriyankem	(Thailand)	8 February 1992 (age 33)	(Thailand) Chonburi F.C.
-	Nakin Wisetchat	(Thailand)	9 July 1999 (age 26)	(Thailand) BG Pathum United F.C.
77	Negueba	(Brazil)	7 April 1992 (age 33)	(Brazil) Criciúma

== Transfer ==
=== Pre-season transfer ===
==== In ====
Position	Player	Transferred From	Ref
MF	(Thailand) Worachit Kanitsribampen	(Thailand) BG Pathum United F.C.	Undisclosed (Note: Previously on loan, then permanently transfer to the club)
MF	(Thailand) Pathompol Charoenrattanapirom	(Thailand) BG Pathum United F.C.	Undisclosed (Note: Previously on loan, then permanently transfer to the club)
MF	(Japan) Noboru Shimura	(Serbia) FK Spartak Subotica	Free
DF	(England) Charlie Clough	(Thailand) Nakhon Ratchasima F.C.	Free
DF	(Thailand) Chalermsak Aukkee	(Thailand) Police Tero F.C.	Free
MF	(Thailand) Chanukun Karin	(Thailand) Police Tero F.C.	Free
MF	(Thailand) Chinnawat Wongchai	(Thailand) Buriram United F.C.	Free
DF	(Thailand) Nakin Wisetchat	(Thailand) BG Pathum United F.C.	Free
GK	(Thailand) Sumethee Khokpho	(Thailand) Customs United F.C.	Free
MF	(Thailand) Chayapipat Supunpasuch	(Portugal) S.C. Praiense	Free
GK	(Thailand) Samuel McAlpine	(Thailand) Prime Bangkok F.C.	Free
FW	(Brazil) Barros Tardeli	(Thailand) Nongbua Pitchaya F.C.	Free

==== Out ====
Position	Player	Transferred To	Ref
DF	(Brazil) Airton	(Thailand) PT Prachuap F.C.	Free
DF	(Thailand) Elias Dolah	(Indonesia) Bali United F.C.	Free
MF	(Thailand) Siwakorn Jakkuprasat	(Thailand) Ratchaburi F.C.	Free
DF	(Thailand) Adisorn Promrak	(Thailand) Ratchaburi F.C.	Free
GK	(Thailand) Rattanai Songsangchan	(Thailand) PT Prachuap F.C.	Free
DF	(Thailand) Yossawat Montha	(Thailand) Kasetsart F.C.	Free
FW	(Spain) Sergio Suárez	(Spain) UD Tamaraceite	Free
DF	(Spain) David Rochela		Retired
MF	(Thailand) Tawin Mahajindawong	Unattached	Released
DF	(Thailand) Philip Roller	Unattached	Contract termination
DF	(Thailand) Meechok Marhasaranukun	(Thailand) Lampang F.C.	Free
FW	(Thailand) Nanthawat Suankaeo	(Thailand) Nakhon Si United F.C.	Undisclosed
MF	(South Korea) Go Seul-ki	Unattached	Released
DF	(Philippines) Martin Steuble	Unattached	Released
DF	(Thailand) Panomporn Puangmalai	Unattached	Released
GK	(Thailand) Chatcharin Phutangdaen	Unattached	Released
FW	(Thailand) Phuchit Petcharat	Unattached	Released

==== Return from loan ====
Position	Player	Transferred From	Ref
MF	(South Korea) Go Seul-ki	(Thailand) Chonburi F.C.	Loan return
FW	(Thailand) Janepob Phokhi	(Thailand) Police Tero F.C.	Loan return
DF	(Thailand) Jaturapat Sattham	(Thailand) Nakhon Ratchasima F.C.	Loan return
DF	(Thailand) Adisorn Promrak	(Thailand) Nongbua Pitchaya F.C.	Loan return
MF	(Thailand) Tanasith Siripala	(Thailand) PT Prachuap F.C.	Loan return
MF	(Thailand) Nurul Sriyankem	(Thailand) Customs United F.C.	Loan return
FW	(Thailand) Phodchara Chainarong	(Thailand) Customs United F.C.	Loan return
DF	(Thailand) Anusak Jaiphet	(Thailand) Customs United F.C.	Loan return
FW	(Thailand) Nanthawat Suankaeo	(Thailand) Chiangmai United F.C.	Loan return
MF	(Thailand) Sittha Boonlha	(Thailand) Customs United F.C.	Loan return
DF	(Thailand) Panomporn Puangmalai	(Thailand) Customs United F.C.	Loan return
MF	(Thailand) Gustav Sahlin	(Thailand) Customs United F.C.	Loan return
DF	(Thailand) Meechok Marhasaranukun	(Thailand) Lampang F.C.	Loan return
DF	(Thailand) Yossawat Montha	(Thailand) Lampang F.C.	Loan return
GK	(Thailand) Chatcharin Phutangdaen	(Thailand) Muang Loei United F.C.	Loan return
FW	(Thailand) Phuchit Petcharat	(Thailand) AUU Inter Bangkok F.C.	Loan return

==== Loan out ====
Position	Player	Transferred To	Ref
MF	(Thailand) Charyl Chappuis	(Thailand) Chiangmai F.C.	Season loan
MF	(Thailand) Nattawut Sombatyotha	(Thailand) Trat F.C.	Season loan
FW	(Thailand) Janepob Phokhi	(Thailand) Police Tero F.C.	Season loan
DF	(Thailand) Thitawee Aksornsri	(Thailand) Trat F.C.	Season loan
FW	(Thailand) Phodchara Chainarong	(Thailand) Nakhon Pathom United F.C.	Season loan
DF	(Thailand) Anusak Jaiphet	(Thailand) Nakhon Pathom United F.C.	Season loan
FW	(Thailand) Marcel Sieghart	(Thailand) Ayutthaya United F.C.	Season loan
MF	(Thailand) Sansern Limwattana	(Thailand) Sukhothai F.C.	Season loan
MF	(Thailand) Sirawut Kengnok	(Thailand) Nakhon Ratchasima F.C.	Season loan
MF	(Thailand) Apidet Janngam	(Thailand) Muang Loei United F.C.	Season loan

=== Mid-season transfer ===
==== In ====
Position	Player	Transferred From	Ref
FW	(Brazil) Felipe Amorim	(India) Hyderabad FC	Free
DF	(Indonesia) Asnawi Mangkualam	(South Korea) Jeonnam Dragons	Free

==== Return from loan ====
Position	Player	Transferred To	Ref
MF	(Thailand) Nattawut Sombatyotha	(Thailand) Trat F.C.	Loan return
FW	(Thailand) Janepob Phokhi	(Thailand) Police Tero F.C.	Loan return
FW	(Thailand) Phodchara Chainarong	(Thailand) Nakhon Pathom United F.C.	Loan return

==== Loan out ====
Position	Player	Loaned To	Ref
DF	(Thailand) Thitathorn Aksornsri	(Thailand) Trat F.C.	Season loan
MF	(Brazil) Negueba	(Thailand) Lamphun Warriors F.C.	Season loan
MF	(Thailand) Nurul Sriyankem	(Thailand) Chonburi F.C.	Season loan
DF	(Thailand) Nakin Wisetchat	(Thailand) Chiangmai F.C.	Season loan
MF	(Thailand) William Weidersjö	(Thailand) Uthai Thani F.C.	Season loan
MF	(Thailand) Gustav Sahlin	(Thailand) Nakhon Si United F.C.	Season loan
FW	(Thailand) Phodchara Chainarong	(Thailand) Muang Loei United F.C.	Season loan

== Competitions ==
=== Overview ===
Competition	First match	Last match	Starting round	Final position	Record							
Competition	First match	Last match	Starting round	Final position	Pld	W	D	L	GF	GA	GD	Win %
Thai League	11 August 2023	26 May 2024	Matchday 1	3rd	30	16	9	5	72	37	+35	53.33
FA Cup	1 November 2023	1 November 2023	First Round	First Round	1	0	0	1	1	2	−1	0.00
League Cup	6 December 2023		First Round	Semi-finals	4	3	0	1	11	4	+7	75.00
Champions League	22 August 2023	22 August 2023	Play-off round	Play-off round	1	0	0	1	0	1	−1	0.00
Total					36	19	9	8	84	44	+40	52.78

Last updated: 26 May 2024
Source: Competitions

=== Thai League 1 ===
==== League table ====
Pos	Team	Pld	W	D	L	GF	GA	GD	Pts	Qualification
1	Buriram United (C, Q)	30	20	9	1	70	27	+43	69	Qualification for AFC Champions League Elite League stage
2	Bangkok United (Q)	30	17	10	3	58	24	+34	61	Qualification for AFC Champions League Elite Qualifying play-off
3	Port (Q)	30	16	9	5	72	37	+35	57	Qualification for AFC Champions League Two group stage
4	BG Pathum United	30	15	9	6	59	38	+21	54	
5	Muangthong United (Note: Qualified for the Champions League Two group stage due to Đông Á Thanh Hóa's withdrawal from the competition and BG Pathum United's decision not to participate.) (Q)	30	16	4	10	64	45	+19	52	Qualification for AFC Champions League Two group stage

Updated to match(es) played on 26 May 2024. Source: Thai League
Rules for classification: Season in progress: 1) Points; 2) Goal difference; 3) Goals scored; End of season: 1) Points; 2) Head-to-head points; 3) Head-to-head goal difference; 4) Goals scored.
(C) Champions; (Q) Qualified for the phase indicated

==== Results summary ====
Overall								Home						Away					
Pld	W	D	L	GF	GA	GD	Pts	W	D	L	GF	GA	GD	W	D	L	GF	GA	GD
30	16	9	5	72	37	+35	57	11	1	3	42	19	+23	5	8	2	30	18	+12

==== Matches ====
Win Draw Loss

11 August 2023 1	Nakhon Pathom United	2-2	Port	Nakhon Pathom
	Ito 38'; Berg 68'		Hamilton 21'; Tardeli 84'	Stadium: Nakhon Pathom Municipality Sport School Stadium; Attendance: 4,848; Referee: Chaireag Ngam-som

18 August 2023 2	Port	3-1	Police Tero	Bangkok
	Bordin 22'; Hamilton 47'; Tardeli 84'		Jeong 4'	Stadium: PAT Stadium; Attendance: 4,733; Referee: Warintron Sassadee

28 August 2023 3	Muangthong United	1-3	Port	Nonthaburi
	Popp 55' (pen.)		Tardeli 10'; Hamilton 66'; Teerasak 90'	Stadium: Thunderdome Stadium; Attendance: 5,143; Referee: Sivakorn Pu-udom

17 September 2023 4	Port	3-1	PT Prachuap	Bangkok
	Kevin 40'; Chanukun 88'; Teerasak 90+4'		Samuel 90+2'	Stadium: PAT Stadium; Attendance: 4,522; Referee: Torphong Somsing

22 September 2023 5	Trat	2-1	Port	Trat
	Cohen 13'; Thanaset 45+1'		Teerasak 60'; Somporn (red card) 81'	Stadium: Trat Province Stadium; Attendance: 2,839; Referee: Wiwat Jumpaoon

30 September 2023 6	Port	6-1	Khon Kaen United	Bangkok
	Hamilton 11' 34'; Tardeli 50' (pen.) 75' (pen.); Bordin 79'; Teerasak 90+3'		Brenner 14'	Stadium: PAT Stadium; Attendance: 3,758; Referee: Winat Phophat

6 October 2023 7	Uthai Thani	1-5	Port	Uthai Thani
	Mbah 19'		Hamilton 24' 57'; Shimura 30'; Bordin 50'; Teerasak 90'	Stadium: Uthai Thani Province Stadium; Attendance: 4,472; Referee: Songkran Bunmeekiart

22 October 2023 8	Port	3-2	Lamphun Warriors	Bangkok
	Kevin 32'; Hamilton 61' (pen.); Bordin 64'		Tauã 53'; Akarapong 75'	Stadium: PAT Stadium; Attendance: 4,265; Referee: Pawara Seejen

27 October 2023 9	Sukhothai	2-1	Port	Sukhothai
	Bonilla 4'; Kritsana 70'		Tardeli 41'	Stadium: Thalay Luang Stadium; Attendance: 2,373; Referee: Wiwat Jumpaoon

4 November 2023 10	Port	0-2	True Bangkok United	Bangkok
			Rungrath 6'; Willen 90+4'	Stadium: PAT Stadium; Attendance: 5,093; Referee: Songkran Bunmeekiart

26 November 2023 11	Singha Chiangrai United	1-1	Port	Chiang Rai
	Bill 24'		Putros 78'	Stadium: Singha Chiangrai Stadium; Attendance: 4,786; Referee: Warintron Sassadee

2 December 2023 12	Port	2-3	BG Pathum United	Bangkok
	Suphanan 27'; Pakorn 32'		Álvarez 76'; Teerasil 85' (pen.) 90+4'	Stadium: PAT Stadium; Attendance: 5,862; Referee: Mongkolchai Pechsri

10 December 2023 13	Chonburi	0-2	Port	Chonburi
			Kevin 23'; Bordin 45+1'	Stadium: Chonburi UTA Stadium; Attendance: 5,510; Referee: Songkran Bunmeekiart

17 December 2023 14	Port	4-1	Buriram United	Bangkok
	Bordin 22'; Shimura 47'; Hamilton 75' 83'		Supachai 10'	Stadium: PAT Stadium; Attendance: 6,250; Referee: Wiwat Jumpaoon

25 December 2023 15	Port	3-0	Ratchaburi	Bangkok
	Shimura 10'; Worachit 25'; Teerasak 90+5'			Stadium: PAT Stadium; Attendance: 4,361; Referee: Warintron Sassadee

11 February 2024 16	Police Tero	0-4	Port	Bangkok
	Rachata (red card) 53'		Tardeli 14'; Clough 32'; Teerasak 75', 85'	Stadium: Boonyachinda Stadium; Attendance: 2,461; Referee: Mongkolchai Pechsri

14 February 2024 17	Port	4-3	Muangthong United	Bangkok
	Teerasak 62', 73', 76'; Tardeli 90+4'		Popp 28', 45+5' (pen.); Omori 85'	Stadium: PAT Stadium; Attendance: 5,116; Referee: Warintron Sassadee

17 February 2024 18	PT Prachuap	1-1	Port	Prachuap Khiri Khan
	Jeong Woo-geun 18'		Airton 57' (o.g.)	Stadium: Sam Ao Stadium; Attendance: 2,986; Referee: Sivakorn Pu-udom

24 February 2024 19	Port	1-0	Trat	Bangkok
	Pathompol 19'			Stadium: PAT Stadium; Attendance: 4,188; Referee: Kotchapoom Meesridaecha

2 March 2024 20	Khonkaen United	0-0	Port	Khon Kaen
				Stadium: Khonkaen PAO. Stadium; Attendance: 5,611; Referee: Winat Phophat

9 March 2024 21	Port	3-3	Uthai Thani	Bangkok
	Kevin 23'; Teerasak 70'; Chalermsak 76'		Hamad 45+2' 61'; Santos 51'	Stadium: PAT Stadium; Attendance: 4,261; Referee: Sahapop Sriboonlue

30 March 2024 22	Lamphun Warriors	2-2	Port	Lamphun
	Akkarapong 59'; Dennis 90+5' (pen.)		Worachit 31'; Felipe 70'	Stadium: Lamphun Stadium; Attendance: 3,239; Referee: Anusorn Nookaew

2 April 2024 23	Port	1-0	Sukhothai	Bangkok
	Pathompol 40'			Stadium: PAT Stadium; Attendance: 2,804; Referee: Songkran Bunmeekiart

7 April 2024 24	True Bangkok United	2-2	Port	Pathum Thani
	Mahmoud 17'; Jradi 62'		Felipe 34' 36'	Stadium: Thammasat Stadium; Attendance: 3,876; Referee: Warintron Sassadee

19 April 2024 25	Port	1-2	Singha Chiangrai United	Bangkok
	Tardeli 50'		Stewart 63' 68'	Stadium: PAT Stadium; Attendance: 3,769; Referee: Chaireag Ngam-som

27 April 2024 26	BG Pathum United	1-3	Port	Pathum Thani
	Álvarez 15' (pen.)		Tardeli 28'; Felipe 34'; Teerasak 82'	Stadium: BG Stadium; Attendance: 11,450; Referee: Akom Charoensuk

5 May 2024 27	Port	2-0	Chonburi	Bangkok
	Tardeli 6'; Pathompol 31'			Stadium: PAT Stadium; Attendance: 4,942; Referee: Akom Charoensuk

12 May 2024 28	Buriram United	1-1	Port	Buriram
	Bissoli 64'		Worachit 21'	Stadium: Chang Arena; Attendance: 31,200; Referee: Sivakorn Pu-udom

19 May 2024 29	Ratchaburi	2-2	Port	Ratchaburi
	Tyronne 15' 90+7' (pen.)		Worachit 34'; Felipe 43' (pen.); Chalermsak (yellow card) 56' (yellow-red card) 90+6'	Stadium: Dragon Solar Park Stadium; Attendance: 2,879; Referee: Sarayut Jakngoen

26 May 2024 30	Port	6-0	Nakhon Pathom United	Bangkok
	Felipe 32' 35'; Teerasak 60' 78'; Tanasith 86'; Tardeli 90+4'			Stadium: PAT Stadium; Attendance: 3,716; Referee: Sarayut Jakngoen

=== Thai FA Cup ===
==== Matches ====
Win Draw Loss

1 November 2023 First Round	Buriram United (T1)	2-1	Port (T1)	Buriram
	Čaušić 45+2'; Doumbouya 68'		Bordin 57'	Stadium: Chang Arena; Attendance: 18,932; Referee: Phairot Bunkamnoed

=== Thai League Cup ===
==== Matches ====
Win Draw Loss

6 December 2023 First Round	Bangkok (T3)	1-6	Port (T1)	Bangkok
	Witchaya 10'		Tanasith 9'; Chanukun 43'; Kevin 47'; Tardeli 49'; Bordin 89'; Supakorn 90+2' (o.g.)	Stadium: Chalerm Phraklat Bang Mod Stadium; Attendance: 2,500; Referee: Thapakorn Thongkon

13 March 2024 Second Round	PT Prachuap (T1)	0-2	Port (T1)	Prachuap Khiri Khan
			Tardeli 39' 90+5'	Stadium: Sam Ao Stadium; Attendance: 1,760; Referee: Satchukorn Saenchu

24 April 2024 Quarter-finals	Singha Chiangrai United (T1)	1-2	Port (T1)	Chiang Rai
	Bianconi 13'		Bordin 18'; Shimura 69'	Stadium: Singha Chiangrai Stadium; Attendance: 3,691; Referee: Songkran Bunmeekiart

22 May 2024 Semi-finals	BG Pathum United (T1)	2-1	Port (T1)	Ratchaburi
	Fandi 41'; Álvarez 62'		Putros 76'	Stadium: Dragon Solar Park; Attendance: 4,112; Referee: Wiwat Jumpaoon

=== AFC Champions League ===
==== Play-off round matches ====
22 August 2023 Play-off	Zhejiang (China)	1-0	(Thailand) Port	Huzhou Olympic Sports Centre, Huzhou
19:30 UTC+8	Andrijašević 51'	Report		Attendance: 15,608; Referee: Akhrol Risqullaev (Uzbekistan)

== Team statistics ==
=== Appearances and goals ===
As of 26 May 2024

No.	Pos.	Player	League		FA Cup		League Cup		AFC Champions League		Total	
No.	Pos.	Player	Apps.	Goals	Apps.	Goals	Apps.	Goals	Apps.	Goals	Apps.	Goals
1	GK	(Thailand) Somporn Yos	25	0	1	0	3	0	1	0	30	0
4	DF	(Thailand) Suphanan Bureerat	28	1	1	0	4	0	1	0	34	1
5	DF	(Iraq) Frans Putros	25	1	1	0	4	1	1	0	31	2
6	DF	(Indonesia) Asnawi Mangkualam	12	0	0	0	0	0	0	0	12	0
7	MF	(Thailand) Pakorn Prempak	23	1	1	0	4	0	1	0	29	1
8	MF	(Thailand) Tanaboon Kesarat	26	0	1	0	4	0	1	0	32	0
9	MF	(Thailand) Nattawut Sombatyotha	4	0	0	0	0	0	0	0	4	0
10	MF	(Thailand) Bordin Phala	26	6	1	1	3	2	1	0	31	9
11	FW	(Thailand) Janepob Phokhi	1	0	0	0	0	0	0	0	1	0
13	DF	(Thailand) Chalermsak Aukkee	23	1	1	0	4	0	0	0	28	1
14	FW	(Thailand) Teerasak Poeiphimai	22	15	1	0	4	0	0	0	27	15
15	DF	(Thailand) Jaturapat Sattham	12	0	0	0	1	0	0	0	13	0
16	MF	(Thailand) Chinnawat Wongchai	9	0	0	0	1	0	0	0	10	0
17	MF	(Thailand) Chanukun Karin	21	1	0	0	1	1	0	0	22	2
18	MF	(Thailand) Pathompol Charoenrattanapirom	23	3	0	0	3	0	1	0	27	3
20	MF	(Thailand) Gustav Sahlin	2	0	0	0	0	0	0	0	2	0
22	FW	(Brazil) Felipe Amorim	11	7	0	0	3	0	0	0	14	7
23	DF	(Thailand) Kevin Deeromram	26	4	1	0	4	1	1	0	32	5
24	DF	(Thailand) Worawut Namvech	4	0	0	0	0	0	0	0	4	0
25	FW	(Brazil) Hamilton	14	10	1	0	0	0	1	0	16	10
27	DF	(Thailand) Thiti Thumporn	1	0	0	0	0	0	0	0	1	0
28	DF	(England) Charlie Clough	17	1	0	0	1	0	1	0	19	1
33	MF	(Japan) Noboru Shimura	20	3	1	0	3	1	1	0	25	4
36	GK	(Thailand) Worawut Srisupha	2	0	0	0	0	0	0	0	2	0
37	FW	(Brazil) Barros Tardeli	28	12	1	0	4	4	1	0	34	16
39	GK	(Thailand) Sumethee Khokpho	5	0	0	0	1	0	0	0	6	0
40	GK	(Thailand) Samuel McAlpine	0	0	0	0	0	0	0	0	0	0
44	MF	(Thailand) Worachit Kanitsribampen	29	4	1	0	4	0	1	0	35	4
47	MF	(Thailand) Sittha Boonlha	8	0	0	0	2	0	0	0	10	0
88	MF	(Thailand) Chayapipat Supunpasuch	1	0	0	0	0	0	0	0	1	0
99	MF	(Thailand) Tanasith Siripala	19	1	1	0	4	1	0	0	24	2
Players loaned out / left during season
12	MF	(Thailand) William Weidersjö	0	0	0	0	0	0	0	0	0	0
31	MF	(Thailand) Nurul Sriyankem	2	0	0	0	0	0	1	0	3	0
	DF	(Thailand) Nakin Wisetchat	0	0	0	0	0	0	0	0	0	0
3	DF	(Thailand) Thitathorn Aksornsri	0	0	0	0	0	0	0	0	0	0
77	MF	(Brazil) Negueba	4	0	0	0	0	0	1	0	5	0

== Overall summary ==
=== Season summary ===
Games played	36 (30 Thai League, 1 FA Cup, 4 League Cup, 1 AFC Champions League)
Games won	19 (16 Thai League, 0 FA Cup, 3 League Cup, 0 AFC Champions League)
Games drawn	9 (9 Thai League, 0 FA Cup, 0 League Cup, 0 AFC Champions League)
Games lost	8 (5 Thai League, 1 FA Cup, 1 League Cup, 1 AFC Champions League)
Goals scored	84 (72 Thai League, 1 FA Cup, 11 League Cup, 0 AFC Champions League)
Goals conceded	44 (37 Thai League, 2 FA Cup, 4 League Cup, 1 AFC Champions League)
Goal difference	+40
Clean sheets	9 (8 Thai League, 0 FA Cup, 1 League Cup, 0 AFC Champions League)
Best result	6-0 vs Nakhon Pathom United (26 May 24)
Worst result	0-2 vs True Bangkok United (4 November 23)
Most appearances	Worachit Kanitsribampen (35)
Top scorer	Barros Tardeli (16)
Points	57

=== Score overview ===
Opposition	Home score	Away score	Double
BG Pathum United	2-3	1-3	No
Buriram United	4-1	1-1	No
Chonburi	2-0	0-2	Yes
Khon Kaen United	6-1	0-0	No
Lamphun Warriors	3–2	2-2	No
Muangthong United	4-3	1-3	Yes
Nakhon Pathom United	6-0	2-2	No
Police Tero	3-1	0-4	Yes
PT Prachuap	3-1	1–1	No
Ratchaburi	3-0	2-2	No
Singha Chiangrai United	1-2	1–1	No
Sukhothai	1-0	2-1	No
Trat	1-0	2-1	No
True Bangkok United	0-2	2-2	No
Uthai Thani	3-3	1-5	No
