= 2024–25 Port F.C. season =

Port
2024-25 season
- Chairman: (Thailand) Chalermchoke Lamsam
- Manager: (Thailand) Rangsan Viwatchaichok
- Stadium: PAT Stadium, Khlong Toei, Bangkok, Thailand
Home colours	Away colours	Third colours

The 2024–25 Port F. C. season was the football club's eighth consecutive season in Thailand's top league in Thai Football, after being promoted from Thai League 2 in 2017. Since Bangkok United finished second in the 2023–24 Thai League 1 season and won the 2023–24 Thai FA Cup, Port qualified for the group stage round of the 2024–25 AFC Champions League Two after finishing third in the 2023–24 Thai League 1. During the 2024–25 season, Port participated in four competitions: the Thai League, FA Cup, League Cup, and AFC Champions League Two.

On 25 June 2024, Thai League announced the program for the upcoming 2024–25 Thai League 1 season. The season commenced on 9 August 2024 and concluded on 27 April 2025.

== Squad ==
As of 6 February 2025

Squad No.	Name	Nationality	Date of birth (age)	Previous club
Goalkeepers
1	Somporn Yos	(Thailand)	23 June 1993 (age 32)	(Thailand) Muangthong United
31	Sumethee Khokpho	(Thailand)	5 November 1998 (age 27)	(Thailand) Trat F.C.
36	Worawut Srisupha (Vice-captain)	(Thailand)	25 May 1992 (age 33)	(Thailand) Bangkok F.C.
Defenders
3	Asnawi Mangkualam	(Indonesia)	4 October 1999 (age 26)	(South Korea) Jeonnam Dragons
4	Suphanan Bureerat	(Thailand)	10 December 1993 (age 32)	(Thailand) Samut Prakan City F.C.
5	Frans Putros	(Iraq) (Denmark)	14 July 1993 (age 32)	(Denmark) Viborg FF
6	Chalermsak Aukkee	(Thailand)	25 August 1994 (age 31)	(Thailand) Police Tero F.C.
17	Irfan Fandi	(Singapore)	13 August 1997 (age 28)	(Thailand) BG Pathum United F.C.
23	Kevin Deeromram	(Thailand) (Sweden)	11 September 1997 (age 28)	(Thailand) Ratchaburi F.C.
27	Thiti Thumporn	(Thailand)	27 April 1999 (age 26)	(Thailand) Nakhon Ratchasima F.C.
35	Isaac Honny	(Ghana)	6 June 1993 (age 32)	(Thailand) Police Tero F.C.
Midfielders
7	Pakorn Prempak (Vice-captain)	(Thailand)	2 February 1993 (age 32)	(Thailand) Police United F.C.
8	Tanaboon Kesarat (captain)	(Thailand)	21 May 1993 (age 32)	(Thailand) BG Pathum United F.C.
10	Bordin Phala	(Thailand)	20 December 1994 (age 31)	(Thailand) Buriram United F.C.
16	Chinnawat Wongchai	(Thailand)	8 December 1996 (age 29)	(Thailand) Buriram United F.C.
18	Pathompol Charoenrattanapirom	(Thailand)	21 April 1994 (age 31)	(Thailand) BG Pathum United F.C.
30	Anon Amornlerdsak	(Thailand)	6 November 1997 (age 28)	(Thailand) True Bangkok United F.C.
33	Noboru Shimura	(Japan)	11 March 1993 (age 32)	(Serbia) FK Spartak Subotica
37	Chanukun Karin	(Thailand)	24 April 1997 (age 28)	(Thailand) Police Tero F.C.
38	Natthakit Phosri	(Thailand)	8 February 2008 (age 17)	Youth team
44	Worachit Kanitsribampen	(Thailand)	24 August 1997 (age 28)	(Thailand) BG Pathum United F.C.
47	Sittha Boonlha	(Thailand)	2 September 2004 (age 21)	(Thailand) Assumption United F.C.
62	Chaiyawat Buran	(Thailand)	26 October 1996 (age 29)	(Thailand) Lamphun Warriors F.C.
88	Chayapipat Supunpasuch	(Thailand)	25 February 2001 (age 24)	(Portugal) S.C. Praiense
89	Peeradon Chamratsamee	(Thailand)	15 September 1992 (age 33)	(Thailand) Buriram United F.C.
99	Tanasith Siripala	(Thailand)	9 August 1995 (age 30)	(Thailand) Suphanburi F.C.
Forwards
9	Barros Tardeli	(Brazil)	2 March 1990 (age 35)	(Thailand) PT Prachuap F.C.
11	Peniel Mlapa	(Togo) (Germany)	20 February 1991 (age 34)	(South Korea) Busan IPark
14	Teerasak Poeiphimai	(Thailand)	21 September 2002 (age 23)	(Thailand) Prime Bangkok F.C.
20	Phakhawat Sapso	(Thailand)	20 November 2005 (age 20)	(Thailand) Monthongwitaya School
22	Felipe Amorim	(Brazil)	4 January 1991 (age 35)	(India) Hyderabad FC
26	Lonsana Doumbouya	(Guinea)	26 September 1990 (age 35)	(Thailand) Buriram United F.C.
Players loaned out
24	Worawut Namvech	(Thailand)	4 July 1995 (age 30)	(Thailand) Nongbua Pitchaya F.C.
28	Charlie Clough	(England)	4 September 1990 (age 35)	(Thailand) Chonburi F.C.
-	Nakin Wisetchat	(Thailand)	9 July 1999 (age 26)	(Thailand) BG Pathum United F.C.
30	Chanin Sae-ear	(Thailand)	5 July 1992 (age 33)	(Thailand) Chonburi F.C.
Players left during season
9	Nattawut Sombatyotha	(Thailand)	1 May 1996 (age 29)	(Thailand) Ratchaburi F.C.
15	Jaturapat Sattham	(Thailand)	15 June 1999 (age 26)	(Thailand) Chainat Hornbill F.C.
29	Willen Mota	(Brazil)	10 January 1992 (age 34)	(Thailand) Bangkok United F.C.

== Transfer ==
=== Pre-season transfer ===
==== In ====
Position	Player	Transferred From	Fee	Ref
DF	(Ghana) Isaac Honny	(Thailand) Police Tero	Free	
DF	(Singapore) Irfan Fandi	(Thailand) BG Pathum United	Free	
DF	(Thailand) Chaiyawat Buran	(Thailand) Lamphun Warriors	Free	
FW	(Brazil) Willen	(Thailand) Bangkok United	Free	
FW	(Guinea) Lonsana Doumbouya	(Thailand) Buriram United	Free	
FW	(Thailand) Phakhawat Sapso	(Thailand) Monthongwitaya School	Free	
MF	(Thailand) Peeradon Chamratsamee	(Thailand) Buriram United	Undisclosed	
GK	(Thailand) Chanin Sae-ear	(Thailand) Chonburi	Free	

==== Out ====
Position	Player	Transferred To	Fee	Ref
FW	(Brazil) Barros Tardeli	(Thailand) PT Prachuap	Free	
MF	(Thailand) Nurul Sriyankem	Unattached (Note: Later joined Chiangmai United)	Contract terminated	
DF	(Thailand) Thitathorn Aksornsri	Unattached (Note: Later joined Uthai Thani)	End of contract	
MF	(Brazil) Negueba	(Thailand) Lamphun Warriors	Free	
DF	(Thailand) Anusak Jaiphet	Unattached (Note: Later joined Nakhon Pathom United)	End of contract	
GK	(Thailand) (United States) Samuel McAlpine	Unattached (Note: Later joined Pattaya United)	End of contract	
DF	(Thailand) Thitawee Aksornsri	Unattached (Note: Later joined Nakhon Pathom United)	End of contract	
FW	(Thailand) Janepob Phokhi	Unattached (Note: Later joined Police Tero)	Contract terminated	
MF	(Thailand) Sansern Limwattana	Unattached (Note: Later joined Navy)	Contract terminated	
FW	(Brazil) Hamilton	Unattached	Contract terminated	
MF	(Thailand) (Sweden) William Weidersjö	(Thailand) Uthai Thani	Undisclosed	
MF	(Thailand) (Switzerland) Charyl Chappuis	Unattached (Note: Later joined Bangkok)	End of contract	
FW	(Thailand) Nantawat Suankaew	(Thailand) Mahasarakham SBT	Undisclosed	
MF	(Thailand) (Sweden) Gustav Sahlin	Unattached	End of contract	
FW	(Thailand) (Germany) Marcel Sieghart	Unattached (Note: Later joined Samut Prakan)	End of contract	

==== Return from loan ====
Position	Player	Returned From	Fee	Ref
DF	(Thailand) Anusak Jaiphet	(Thailand) Nakhon Pathom United F.C.	Loan Return	
DF	(Thailand) Nakin Wisetchat	(Thailand) Chiangmai F.C.	Loan Return	
DF	(Thailand) Thitawee Aksornsri	(Thailand) Trat F.C.	Loan Return	
DF	(Thailand) Thitathorn Aksornsri	(Thailand) Trat F.C.	Loan Return	
MF	(Thailand) (Switzerland) Charyl Chappuis	(Thailand) Chiangmai F.C.	Loan Return	
MF	(Thailand) Nurul Sriyankem	(Thailand) Chonburi F.C.	Loan Return	
MF	(Thailand) (Sweden) William Weidersjö	(Thailand) Uthai Thani F.C.	Loan Return	
MF	(Thailand) (Sweden) Gustav Sahlin	(Thailand) Nakhon Si United F.C.	Loan Return	
MF	(Brazil) Negueba	(Thailand) Lamphun Warriors F.C.	Loan Return	
FW	(Thailand) (Germany) Marcel Sieghart	(Thailand) Ayutthaya United F.C.	Loan Return	
MF	(Thailand) Sansern Limwattana	(Thailand) Sukhothai F.C.	Loan Return	
MF	(Thailand) Sirawut Kengnok	(Thailand) Nakhon Ratchasima F.C.	Loan Return	
MF	(Thailand) Apidet Janngam	(Thailand) Muang Loei United F.C.	Loan Return	
FW	(Thailand) Phodchara Chainarong	(Thailand) Muang Loei United F.C.	Loan Return	

==== Loan out ====
Position	Player	Loaned To	Fee	Ref
GK	(Thailand) Sumethee Khokpho	(Thailand) Trat	Season loan	
DF	(England) Charlie Clough	(Thailand) Chonburi	Season loan	
DF	(Thailand) Worawut Namvech	(Thailand) Ratchaburi	Season loan	
DF	(Thailand) Nakin Wisetchat	(Thailand) Nakhon Pathom United	Season loan	
FW	(Thailand) Phodchara Chainarong	(Thailand) Ayutthaya United	Season loan	
MF	(Thailand) Sirawut Kengnok	(Thailand) Police Tero	Season loan	
MF	(Thailand) Apidet Janngam	(Thailand) Police Tero	Season loan	
GK	(Thailand) (Australia) James Owen Shanahan	(Thailand) Phrae United	Season loan	

=== Mid-season transfer ===
==== In ====
Position	Player	Transferred From	Fee	Ref
FW	(Brazil) Barros Tardeli	(Thailand) PT Prachuap	Undisclosed	
FW	(Togo) (Germany) Peniel Mlapa	(South Korea) Busan IPark	Free	

==== Loan in ====
Position	Player	Loaned From	Fee	Ref
MF	(Thailand) Anon Amornlerdsak	(Thailand) Bangkok United	Season loan	

==== Out ====
Position	Player	Transferred To	Fee	Ref
DF	(Thailand) Jaturapat Sattham	(Thailand) Muangthong United	Free	
MF	(Thailand) Nattawut Sombatyotha	(Thailand) Mahasarakham SBT	Free	
FW	(Brazil) Willen	(Brazil) Esporte Clube Água Santa (B4)	Free	

==== Return from loan ====
Position	Player	Returned From	Fee	Ref
GK	(Thailand) Sumethee Khokpho	(Thailand) Trat	End of loan (Early Termination)	
DF	(England) Charlie Clough	(Thailand) Chonburi	End of loan (Early Termination)	

==== Loan out ====
Position	Player	Loaned To	Fee	Ref
GK	(Thailand) Chanin Sae-ear	(Thailand) Pattaya United	Season loan	
DF	(England) Charlie Clough	(Thailand) Sisaket United	Season loan	

== Friendlies ==
=== Pre-season friendlies ===
Win Draw Loss

13 July 2024 1	Port (Thailand)	3-2	(Thailand) Ratchaburi	Bangkok
	Felipe; Chaiyawat; Suphanan		Tanaka; Kim	Stadium: Alpine Football Camp Training Bangkok

20 July 2024 2	Port (Thailand)	3-1	(Thailand) PT Prachuap	Bangkok
	Bordin; Doumbouya		Phon-Ek	Stadium: PAT Stadium

23 July 2024 3	Port (Thailand)	1-1	(Hong Kong) Kitchee SC	Racha Thewa
	Bordin 90'		Bae Jae-woo 20'	Stadium: Windmill Football Club

27 July 2024 4	PT Satun (Thailand)	1-2	(Thailand) Port	Satun
	Okana-Stazi 90+3'		Willen 1'; Felipe 76'	Stadium: PT Satun Stadium

2 August 2024 5	Nakhon Ratchasima (Thailand)	1-1	(Thailand) Port	Nakhon Ratchasima
	Houla		Teerasak 29'	Stadium: 80th Birthday Stadium

=== Mid-season friendly ===
4 September 2024 Friendly	Johor Darul Ta'zim (Malaysia)	3-1	(Thailand) Port FC	Johor
	Arribas 14'; Obregón 57' 90'		Willen 80'	Stadium: Sultan Ibrahim Stadium

== Competitions ==
=== Overview ===
Competition	First match	Last match	Starting round	Final position	Record							
Competition	First match	Last match	Starting round	Final position	Pld	W	D	L	GF	GA	GD	Win %
Thai League	10 August 2024		Matchday 1		20	9	6	5	16	6	+10	45.00
FA Cup	20 November 2024	20 November 2024	First Round	First Round	1	0	0	1	1	2	−1	0.00
League Cup	5 February 2025		First Round		1	1	0	0	4	0	+4	100.00
Champions League Two	19 September 2024		Group stage		6	3	1	2	9	11	−2	50.00
Total					28	13	7	8	30	19	+11	46.43

Last updated: 5 February 2025
Source: Competitions

=== Thai League 1 ===
==== League table ====
Pos	Team	Pld	W	D	L	GF	GA	GD	Pts	Qualification
3	BG Pathum United	30	15	8	7	47	34	+13	53	Qualification for AFC Champions League Two group stage
4	Ratchaburi	30	15	7	8	65	47	+18	52	Qualification for AFC Champions League Two group stage
5	Port	30	13	9	8	52	39	+13	48	
6	Muangthong United	30	13	6	11	46	39	+7	45	
7	PT Prachuap	30	12	8	10	49	39	+10	44	

Source: Thai League
Rules for classification: Season in progress: 1) Points; 2) Goal difference; 3) Goals scored; End of season: 1) Points; 2) Head-to-head points; 3) Head-to-head goal difference; 4) Goals scored.

==== Results summary ====
Overall								Home						Away					
Pld	W	D	L	GF	GA	GD	Pts	W	D	L	GF	GA	GD	W	D	L	GF	GA	GD
20	9	6	5	35	25	+10	33	5	3	2	21	12	+9	4	3	3	14	13	+1

==== Matches ====
Win Draw Loss

10 August 2024 1	Rayong	1–3	Port	Rayong
	Cuerva 39'; Arthit Boodjinda (yellow card) 62'		Diego 85' (o.g.); Teerasak 89' 90+3'	Stadium: Rayong Provincial Stadium; Attendance: 6,250; Referee: Peerasan Krataithong

19 August 2024 2	Port	5–1	Singha Chiangrai United	Bangkok
	Bordin 23'; Doumbouya 32' 46'; Shimura 56'; Peeradon 69'		Piyaphon 90'; Santipap Yaemsaen (yellow card) 55'; Win Naing Tun (yellow card) 60'; Rodriguinho (yellow card) 78'	Stadium: PAT Stadium; Attendance: 6,250; Referee: Ekkachai Phetcham

24 August 2024 3	Khonkaen United	1–2	Port	Khon Kaen
	Brenner 27' (pen.); Parndecha Ngernprasert (yellow card) 20'; Panupong Hansuri (yellow card) 48' Phattharaphon Junsuwan (yellow card) 75'; Thawin Butsombut (yellow card) 81'		Bordin Phala 14'; Teerasak Poeiphimai 90+5' (yellow card) 90+8'; Asnawi Mangkualam (yellow card) 88'; Irfan Fandi (red card) 90+2'	Stadium: Khonkaen PAO. Stadium; Attendance: 4,813; Referee: Sivakorn Pu-udom

27 August 2024 4	Port	4–1	Sukhothai	Bangkok
	Bordin 8'; Honny 16'; Teerasak 85' 90+2'		Matheus 88'; John Baggio (yellow card) 48'; Sarawut Kanlayanabandit (yellow card) 90+2'	Stadium: PAT Stadium; Attendance: 4,076; Referee: Niwat Insa-ard

1 September 2024 5	Ratchaburi	2–2	Port	Ratchaburi
	Tanaka 22' 47'; Kritsananon Srisuwan (yellow card) 54'; Mohamed Mara (yellow card) 90'; Kampol (red card) 90+5'		Willen 8'; Bordin 50'; Pathompol Charoenrattanapirom (yellow card) 36'; Peeradon Chamratsamee (yellow card) 53'	Stadium: Dragon Solar Park; Attendance: 4,729; Referee: Anusorn Nookaew

12 September 2024 (Note: Thai League rescheduled the match between Port F.C. and Buriram United F.C. from September 14th to September 12th due to both team participate in the AFC competitions.) 6 (Rescheduled)	Port	0–0	Buriram United	Bangkok
	Noboru Shimura (yellow card) 33'; Chaiyawat Buran (yellow card) 88'; Isaac Honny (yellow card) 90+4'; Teerasak Poeiphimai (yellow card) 90+5'		Supachai Chaided (yellow card) 51'; Chrigor (yellow card) 90+5'	Stadium: PAT Stadium; Attendance: 6,250; Referee: U-sen Yala

22 September 2024 7 (Rescheduled)	Port	1–2	BG Pathum United	Bangkok
	Willen 90+2'		Freddy Álvarez 14'; Chanathip Songkrasin 56'; Melvyn Lorenzen (yellow card) 59'; Christian Gomis (yellow card) 73'; Saranon Anuin (yellow card) 90+5'	Stadium: PAT Stadium; Attendance: 6,250; Referee: Woottipong Ketkam

28 September 2024 8 (Rescheduled)	PT Prachuap	0–0	Port	Prachuap Khiri Khan
	Sittha Boonlha (yellow card) 89'		Tauã Ferreira dos Santos (yellow card) 60'; Irfan Fandi (yellow card) 83'	Stadium: Sam Ao Stadium; Attendance: 3,471; Referee: Thapakorn Thongkon

6 October 2024 9 (Rescheduled)	Port	2–0	Nakhon Pathom United	Bangkok
	Suphanan Bureerat 48'; Felipe Amorim 88'; Issac Honny (yellow card) 28'		Veljko Filipović (yellow card) 25'; Nopphakao Prachobklang (yellow card) 75'	Stadium: PAT Stadium; Attendance: 4,104; Referee: Sarayut Jakngoen

19 October 2024 10 (Rescheduled)	Nakhon Ratchasima	2–3	Port	Nakhon Ratchasima
	Deyvison 7'; Phiraphat Khamphaeng 10'		Nick Ansell 4' (o.g.); Felipe Amorim 48'; Asnawi Mangkualam 79'	Stadium: 80th Birthday Stadium; Attendance: 8,132; Referee: Torpong Somsingha

27 October 2024 11 (Rescheduled)	Port	1–1	Muangthong United	Bangkok
	Felipe Amorim 1'		Felicio Brown Forbes 23' (yellow card) 45'	Stadium: PAT Stadium; Attendance: 6,250; Referee: Phairot Bunkamnoed

2 November 2024 12 (Rescheduled)	True Bangkok United	2–0	Port	Pathum Thani
	Bassel Jradi 11'; Muhsen Al-Ghassani 72' (pen.)		Frans Putros (yellow card) 61'; Worawut Srisupha (yellow card) 69'	Stadium: Thammasat Stadium; Attendance: 3,843; Referee: Anusorn Nookaew

8 January 2025 13 (Rescheduled)	Port	2–1	Lamphun Warriors	Bangkok
	Lonsana Doumbouya 45+3' (pen.); Peeradon Chamratsamee 56'; Witthaya Moonwong (yellow card) 10'; Felipe Amorim (yellow card) 28'; Irfan Fandi (yellow card) 89'		Mohammed Osman 72'; Witthaya Moonwong (yellow card) 32'; Teerawut Churok (yellow card) 34'; Nuttee Noiwilai (yellow card) 45'; Anan Yodsangwal (yellow card) 75'	Stadium: PAT Stadium; Attendance: 3,847; Referee: Kotchapoom Meesridaecha

23 November 2024 14 (Rescheduled)	Uthai Thani	1–1	Port	Uthai Thani
	Justin Baas 78'; William Weidersjö (yellow card) 84'; Chakkit Laptrakul (yellow card) 90+3'		Lonsana Doumbouya 8'; Irfan Fandi (yellow card) 31'; Frans Putros (yellow card) 58'; Issac Honny (yellow card) 90'	Stadium: Uthai Thani Provincial Stadium; Attendance: 4,144; Referee: Anusorn Nookaew

1 December 2024 15 (Rescheduled)	Port	2–1	Nongbua Pitchaya	Bangkok
	Lonsana Doumbouya 74'; Teerasak Poeiphimai 89'		Marcus Haber 72'; Adisak Hantes (yellow card) 3'; Prin Goonchorn (yellow card) 87'	Stadium: PAT Stadium; Attendance: 3,847; Referee: Chaikrit Inboonsong

12 January 2025 16	Chiangrai United	1–0	Port	Chiangrai
	Sittichok Kannoo 13'; Júlio César (yellow card) 90+3'		Irfan Fandi (yellow card) 45+5'	Stadium: Singha Chiangrai Stadium; Attendance: 3,750; Referee: Phairot Bunkamnoed

15 January 2025 17	Port	1–2	Khon Kaen United	Bangkok
	Lonsana Doumbouya 26'; Suphanan Bureerat (yellow card) 51'; Frans Putros (yellow card) 90+2'		Ryu Seung-woo 22' (yellow card) 45+3'; Lossémy Karaboué 49' (yellow card) 71'; Panupong Hansuri (yellow card) 32'; Chatchai Chiakklang (yellow card) 52'; Chirawat Wangthaphan (yellow card) 90+3'	Stadium: PAT Stadium; Attendance: 2,317; Referee: Komgrit Ponpasi

20 January 2025 18	Sukhothai	3–2	Port	Sukhothai
	Lursan Thiamrat 6'; Matheus Fornazari 58'; John Baggio 90+4' (yellow card) 90+4'; Apichart Denman (yellow card) 26'		Noboru Shimura 44', 84'; Chalermsak Aukkee (yellow card) 22'; Bordin Phala (yellow card) 45+4'; Suphanan Bureerat (yellow card) 70'	Stadium: Thalay Luang Stadium; Attendance: 2,321; Referee: Panumas Phansamo

24 January 2025 19	Port	3–3	Ratchaburi	Bangkok
	Lonsana Doumbouya 45+2'; Chalermsak Aukkee 67'; Peniel Mlapa 85' (pen.); Peeradon Chamratsamee (yellow card) 45+6'		Gabriel Mutombo Kupa 37'; Tatsuya Tanaka 44', 48'; Jonathan Khemdee (yellow card) 29'; Jakkaphan Kaewprom (yellow card) 72'; Thanawat Suengchitthawon (yellow card) 72'	Stadium: PAT Stadium; Attendance: 3,538; Referee: Sivakorn Pu-udom

2 February 2025 20	Buriram United	0–1	Port	Buriram
			Chinnawat Wongchai 25'; Chanukun Karin (yellow card) 38'; Barros Tardeli (yellow card) 68'; Chaiwat Buran (yellow card) 71'; Somporn Yos (yellow card) 90+5'	Stadium: Chang Arena; Attendance: 31,305; Referee: Torphong Somsing

9 February 2025 21 (Rescheduled)	BG Pathum United	1–0	Port	Pathum Thani
	Surachat Sareepim 37' (yellow card) 25'; Patrik Gustavsson (yellow card) 47'; Marco Ballini (yellow card) 85'		Chalermsak Aukkee (yellow card) 74'; Noboru Shimura (yellow card) 75'	Stadium: BG Stadium; Attendance: 10,425; Referee: Noppadet Mangngam

10 April 2025 22 (Rescheduled)	Port	0–2	PT Prachuap	Bangkok
	Noboru Shimura (yellow card) 52'; Teerasak Poeiphimai (yellow card) 79'; Asnawi Mangkualam (yellow card) 90+3'		Chrigor 17' (yellow card) 36'; Taua 74'; Airton Tirabassi (yellow card) 39'; Sivakorn Tiatrakul (yellow card) 80'; Kanarin Thawornsak (yellow card) 90+4'; Chatmongkol Thongkiri (yellow card) 90+5'; Rattanai Songsangchan (yellow card) 90+8'	Stadium: PAT Stadium; Attendance: 2,745; Referee: Chaireag Ngamsom

13 April 2025 23 (Rescheduled)	Nakhon Pathom United	2–2	Port	Nakhon Ratchasima
	Amir Hossein Nemati 12'; Fergus Tierney 90'; Jennarong Phupha (yellow card) 44'; Sunchai Chaolaokhwan (yellow card) 57'; Veljko Filipović (yellow card) 87'		Natthakit Phosri 28'; Isaac Honny 45'; Chayapipat Supunpasuch (yellow card) 39'; Asnawi Mangkualam (yellow card) 82'	Stadium: 80th Birthday Stadium; Attendance: 1,132; Referee: Sivakorn Pu-udom

1 March 2025 24	Port	4–2	Nakhon Ratchasima Mazda	Bangkok
	Teerasak Poeiphimai 55', 87'; Tanaboon Kesarat 67'; Peeradon Chamratsamee 90+4'; Asnawi Mangkualam (yellow card) 70'; Noboru Shimura (yellow card) 84'		Nattanan Biesamrit 16'; Dennis Murillo 21' (pen.) (yellow card) 90+2'; (yellow card) 84'	Stadium: PAT Stadium; Attendance: 3,645; Referee: Sarayut Jakngoen

9 March 2025 25	Muangthong United	1–2	Port	Nonthaburi
	Teeraphol Yoryoei 90+1' (pen.); Chatchai Saengdao (yellow card) 90+4'		Worachit Kanitsribampen 14'; Tanaboon Kesarat 72'; Lonsana Doumbouya (yellow card) 57'	Stadium: Thunderdome Stadium; Attendance: 6,718; Referee: Songkran Bunmeekiart

16 March 2025 26	Port	0–0	Bangkok United	Bangkok
	Frans Putros (yellow card) 12'; Teerasak Poeiphimai (yellow card) 84'		Mahmoud Eid (yellow card) 53'; Thitiphan Puangchan (yellow card) 66'	Stadium: PAT Stadium; Attendance: 5,906; Referee: Akom Charoensuk

30 March 2025 27	Lamphun Warriors	3–2	Port	Lamphun
	Anan Yodsangwal 4'; Mohammed Osman 59'; Maung Maung Lwin 85'		Worachit Kanitsribampen 23'; Suphanan Bureerat 81'; Irfan Fandi (yellow card) 39'; Sittha Boonlha (yellow card) 90+4'	Stadium: Lamphun Province Stadium; Attendance: 3,236; Referee: Wiwat Jumpaoon

5 April 2025 28	Port	1–1	Uthai Thani	Bangkok
	Noboru Shimura 90+10'; Chanukun Karin (yellow card) 50'		Ben Davis 35' (pen.); Wattana Playnum (yellow card) 70'; Tiago Alves (yellow card) 90+8'	Stadium: PAT Stadium; Attendance: 3,901; Referee: Komgrit Ponpasit

20 April 2025 29	Nongbua Pitchaya	1–2	Port	Nongbua
	Jorge Felipe (yellow card) 56'; Phakhawat Sapso (yellow card) 90+1'		Teerasak Poeiphimai 57' (yellow card) 63'; Bordin Phala 59'; Sittha Boonlha (yellow card) 33'; Chaiyawat Buran (yellow card) 66'; Worachit Kanitsribampen (yellow card) 82'; Anawin Jujeen (yellow card) 86'	Stadium: Pitchaya Stadium; Attendance: 3,324; Referee: Sivakorn Pu-udom

30 April 2025 30 (Rescheduled)	Port	4–1	Rayong	Bangkok
	Chanukun Karin 37'; Noboru Shimura 62' (yellow card) 69'; Teerasak Poeiphimai 77' (penalty missed) 14; Peeradol Chamrasamee 81'		Arthit Boodjinda 43'; Parkin Harape (yellow card) 47'; Stênio Júnior (yellow card) 67'	Stadium: PAT Stadium; Referee: Phairot Bunkamnoed

=== Thai FA Cup ===
Win Draw Loss

20 November 2024 Round of 64	Port	1–2	BG Pathum United	Bangkok
	Lonsana Doumbouya 60'; Isaac Honny (yellow card) 26'; Peeradon Chamratsamee (yellow card) 67'		Raniel 31'; Ilhan Fandi 78'; Teerasil Dangda (yellow card) 76'; Christian Gomis (yellow card) 89'	Stadium: PAT Stadium; Attendance: 4,389; Referee: Niwat Insa-ard

=== Thai League Cup ===
Win Draw Loss

5 February 2025 Round of 32 (Rescheduled)	(T2) Chonburi	0–4	Port	Chonburi
	Theerapat Kaewphung (yellow card) 28'		Peniel Mlapa 31' (pen.); Felipe Amorim 38', 67'; Anon Amornlerdsak 46'; Chanukun Karin (yellow card) 65'	Stadium: Chonburi Stadium; Attendance: 3,542; Referee: Winat Phophat

26 February 2025 Round of 16	Port	3–2	Khon Kaen United	Bangkok
	Worachit Kanitsribampen 6'; Lonsana Doumbouya 29', 48'; Frans Putros (yellow card) 59'		Phattharaphon Jansuwan 40', 56'; Ryu Seung-woo (yellow card) 87'; Nopphon Ponkam (yellow card) 90'; Jiradet Taichankong (yellow card) 90+3'	Stadium: PAT Stadium; Attendance: 2,494; Referee: Wiwat Jumpaoon

16 April 2025 Quarter Final	Lamphun Warriors	2–0	Port	Lamphun
	Negueba 17'; Júnior Batista 70'		Isaac Honny (yellow card) 25'; Frans Putros (yellow card) 51'	Stadium: Lamphun Province Stadium; Attendance: 2,675; Referee: Sivakorn Pu-udom

=== AFC Champions League Two ===
==== Group stage ====
Pos	Team	Pld	W	D	L	GF	GA	GD	Pts	Qualification	LCS	POR	ZHP	PSB
1	(Singapore) Lion City Sailors	6	3	1	2	15	11	+4	10	Advance to round of 16	—	5–2	2–0	2–3
2	(Thailand) Port	6	3	1	2	9	11	−2	10	Advance to round of 16	1–3	—	1–0	2–2
3	(China) Zhejiang	6	3	0	3	10	10	0	9		4–2	1–2	—	1–0
4	(Indonesia) Persib	6	1	2	3	9	11	−2	5		1–1	0–1	3–4	—

Source: AFC
Rules for classification: Tiebreakers

Win Draw Loss

19 September 2024 Matchday 1	Persib Bandung (Indonesia)	0–1	(Thailand) Port F.C.	West Java, Indonesia
		Report	Sittha Boonlha (yellow card) 34'; Asnawi Mangkualam (yellow card) 45+2'; Willen 89'	Stadium: Si Jalak Harupat Stadium, Bandung (Note: Persib Bandung played their home matches at Si Jalak Harupat Stadium, Bandung, instead of their regular home stadium Gelora Bandung Lautan Api Stadium, Bandung.); Attendance: 4,204; Referee: Ammar Ashkanani (Kuwait)

30 October 2024 Matchday 2 (Rescheduled)	Port F.C. (Thailand)	1–3	(Singapore) Lion City Sailors	Pathum Thani, Thailand
	Noboru Shimura 55'; Peeradon Chamratsamee (yellow card) 38'	Report	Shawal Anuar 14', 17'; Song Ui-young 65' (yellow card) 39'; Hariss Harun (yellow card) 61'; Christopher van Huizen (yellow card) 86'	Stadium: BG Stadium (Note: Port played their home matches at Pathum Thani Stadium, Pathum Thani, instead of their regular home stadium PAT Stadium, Bangkok.); Attendance: 1,478; Referee: Faisal Alblwi (Saudi Arabia)

24 October 2024 Matchday 3	Port F.C. (Thailand)	1–0	(China) Zhejiang Professional	Pathum Thani, Thailand
	Felipe Amorim 70'; Suphanan Bureerat (yellow card) 32'; Chalermsak Aukkee (yellow card) 82'	Report	Yue Xin (yellow card) 54'	Stadium: BG Stadium; Attendance: 1,971; Referee: Ahmad Ibrahim (Jordan)

7 November 2024 Matchday 4	Zhejiang Professional (China)	1–2	(Thailand) Port F.C.	Hangzhou, China
	Franko Andrijašević 7'	Report	Lonsana Doumbouya 54'; Felipe Amorim 90' (yellow card) 72'; Chalermsak Aukkee (yellow card) 34'; Worachit Kanitsribampen (yellow card) 87'	Stadium: Huanglong Sports Center; Attendance: 16,933; Referee: Akhrol Riskullayev (Uzbekistan)

28 November 2024 Matchday 5	Port F.C. (Thailand)	2–2	(Indonesia) Persib Bandung	Pathum Thani, Thailand
	Doumbouya 18', 31'; Frans Putros (yellow card) 13'; Asnawi Mangkualam (yellow card) 67'; Teerasak Poeiphimai (yellow card) 90+1'; Suphanan Bureerat (yellow card) 90+4'	Report	Ciro 17' (pen.); da Silva 90+5'	Stadium: BG Stadium; Attendance: 1,451; Referee: Ammar Mahfoodh (Bahrain)

5 December 2024 Matchday 6	Lion City Sailors (Singapore)	5–2	(Thailand) Port F.C.	Kallang, Singapore
	Song Ui-young 1', 36', 67'; Shawal Anuar 71'; Lennart Thy 90+8'; Hami Syahin (yellow card) 76'; Bill Mamadou (yellow card) 90+4'	Report	Felipe Amorim 50'; Frans Putros 52'	Stadium: Jalan Besar Stadium; Attendance: 2,357; Referee: Casey Reibelt (Australia)

==== Knockout stage ====
13 February 2025 R16 Leg 1	Port F.C. (Thailand)	0–4	(South Korea) Jeonbuk Hyundai Motors	Pathum Thani, Thailand
	Chaiyawat Buran (yellow card) 46'; Peeradol Chamrasamee (yellow card) 54'; Barros Tardeli (yellow card) 70'	Report	Park Jin-seop 19'; Andrea Compagno 24', 60'; Song Min-kyu 49'; Han Kook-young (yellow card) 44'; Kim Tae-hwan (yellow card) 45+4'	Stadium: BG Stadium; Attendance: 1,385; Referee: Abdulla Al-Marri (Qatar)

20 February 2025 R16 Leg 2	Jeonbuk Hyundai Motors (South Korea)	1–0 (5–0 agg.)	(Thailand) Port F.C.	Jeonju, South Korea
	Bak Jae-yong 4'	Report	Felipe Amorim (yellow card) 74'	Stadium: Jeonju World Cup Stadium; Referee: Ma Ning (China)

== Team statistics ==
=== Appearances and goals ===
As of 30 Apr 2025

No.	Pos.	Player	League		FA Cup		League Cup		AFC Champions League Two		Total	
No.	Pos.	Player	Apps.	Goals	Apps.	Goals	Apps.	Goals	Apps.	Goals	Apps.	Goals
1	GK	(Thailand) Somporn Yos	15	0	0	0	3	0	1	0	19	0
3	DF	(Indonesia) Asnawi Mangkualam	20+8	1	1	0	1+1	0	6	0	28+9	1
4	DF	(Thailand) Suphanan Bureerat	23+1	2	1	0	3	0	4+3	0	31+4	2
5	DF	(Iraq) Frans Putros	18+4	0	0+1	0	3	0	7	1	28+5	1
6	DF	(Thailand) Chalermsak Aukkee	10+6	1	1	0	1+1	0	2+4	0	14+11	1
7	MF	(Thailand) Pakorn Prempak	5+12	0	0	0	0+2	0	1+3	0	6+17	0
8	MF	(Thailand) Tanaboon Kesarat	5+4	2	0	0	1	0	4+2	0	10+6	2
9	FW	(Brazil) Barros Tardeli	4+5	0	0	0	0	0	0+1	0	4+6	0
10	MF	(Thailand) Bordin Phala	14	5	0+1	0	0+1	0	3	0	17+2	5
11	FW	(Togo) (Germany) Peniel Mlapa	4+5	1	0	0	1	1	1+1	0	6+6	2
14	FW	(Thailand) Teerasak Poeiphimai	7+13	10	0+1	0	1+1	0	4+3	0	12+18	10
16	MF	(Thailand) Chinnawat Wongchai	2+3	1	0	0	0	0	1	0	3+3	1
17	DF	(Singapore) Irfan Fandi	12+2	0	0	0	0+1	0	3	0	15+3	0
18	MF	(Thailand) Pathompol Charoenrattanapirom	12+2	0	0	0	0+1	0	0+1	0	12+4	0
20	FW	(Thailand) Phakhawat Sapso	0+2	0	0	0	0	0	0	0	0+2	0
22	FW	(Brazil) Felipe Amorim	6+6	3	1	0	3	2	6+1	3	16+7	8
23	DF	(Thailand) Kevin Deeromram	18+7	0	0+1	0	2	0	5	0	25+8	0
26	FW	(Guinea) Lonsana Doumbouya	19+5	7	1	1	1+1	2	7+1	3	28+7	13
27	DF	(Thailand) Thiti Thumporn	1	0	0	0	0	0	0	0	1	0
30	MF	(Thailand) Anon Amornlerdsak	4+3	0	0	0	2	1	1+1	0	7+4	1
31	GK	(Thailand) Sumethee Khokpho	2	0	0	0	0	0	1	0	3	0
33	MF	(Japan) Noboru Shimura	19+5	5	0	0	3	0	4+1	1	26+6	6
35	DF	(Ghana) Isaac Honny	16+5	2	1	0	1	0	6	0	24+5	2
36	GK	(Thailand) Worawut Srisupha	13	0	1	0	0	0	4	0	18	0
37	MF	(Thailand) Chanukun Karin	5+9	1	0	0	0+1	0	1+2	0	6+12	1
38	MF	(Thailand) Natthakit Phosri	1+2	1	0	0	0	0	0	0	1+2	1
44	MF	(Thailand) Worachit Kanitsribampen	21+7	2	1	0	2+1	0	6+1	0	30+9	2
47	MF	(Thailand) Sittha Boonlha	6+11	0	1	0	0+3	0	2+4	0	9+18	0
62	MF	(Thailand) Chaiyawat Buran	11+8	0	0	0	2+1	0	2+1	0	15+10	0
88	MF	(Thailand) Chayapipat Supunpasuch	1	0	0	0	0	0	0	0	1	0
89	MF	(Thailand) Peeradon Chamratsamee	23+3	4	1	0	3	0	5+3	0	32+6	4
99	MF	(Thailand) Tanasith Siripala	1+5	0	0	0	0	0	0	0	1+5	0
Players loaned out / left during season
9	MF	(Thailand) Nattawut Sombatyotha	0	0	0	0	0	0	0	0	0	0
15	DF	(Thailand) Jaturapat Sattham	0	0	1	0	0	0	0+1	0	1+1	0
29	FW	(Brazil) Willen Mota	12	2	0+1	0	0	0	0+4	1	12+5	3
30	GK	(Thailand) Chanin Sae-ear	0	0	0	0	0	0	1	0	1	0

== Overall summary ==
=== Season summary ===
Games played	28 (20 Thai League, 1 FA Cup, 1 League Cup, 6 AFC Champions League Two)
Games won	13 (9 Thai League, 0 FA Cup, 1 League Cup, 3 AFC Champions League Two)
Games drawn	7 (6 Thai League, 0 FA Cup, 0 League Cup, 1 AFC Champions League Two)
Games lost	8 (5 Thai League, 1 FA Cup, 0 League Cup, 2 AFC Champions League Two)
Goals scored	30 (16 Thai League, 1 FA Cup, 4 League Cup, 9 AFC Champions League Two)
Goals conceded	19 (6 Thai League, 2 FA Cup, 0 League Cup, 11 AFC Champions League Two)
Goal difference	+11
Clean sheets	7 (4 Thai League, 0 FA Cup, 1 League Cup, 2 AFC Champions League Two)
Best result	5-1 vs Singha Chiangrai United (19 Aug 24)
Worst result	2-5 vs Lion City Sailors (5 Dec 24)
Most appearances	Worachit Kanitsribampen (27)
Top scorer	Lonsana Doumbouya (6)
Points	33

=== Score overview ===
Opposition	Home score	Away score	Double
BG Pathum United	1-2	0-1	No
Buriram United	0-0	1-0	No
Khonkaen United	1-2	2-1	No
Lamphun Warriors	2-1	2-3	No
Muangthong United	1-1	2-1	No
Nakhon Pathom United	2-0		
Nakhon Ratchasima	3-2	4-2	Yes
Nongbua Pitchaya	2-1		
PT Prachuap	0-2	0-0	No
Ratchaburi	3-3	2-2	No
Rayong		3-1	
Singha Chiangrai United	5-1	0-1	No
Sukhothai	4-1	2-3	No
True Bangkok United	0-0	0-2	No
Uthai Thani	1-1	1-1	No
