= Chinnawat =

Chinnawat may refer to:

- Chinnawat Wongchai (born 1996), Thai footballer
- Chinnawat family or Shinawatra family, Thai family
