= Asnawi Mangkualam =

Indonesian footballer

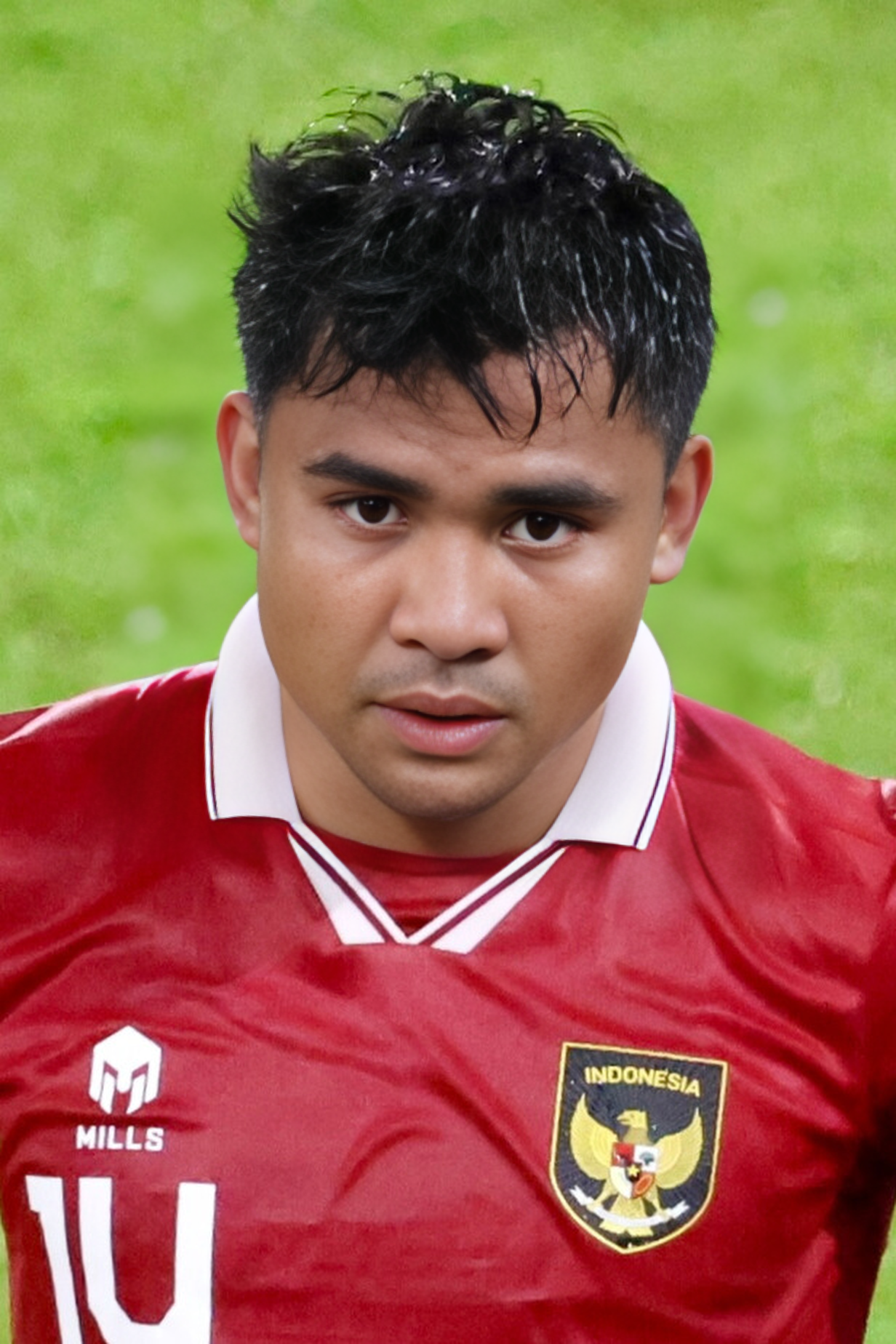
- Asnawi playing for Indonesia in 2023

Personal information
- Full name: Asnawi Mangkualam Bahar
- Date of birth: 4 October 1999 (age 27)
- Place of birth: Makassar, Indonesia
- Height: 1.74 m (5 ft 9 in)
- Position: Right-back

Team information
- Current team: Port
- Number: 3

Youth career
- 2014–2015: PSM Makassar
- 2015–2016: PON South Sulawesi

Senior career*
Years	Team	Apps	(Gls)
2016	Persiba Balikpapan	8	(2)
2017–2021	PSM Makassar	44	(2)
2021–2023	Ansan Greeners	40	(2)
2023–2024	Jeonnam Dragons	26	(0)
2024–	Port	56	(1)

International career^{‡}
2013	Indonesia U16	8	(0)
2016–2018	Indonesia U19	16	(0)
2017–2022	Indonesia U23	32	(2)
2017–	Indonesia	50	(2)
Medal record
Men's football
Representing Indonesia
AFF Championship
Runner-up	2020 Singapore	Team
Southeast Asian Games
Silver medal – second place	2019 Philippines	Team
Bronze medal – third place	2017 Kuala Lumpur	Team
Bronze medal – third place	2021 Vietnam	Team
AFF U-22 Youth Championship
Winner	2019 Cambodia	Team
AFF U-19 Youth Championship
Third place	2017 Myanmar
Third place	2018 Indonesia	Team
AFF U-16 Youth Championship
Runner-up	2013 Myanmar
- * Club domestic league appearances and goals as of 18 January 2026 ‡ National team caps and goals as of 21 December 2024

Asnawi Mangkualam Bahar (born 4 October 1999), better known as Asnawi, is an Indonesian professional footballer who plays either as a right-back for Thai League 1 club Port and the Indonesia national team.

== Club career ==
=== Persiba Balikpapan ===
After spending years in the youth squads of PSM Makassar, Asnawi joined Persiba Balikpapan for the 2016 Indonesia Soccer Championship A (a temporary tournament that replaced the defunct Indonesian Super League after the PSSI schism that led to the 2015 FIFA suspension on Indonesia). He soon became the youngest player to score in the competition, as he netted a goal at just 17 years and five days in a match against Bali United at Kapten I Wayan Dipta Stadium.

=== PSM Makassar ===
After Liga 1 emerged as the stable football competition in the country, Asnawi in 2017 returned to PSM Makassar, where he made his debut against Persela Lamongan in the Indonesia President's Cup, the league's pre-season tournament. On 16 April, Asnawi made his Liga 1 debut with PSM in a 3–1 win against the same opponent where he played the full 90 minutes. Asnawi finished the season with only 9 appearances.

Despite his young age, he rapidly established himself as one of the club's most talented and promising players, thanks to his versatility and his technical skills. In the 2018 season, he made 14 appearances for the club, much better than the previous season.

In the following season, Asnawi made his first international appearance for the club in the 2019 AFC Cup group stage on 17 April 2019 against Philippines Football League club Kaya-Iloilo, he played as a substitutes in a 1–2 win. On 3 May 2019, Asnawi provided an assist for his compatriot Muhammad Rahmat in a 2–0 away draw in the second leg of PSM' 2018–19 Piala Indonesia quarter-final against Bhayangkara. With an aggregate of 4–4, PSM became the first team to qualify for the Piala Indonesia semi-final, after winning away goals over Bhayangkara. He won his first trophy with the club in August 2019, played the full 90 minutes in a match against Persija Jakarta in the second leg of Piala Indonesia final. He also won the tourney's Best Young Player award. He scored his first league goal the same month, opening the scoring in a 2–1 home win over PS Barito Putera. During the 2019 league season, he made 18 league appearances and score one goal for PSM Makassar.

On 26 February 2020, Asnawi provided an assist for his compatriot Giancarlo in a 3–1 home win in the 2020 AFC Cup group stage against Myanmar National League club Shan United. He scored his first goal of the 2020 season in the same month, opening the scoring in a 1–1 draw over Persita Tangerang at the Benteng Taruna Stadium, Tangerang. PSM's management revealed that they agreed to release Asnawi even though his contract still has a season left. The decision came out because he wanted to continue his career abroad. Moreover, Liga 1 is not yet clear when it will be rolled out. Asnawi finished the season with only one goal in 3 league appearances, because the league was officially discontinued due to the COVID-19 pandemic.

=== Ansan Greeners ===
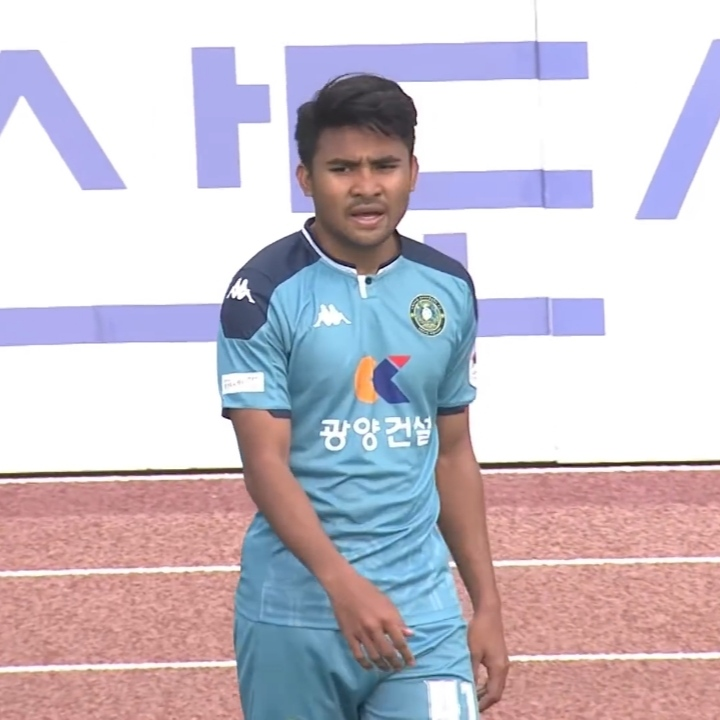
Asnawi playing for Ansan Greeners in 2021

In January 2021, Asnawi joined K League 2 side Ansan Greeners on a permanent deal. In the process, the Greeners became the first K League team to ever register a Southeast Asian player, while Asnawi himself became the first Indonesian footballer to ever play in the Korean league.

Upon signing for the Greeners, Asnawi revealed that Shin Tae-yong himself reportedly convinced him to pursue an opportunity abroad. The transfer also gained attention from Ansan's local Indonesian community as well as local fans, with the club's official social media accounts receiving a significant increase in followers.

After being unavailable for the first games of the season due to COVID-19 self-isolation rules, Asnawi made his debut for the Greeners, playing the entirety of a 1–0 win against K4 League club Yangpyeong in the Korean FA Cup on 28 March 2021. On 3 April 2021, he made his league debut, playing 61 minutes in a 1–1 draw with Busan IPark. Asnawi was able to made back-to-back appearances in the next five games and registered his first league assist in the Greeners' 1–0 win over Daejeon Hana Citizen on 24 April 2021. Asnawi finished his first season with 1,004 minutes played in 14 league matches.

On 23 July 2022, Asnawi scored his first goal in a 3–1 home win over Gimpo. Eight days later, he scored again in a 3–0 league win over the Jeonnam Dragons, where he would later join from Ansan. Asnawi further improved in his second season, recording 1,646 minutes of play in 27 matches in two competitions, as well as scoring two goals and contribute three assists.

=== Jeonnam Dragons ===
On 27 January 2023, Asnawi officially joined fellow K League 2 side Jeonnam Dragons on a permanent deal. On 1 March, Asnawi made his debut with Jeonnam Dragons in a match against FC Anyang where he played the full 90 minutes as a right-midfield. He picked up his first red card for the club in a 0–5 defeat against Gyeongnam four days later. Despite this, Asnawi returned to the first team and playing 82 minutes for the side on 8 April, where he give two assists and played as a left-back for the first time under coach Lee Jang-kwan in a 2–2 draw over Seongnam.

=== Port ===
On 26 January 2024, Thai League 1 club, Port announced the signing of Asnawi where he is set to join the team straight after the 2023 AFC Asian Cup. On 14 February 2024, Asnawi made his debut for Port as a substitute in a 4–3 win against Muangthong United.

On 19 October 2024, Asnawi scored his first and decisive goal for the club against Nakhon Ratchasima in a 3–2 win.

== International career ==
=== Youth ===
Asnawi was often a key player for Indonesia's national Under-16, Under-19 and Under-23 squads.

Asnawi made his international debut for the senior team on 21 March 2017, when he got on the pitch as a substitute during a friendly match against Myanmar. In the process, he broke a record for the youngest player to win an international senior cap for Indonesia, at the age of 17 years and 167 days. Later, this record was broken by Ronaldo Kwateh at the age of 17 years and 104 days on 27 January 2022. He was part of the Under-23 squad that won silver in the 2019 Southeast Asian Games in the Philippines and voted into the tournament's best eleven.

=== Senior ===
In November 2021, Indonesian coach Shin Tae-yong called Asnawi up to the Indonesia national team for the friendly matches in Turkey against Afghanistan and Myanmar. In December 2021, he was named in Indonesian's squad for the 2020 AFF Championship in Singapore. On 12 December, Asnawi scored his first international goal with a penalty against Laos at the 2020 AFF Championship in an eventual 1–5 win.

On 19 January 2024, Asnawi scored a penalty against Vietnam as the sole goal of the game in a 1–0 victory, in a group stage match of the 2023 AFC Asian Cup. This goal proved decisive in Indonesia's qualification to the round of 16, as it earned the 3 points needed to qualify as one of the best third-placed teams.

==== Controversies ====
However, during the match against Singapore on 25 December 2021, Asnawi drew criticism from both sides after he was caught mocking a clearly distraught Singaporean winger Faris Ramli after the latter missed a stoppage-time penalty, with Asnawi warned by Shin that he would be removed from the national team should it happen again.

== Personal life ==
Asnawi is the son of Bahar Muharram, a former Indonesian footballer himself currently serving as an assistant coach at PSM Makassar, the club he played between 2017 and 2021. His cousin, Sulthan Zaky, who is also a footballer and currently plays for PSM Makassar.

== Career statistics ==
=== Club ===
As of 18 January 2026

Club	Season	League			Cup (Note: Includes Piala Indonesia, Korean FA Cup, Thai FA Cup)		Continental		Other (Note: Appearances in Indonesia President's Cup)		Total	
Club	Season	Division	Apps	Goals	Apps	Goals	Apps	Goals	Apps	Goals	Apps	Goals
Persiba Balikpapan	2016	ISC A	8	2	0	0	0	0	0	0	8	2
PSM Makassar	2017	Liga 1	9	0	0	0	0	0	2	0	9	0
PSM Makassar	2018	Liga 1	14	0	0	0	0	0	2	0	14	0
PSM Makassar	2019	Liga 1	18	1	5	0	5 (Note: Appearances in AFC Cup)	0	0	0	28	1
PSM Makassar	2020	Liga 1	3	1	0	0	4	0	0	0	7	1
PSM Makassar	Total		44	2	5	0	9	0	4	0	62	2
Ansan Greeners	2021	K League 2	14	0	1	0	—		0	0	15	0
Ansan Greeners	2022	K League 2	26	2	1	0	—		0	0	27	2
Ansan Greeners	Total		40	2	2	0	0	0	0	0	42	2
Jeonnam Dragons	2023	K League 2	26	0	1	0	—		0	0	27	0
Port	2023–24	Thai League 1	12	0	0	0	—		0	0	12	0
Port	2024–25	Thai League 1	27	1	1	0	6 (Note: Appearances in AFC Champions League Two)	0	2	0	36	1
Port	2025–26	Thai League 1	16	0	1	0	0	0	0	0	17	0
Port	Total		55	1	2	0	6	0	2	0	65	1
Career total			172	7	10	0	15	0	6	0	204	7

=== International ===
As of match played 21 December 2024

Appearances and goals by national team and year
National team	Year	Apps	Goals
Indonesia	2017	1	0
Indonesia	2021	15	1
Indonesia	2022	8	0
Indonesia	2023	12	0
Indonesia	2024	14	1
Total		50	2

As of match played 9 December 2024
Scores and results list Indonesia's goal tally first, score column indicates score after each Asnawi goal.

List of international goals scored by Asnawi Mangkualam
No.	Date	Venue	Cap	Opponent	Score	Result	Competition
1	12 December 2021	Bishan Stadium, Bishan, Singapore	11	Laos	1–0	5–1	2020 AFF Championship
2	19 January 2024	Abdullah bin Khalifa Stadium, Doha, Qatar	39	Vietnam	1–0	1–0	2023 AFC Asian Cup

== Honours ==
=== Club ===
==== PSM Makassar ====
- Piala Indonesia: 2018–19

=== Port ===
- Thai League Cup: 2025–26
- Piala Presiden: 2025

=== International ===
==== Indonesia U16 ====
- AFF U-16 Youth Championship runner-up: 2013

==== Indonesia U19 ====
- AFF U-19 Youth Championship third place: 2017, 2018

==== Indonesia U23 ====
- SEA Games silver medal: 2019; bronze medal: 2017, 2021
- AFF U-22 Youth Championship: 2019

==== Indonesia ====
- AFF Championship runner-up: 2020

=== Individual ===
- Piala Indonesia Best Young Player: 2018–19
- Liga 1 Team of the Season: 2019
- Indonesian Soccer Awards: Favorite Young Footballer 2019
- K League 2 Player of the Month: April 2021
- Thai League Best XI Mid-Season: 2024–25

Preceded by Fachruddin Aryanto	Indonesian Captain; 2023–2024	Succeeded by Jay Idzes
