= Frans Putros =

Footballer (born 1993)

Personal information
- Full name: Frans Dhia Jirjis Haddad
- Date of birth: 14 July 1993 (age 33)
- Place of birth: Aarhus, Denmark
- Height: 1.81 m (5 ft 11 in)
- Positions: Defender; defensive midfielder

Team information
- Current team: Cong An Hanoi
- Number: 55

Youth career
- –2004: Skovbakken
- 2004–2012: AGF

Senior career*
Years	Team	Apps	(Gls)
2012–2013	AGF	3	(0)
2013–2014	→ Silkeborg (loan)	16	(0)
2014–2015	Silkeborg	12	(0)
2015–2018	Fredericia	58	(13)
2018–2020	Hobro	39	(1)
2020–2022	Viborg	58	(1)
2022–2025	Port	72	(3)
2025–2026	Persib Bandung	28	(1)
2026–	Cong An Hanoi	2	(0)

International career^{‡}
2012–2013	Denmark U20	3	(0)
2013–2014	Denmark U21	1	(0)
2018–	Iraq	29	(0)
- * Club domestic league appearances and goals as of 10 September 2026 ‡ National team caps and goals as of 27 July 2026

Frans Dhia Jirjis Haddad (born 14 July 1993), commonly known as Frans Putros (Arabic: فرانس بطرس; Syriac: ܦܪܢܣ ܦܘܛܪܘܣ), is a professional footballer who plays as a defender or defensive midfielder for V.League 1 club Cong An Hanoi. Born in Denmark, he represents the Iraq national team.

== Early life ==
Putros was born on 14 July 1993 in Aarhus, Denmark, and is of Assyrian ethnicity from Iraq.

== Club career ==
Putros began his youth career at IK Skovbakken, and was picked up by AGF in 2004, where he played a number of years in the youth and reserve teams for the club. He made his Danish Superliga debut on 16 November 2012, playing the full 90 minutes in a match against FC Nordsjælland.

In fall 2013, Putros was loaned to Silkeborg IF, where he was reunited with the former AGF assistant coach Jesper Sørensen, who had become the head coach of Silkeborg IF. After a successful stay in Silkeborg, Putros signed a permanent contract at the end of 2013. Putros joined Fredericia in 2015; he decided to run out his contract at the end of 2017 to sign a two-year deal with Hobro IK.

Putros joined Hobro IK in August 2017. He left the club at the end of 2019, where his contract expired. On 11 January 2020, he signed a two-and-a-half-year contract with Viborg FF. He later helped them to win the 2020–21 Danish 1st Division league title.

=== Port ===
On 23 June 2022, Putros signed with Thai League 1 club Port.

=== Persib Bandung ===
After several seasons in Denmark, Putros moved abroad to Indonesia, signing with Persib Bandung. He played a key role in the club's Liga 1 title-winning campaign in the 2025–26 season, making 28 league appearances and scoring one goal. His contract with Persib expired at the end of the season, and after unsuccessful negotiations for a new deal, the club announced his departure on 16 July 2026.

=== Công An Hà Nội ===
On 24 July 2026, Vietnamese V.League 1 defending champions Cong An Hanoi officially announced the signing of Putros for the 2026–27 season. The move came shortly after Putros had represented Iraq at the 2026 FIFA World Cup.

== International career ==
Putros made his debut for the Iraq national team in a friendly 3–0 win over Palestine on 4 August 2018. He was part of the 2019 AFC Asian Cup squad where he make only appearance against Vietnam.

Putros was then called up for the 2021 FIFA Arab Cup playing his only game against Bahrain.

Putros was then called up for the 2023 AFC Asian Cup where he played in all group stage matches for Iraq.

Putros was then selected in Iraq squad in the 2026 FIFA World Cup where he played the entire match against Senegal on 27 June 2026.

== Career statistics ==
=== Club ===
As of match played 11 August 2026

Appearances and goals by club, season and competition
Club	Season	League			National cup		League Cup		Continental		Other		Total	
Club	Season	Division	Apps	Goals	Apps	Goals	Apps	Goals	Apps	Goals	Apps	Goals	Apps	Goals
AGF	2011–12	Danish Superliga	0	0	0	0	—		—		—		0	0
AGF	2012–13	Danish Superliga	2	0	1	0	—		—		—		3	0
AGF	2013–14	Danish Superliga	1	0	1	0	—		—		—		2	0
AGF	Total		3	0	2	0	—		—		—		5	0
Silkeborg (loan)	2013–14	1.Division	16	0	0	0	—		—		—		16	0
Silkeborg	2014–15	Danish Superliga	12	0	2	0	—		—		—		14	0
Frederica	2015–16	1.Division	12	2	0	0	—		—		—		12	2
Frederica	2016–17	1.Division	29	3	3	3	—		—		—		32	6
Frederica	2017–18	1.Division	17	8	4	2	—		—		—		21	10
Frederica	Total		58	13	7	5	—		—		—		65	18
Hobro	2017–18	Danish Superliga	10	1	1	0	—		—		—		11	1
Hobro	2018–19	Danish Superliga	18	0	3	0	—		—		—		21	0
Hobro	2019–20	Danish Superliga	10	0	0	0	—		—		—		10	0
Hobro	Total		39	1	4	0	—		—		—		43	1
Viborg	2019–20	Danish Superliga	8	0	—		—		—		—		8	0
Viborg	2020–21	Danish Superliga	23	1	2	0	—		—		3 (Note: Appearances in Promotion playoffs)	0	28	1
Viborg	2021–22	Danish Superliga	27	0	0	0	—		—		—		27	0
Viborg	Total		58	1	2	0	—		0	0	3	0	63	1
Port	2022–23	Thai League 1	25	2	4	0	0	0	—		—		29	2
Port	2023–24	Thai League 1	25	1	1	0	1	0	1 (Note: Appearance in AFC Champions League)	0	—		28	1
Port	2024–25	Thai League 1	22	0	1	0	3	0	7 (Note: Appearances in AFC Champions League Two)	1	—		33	1
Port	Total		72	3	6	0	4	0	8	1	0	0	90	4
Persib Bandung	2025–26	Super League	28	1	—		—		8	1	—		36	2
Cong An Hanoi	2026–27	V.League 1	0	0	0	0	—		1 (Note: Appearances in AFC Champions League Elite)	0	0	0	1	0
Career total			284	19	23	5	4	0	17	2	3	0	331	26

=== International ===
As of match played 10 June 2026

Appearances and goals by national team and year
National team	Year	Apps	Goals
Iraq	2018	3	0
Iraq	2019	1	0
Iraq	2021	4	0
Iraq	2022	1	0
Iraq	2023	5	0
Iraq	2024	6	0
Iraq	2025	5	0
Iraq	2026	3	0
Total		28	0

== Honours ==
Silkeborg

- Danish 1st Division: 2013–14

Viborg

- Danish 1st Division: 2020–21

Persib Bandung

- Super League: 2025–26

Cong An Hanoi

- Vietnamese Super Cup: 2026

== See also ==
- List of Iraq international footballers
