= Chanukun Karin =

Thai professional footballer

Personal information
- Full name: Chanukun Karin
- Date of birth: 24 April 1997 (age 29)
- Place of birth: Chiang Rai, Thailand
- Height: 1.68 m (5 ft 6 in)
- Positions: Attacking midfielder; winger

Team information
- Current team: Port
- Number: 37

Youth career
- 2013–2016: Chiangrai United

Senior career*
Years	Team	Apps	(Gls)
2014–2016	Chiangrai United	0	(0)
2014	→ Uttaradit (loan)	12	(2)
2015	→ Nan (loan)	10	(0)
2016–2021	North Bangkok University	49	(8)
2021–2023	Police Tero	56	(5)
2023–	Port	42	(3)

International career^{‡}
2023–	Thailand	3	(0)
- * Club domestic league appearances and goals as of 4 October 2025 ‡ National team caps and goals as of 17 October 2023

Chanukun Karin (Thai: ชานุกูล ก๋ารินทร์, born 24 April 1997) is a Thai professional footballer who plays as an attacking midfielder or a winger for Thai League 1 club Port and the Thailand national team.

== Early life ==
Karin is from Khun Tan District, Chiang Rai Province, studied at Chiang Rai Provincial Administrative Organization, and was scouted by a team from Bangkok, but he never joined the club.

== Career ==
Karin started his career with Chiangrai United, going out on loan to Uttaradit and Nan, before joining North Bangkok University and later Police Tero, where he first attracted attention from the Thailand national football team.

== International career ==
On 14 March 2023, Chanukun was called up to the Thailand national team for the friendly matches against Syria and United Arab Emirates.

== Career statistics ==
=== Club ===
As of 4 October 2025

Club performance			League		Cup		League Cup		Continental		Total	
Season	Club	League	Apps	Goals	Apps	Goals	Apps	Goals	Apps	Goals	Apps	Goals
Thailand			League		FA Cup		League Cup		Asia		Total	
2019	North Bangkok University	Thai League 3	25	2	0	0	0	0	—		25	2
2020–21	North Bangkok University	Thai League 3	24	6	0	0	0	0	—		24	6
2021–22	Police Tero	Thai League 1	29	1	4	0	2	0	—		35	1
2022–23	Police Tero	Thai League 1	27	4	5	1	0	0	—		32	5
2023–24	Port	Thai League 1	21	1	0	0	1	1	—		22	2
2024–25	Port	Thai League 1	14	1	0	0	1	0	3 (Note: Appearances in AFC Champions League Two)	0	18	1
2025–26	Port	Thai League 1	7	1	0	0	0	0	—		7	1

== Style of play ==
Chanukun mainly operated as an attacker before mainly operating as a midfielder starting from the age of fifteen.

== Honour ==
North Bangkok University

- Thai League 3 Bangkok Metropolitan Region (1): 2020–21
- Thai League 4 Bangkok Metropolitan Region (2): 2017, 2018

Port

- Thai League Cup (1): 2025–26
- Piala Presiden (1): 2025
