= Football at the 2021 SEA Games =

Sports tournament in Vietnam

- Venues: Việt Trì Stadium, Phú Thọ; Thiên Trường Stadium, Nam Định; Mỹ Đình National Stadium, Hà Nội; Cẩm Phả Stadium, Quảng Ninh
- Dates: 6–22 May 2022
- Nations: 10

Medalists
gold medal	Vietnam (men); Vietnam (women)
silver medal	Thailand (men); Thailand (women)
bronze medal	Indonesia (men); Philippines (women)

The football tournament at the 2021 SEA Games was held from 6 to 22 May 2022 in Vietnam. In addition to the host city Hanoi, matches were held in Việt Trì, Nam Định and Cẩm Phả.

Associations affiliated with FIFA may send teams to participate in the tournament. There were no age restrictions on women's teams. For men's teams, with the postponement of the Games from 2021 to 2022 due to the COVID-19 pandemic, the age limit was raised from under-22 (set since 2017) to under-23 (born on or after 1 January 1999) with a maximum of three overage players allowed.

== Competition schedule ==
The following is the competition schedule for the football competitions:

G	Group stage	½	Semifinals	B	3rd place play-off	F	Final

Event	Fri 6	Sat 7	Sun 8	Mon 9	Tue 10	Wed 11	Thu 12	Fri 13	Sat 14	Sun 15	Mon 16	Tue 17	Wed 18	Thu 19	Fri 20	Sat 21		Sun 22	
Men	G	G	G	G	G	G		G	G	G	G			½				B	F
Women				G	G	G		G	G	G			½			B	F		

== Venues ==
A total of 4 venues across 4 cities are used to host football matches. Mỹ Đình National Stadium hosted the Men's Bronze medal match and the Men's Gold medal match.

Hà Nội	Football at the 2021 SEA Games (Vietnam)	Phú Thọ
Mỹ Đình National Stadium	Football at the 2021 SEA Games (Vietnam)	Việt Trì Stadium
Capacity: 40,192	Football at the 2021 SEA Games (Vietnam)	Capacity: 16,000
	Football at the 2021 SEA Games (Vietnam)	Việt Trì 12 January 2022
Nam Định	Football at the 2021 SEA Games (Vietnam)	Quảng Ninh
Thiên Trường Stadium	Football at the 2021 SEA Games (Vietnam)	Cẩm Phả Stadium
Capacity: 30,000	Football at the 2021 SEA Games (Vietnam)	Capacity: 16,000

== Participating nations ==
Nation	Men's	Women's
Brunei	No	No
Cambodia	Yes	Yes
Indonesia	Yes	No
Laos	Yes	Yes
Malaysia	Yes	No
Myanmar	Yes	Yes
Philippines	Yes	Yes
Singapore	Yes	Yes
Thailand	Yes	Yes
Timor-Leste	Yes	No
Vietnam	Yes	Yes
Total: 11 NOCs	10	7

== Men's tournament ==
=== Group stage ===
- All times are Vietnam Standard Time (UTC+7).

==== Group A ====
Pos	Team	Pld	W	D	L	GF	GA	GD	Pts	Qualification
1	Vietnam (H)	4	3	1	0	6	0	+6	10	Advance to Semi-finals
2	Indonesia	4	3	0	1	11	5	+6	9	Advance to Semi-finals
3	Myanmar	4	2	0	2	7	8	−1	6	
4	Philippines	4	1	1	2	6	7	−1	4	
5	Timor-Leste	4	0	0	4	3	13	−10	0	

Source: FIFA
(H) Hosts

==== Group B ====
Pos	Team	Pld	W	D	L	GF	GA	GD	Pts	Qualification
1	Thailand	4	3	0	1	12	2	+10	9	Advance to Semi-finals
2	Malaysia	4	2	2	0	9	6	+3	8	Advance to Semi-finals
3	Singapore	4	1	2	1	5	9	−4	5	
4	Cambodia	4	1	1	2	6	9	−3	4	
5	Laos	4	0	1	3	4	10	−6	1	

Source: FIFA

=== Knockout stage ===
Semi-finals
19 May – Phú Thọ
Vietnam (a.e.t.)	1
Malaysia	0
19 May – Nam Định
Thailand (a.e.t.)	1
Indonesia	0

Gold medal match
22 May – Hà Nội
Vietnam	1
Thailand	0
Bronze medal match
22 May – Hà Nội
Malaysia	1 (3)
Indonesia (p)	1 (4)

=== Winners ===
2021 SEA Games Men's Tournament
(Vietnam)
Vietnam
Third title

== Women's tournament ==
=== Group stage ===
- All times are Vietnam Standard Time (UTC+7).

==== Group A ====
Pos	Team	Pld	W	D	L	GF	GA	GD	Pts	Qualification
1	Vietnam (H)	2	2	0	0	9	1	+8	6	Advance to Semi-finals
2	Philippines	2	1	0	1	6	2	+4	3	Advance to Semi-finals
3	Cambodia	2	0	0	2	0	12	−12	0	
4	Indonesia	0	0	0	0	0	0	0	0	Withdrew

Source: FIFA
(H) Hosts

==== Group B ====
Pos	Team	Pld	W	D	L	GF	GA	GD	Pts	Qualification
1	Thailand	3	2	1	0	9	1	+8	7	Advance to Semi-finals
2	Myanmar	3	2	1	0	5	1	+4	7	Advance to Semi-finals
3	Singapore	3	1	0	2	1	4	−3	3	
4	Laos	3	0	0	3	0	9	−9	0	

Source: FIFA

=== Knockout stage ===
Semi-finals
18 May – Quảng Ninh
Vietnam	1
Myanmar	0
18 May – Quảng Ninh
Thailand	3
Philippines	0

Gold medal match
21 May – Quảng Ninh
Vietnam	1
Thailand	0
Bronze medal match
21 May – Quảng Ninh
Myanmar	1
Philippines	2

=== Winners ===
2021 SEA Games Women's Tournament

Vietnam
Seventh title

== Medal summary ==
=== Medal table ===
* Host nation (Vietnam)

Rank	Nation	Gold	Silver	Bronze	Total
1	Vietnam (VIE)*	2	0	0	2
2	Thailand (THA)	0	2	0	2
3	Indonesia (INA)	0	0	1	1
3	Philippines (PHI)	0	0	1	1
Totals (4 entries)		2	2	2	6

=== Medalists ===
Event	Gold	Silver	Bronze
Men's tournament	Vietnam (VIE); Quan Văn Chuẩn; Lê Văn Xuân; Vũ Tiến Long; Nguyễn Thanh Bình; Lương Duy Cương; Dụng Quang Nho; Lê Văn Đô; Nguyễn Hai Long; Nguyễn Tiến Linh; Lý Công Hoàng Anh; Nguyễn Văn Tùng; Phan Tuấn Tài; Nguyễn Trọng Long; Nguyễn Hoàng Đức; Huỳnh Công Đến; Đỗ Hùng Dũng; Nhâm Mạnh Dũng; Nguyễn Văn Toản; Hồ Thanh Minh; Bùi Hoàng Việt Anh	Thailand (THA); Kawin Thamsatchanan; Nakin Wisetchat; Mehti Sarakham; Jonathan Khemdee; Anusak Jaiphet; Airfan Doloh; Ekanit Panya; Korawich Tasa; Patrik Gustavsson; Worachit Kanitsribampen; William Weidersjö; Narakorn Noomchansakul; Teerasak Poeiphimai; Jakkit Palapon; Jaturapat Sattham; Chonnapat Buaphan; Ben Davis; Weerathep Pomphan; Chayapipat Supunpasuch; Supanut Suadsong	Indonesia (INA); Adi Satryo; Alfeandra Dewangga; Firza Andika; Rizky Ridho; Marc Klok; Marselino Ferdinan; Witan Sulaeman; Ronaldo Kwateh; Egy Maulana Vikri; Saddil Ramdani; Muhamad Ridwan; Rachmat Irianto; Asnawi Mangkualam; Ricky Kambuaya; Ilham Rio Fahmi; Syahrian Abimanyu; Irfan Jauhari; Fachruddin Aryanto; Ernando Ari Sutaryadi
Women's tournament	Vietnam (VIE); Lại Thị Tuyết; Lương Thị Thu Thương; Chương Thị Kiều; Trần Thị Thu; Hoàng Thị Loan; Phạm Hoàng Quỳnh; Nguyễn Thị Tuyết Dung; Trần Thị Thùy Trang; Huỳnh Như; Nguyễn Thị Tuyết Ngân; Ngân Thị Vạn Sự; Phạm Hải Yến; Lê Thị Diễm My; Trần Thị Kim Thanh; Nguyễn Thị Bích Thùy; Dương Thị Vân; Trần Thị Phương Thảo; Nguyễn Thị Vạn; Nguyễn Thị Thanh Nhã; Khổng Thị Hằng	Thailand (THA); Waraporn Boonsing; Kanjanaporn Saenkhun; Irravadee Makris; Phornphirun Philawan; Amornrat Utchai; Ploychompoo Somnuek; Silawan Intamee; Nipawan Panyosuk; Warunee Phetwiset; Sunisa Srangthaisong; Chatchawan Rodthong; Nutwadee Pram-nak; Kanyanat Chetthabutr; Saowalak Pengngam; Orapin Waenngoen; Uraiporn Yongkul; Taneekarn Dangda; Yada Sengyong; Janista Jinantuya; Wilaiporn Boothduang	Philippines (PHI); Inna Palacios; Malea Cesar; Dominique Randle; Jaclyn Sawicki; Hali Long; Tahnai Annis; Camille Rodriguez; Sarina Bolden; Jessica Miclat; Ryley Bugay; Anicka Castañeda; Kaya Hawkinson; Chantelle Maniti; Isabella Flanigan; Carleigh Frilles; Sofia Harrison; Alisha del Campo; Olivia Davies-McDaniel; Eva Madarang; Quinley Quezada
