= Sittha Boonlha =

Thai footballer (born 2004)

Personal information
- Full name: Sittha Boonlha
- Date of birth: 2 September 2004 (age 22)
- Place of birth: Bangkok, Thailand
- Height: 1.86 m (6 ft 1 in)
- Position: Defensive midfielder

Team information
- Current team: Port
- Number: 47

Youth career
- 2015–2017: Muangthong United
- 2018–2021: Assumption College Thonburi

Senior career*
Years	Team	Apps	(Gls)
2022–	Port	18	(0)
2022–2023	→ Customs United (loan)	28	(1)

International career^{‡}
2019–2020	Thailand U16	10	(0)
2022–2023	Thailand U19	9	(1)
2021–	Thailand U23	14	(0)
- * Club domestic league appearances and goals as of 9 February 2025 ‡ National team caps and goals as of 28 January 2024

Sittha Boonlha (Thai: สิทธา บุญหล้า; born 2 September 2004) is a Thai professional footballer who plays as a defensive midfielder for Thai League 1 club Port.

== Club career ==
Sittha was a member of the Muangthong United youth academy before he joined high school team Assumption College Thonburi. After his graduation, he signed for Thai League 1 side Port in January 2022. He made his debut in Port 0–3's defeat against Ulsan Hyundai as part of the 2022 AFC Champions League qualifying play-offs.

In August 2022, Sittha was loaned to Thai League 2 club Customs United. He made a total of 31 league appearances and scored one goal for the club, helping them finish third in the league.

In June 2023, alongside Teerasak Poeiphimai, he was sent abroad to train with Leicester U21 for a month.

== International career ==
Sittha featured in the 2022 AFF U-23 Championship with Thailand U23 and reached the final, where Thailand was defeated 0–1 by Vietnam.

In September 2023, Sittha was named in Thailand Olympic 21-men squad for the 2022 Asian Games. He appeared in three out of four matches during the tournament as Thailand managed to reach the round of 16.
