= Noboru Shimura =

Japanese footballer

Noboru Shimura 志村 謄
Personal information
- Full name: Noboru Shimura
- Date of birth: 11 March 1993 (age 33)
- Place of birth: Kawagoe, Saitama, Japan
- Height: 1.78 m (5 ft 10 in)
- Positions: Defensive midfielder; centre-back

Team information
- Current team: Port
- Number: 33

Youth career
- Saitama Heisei High School

Senior career*
Years	Team	Apps	(Gls)
2014	Japan Soccer College	0	(0)
2015	Berane	11	(0)
2015–2016	Mornar	30	(1)
2016	Bokelj	0	(0)
2016–2017	Sutjeska Nikšić	31	(1)
2017–2023	Spartak Subotica	147	(11)
2019	→ Machida Zelvia (loan)	2	(0)
2023–	Port	69	(12)
- * Club domestic league appearances and goals as of 2 May 2026

Noboru Shimura (志村 謄, Noboru Shimura; born 11 March 1993) is a Japanese professional footballer who plays for Port in the Thai League 1. He mainly operates as a defensive midfielder, while being capable of playing as a centre-back as well.

== Club career ==
=== Montenegro ===
Born in Kawagoe, Saitama, Japan, Shimura moved to Montenegrin First League in February 2015. Previously, he had played with university team in his home country. After six-month period with Berane making 11 appearances, he moved to Mornar. Shimura noted 35 appearances in both Montenegrin domestic competitions for the 2015–16 season, scoring a goal in 2–1 away victory over Zeta on 20 November 2015. Next the short spell with Bokelj in 2016 and both of matches in the first qualifying round for 2016–17 UEFA Europa League against Vojvodina he spent on the bench as an unused substitution, Shimura joined Sutjeska Nikšić for the league part of the same season. Playing for the club he noted 31 league matches with 1 goal, as also 7 matches with 1 goal in the Montenegrin Cup, including the final game against Grbalj after which Sutjeska won the competition. Behind the end of a season, he left the club.

=== Spartak Subotica ===
After several season playing in Montenegro, Shimura moved to Serbia and joined Spartak Subotica in summer 2017, penning a three-year professional contract with new club. Shimura made his Serbian SuperLiga debut in opening match of the 2017–18 season, in 2–1 home win versus OFK Bačka under coach Aleksandar Veselinović, when he also noted an assist for a goal. Making an official appearance for Spartak, Shimura became the first Japanese footballer in the club history. Shimura scored his first goal for the club in 2–0 away victory over Rad. As a coincidence, Shimura also scored his next goal for the club in 2–0 win against the same opponent on 18 March 2018. Finally, Shimura scored his third season goal in 2–0 away victory over Vojvodina on 22 April 2018.

==== Machida Zelvia (loan) ====
In February 2019, Shimura return to Japan to join J2 League club Machida Zelvia on loan.

=== Port ===
After seven years at Spartak Subotica, Shimura moved to Southeast Asia to signed with Thai League 1 club Port on 5 June 2023.

== Career statistics ==
As of 18 January 2026

Appearances and goals by club, season and competition
Club	Season	League			Cup		League Cup		Continental		Other		Total	
Club	Season	Division	Apps	Goals	Apps	Goals	Apps	Goals	Apps	Goals	Apps	Goals	Apps	Goals
Berane	2014–15	Montenegrin First League	11	0	0	0	—		—		—		11	0
Mornar	2015–16	Montenegrin First League	30	1	5	0	—		—		—		35	1
Bokelj	2016–17	Montenegrin First League	0	0	0	0	—		0	0	—		0	0
Sutjeska Nikšić	2016–17	Montenegrin First League	31	1	7	1	—		—		—		38	2
Spartak Subotica	2017–18	Serbian SuperLiga	34	3	1	0	—		—		—		35	3
Spartak Subotica	2018–19	Serbian SuperLiga	18	1	2	0	—		6	0	—		26	1
Spartak Subotica	2020–21	Serbian SuperLiga	34	5	2	1	—		—		—		36	6
Spartak Subotica	2021–22	Serbian SuperLiga	30	0	1	0	—		—		—		31	0
Spartak Subotica	2022–23	Serbian SuperLiga	31	2	1	0	—		—		—		32	2
Spartak Subotica	Total		147	11	7	1	0	0	6	0	—		160	12
Port	2023–24	Thai League 1	20	3	1	0	3	1	1 (Note: Appearance in AFC Champions League Elite)	0	—		25	4
Port	2024–25	Thai League 1	24	4	0	0	2	0	4 (Note: Appearances in AFC Champions League Two)	1	—		30	5
Port	2025–26	Thai League 1	16	3	0	0	1	0	—		3 (Note: Appearances in Piala Presiden)	0	20	3
Total			60	10	1	0	6	1	5	1	3	0	75	12
Career total			279	23	20	2	6	1	11	1	3	0	319	27

== Honours ==
=== Club ===
Sutjeska Nikšić

- Montenegrin Cup: 2016–17

Port

- Thai League Cup: 2025–26
- Piala Presiden: 2025
