= Barros Tardeli =

Brazilian footballer (born 1990)

Tardeli
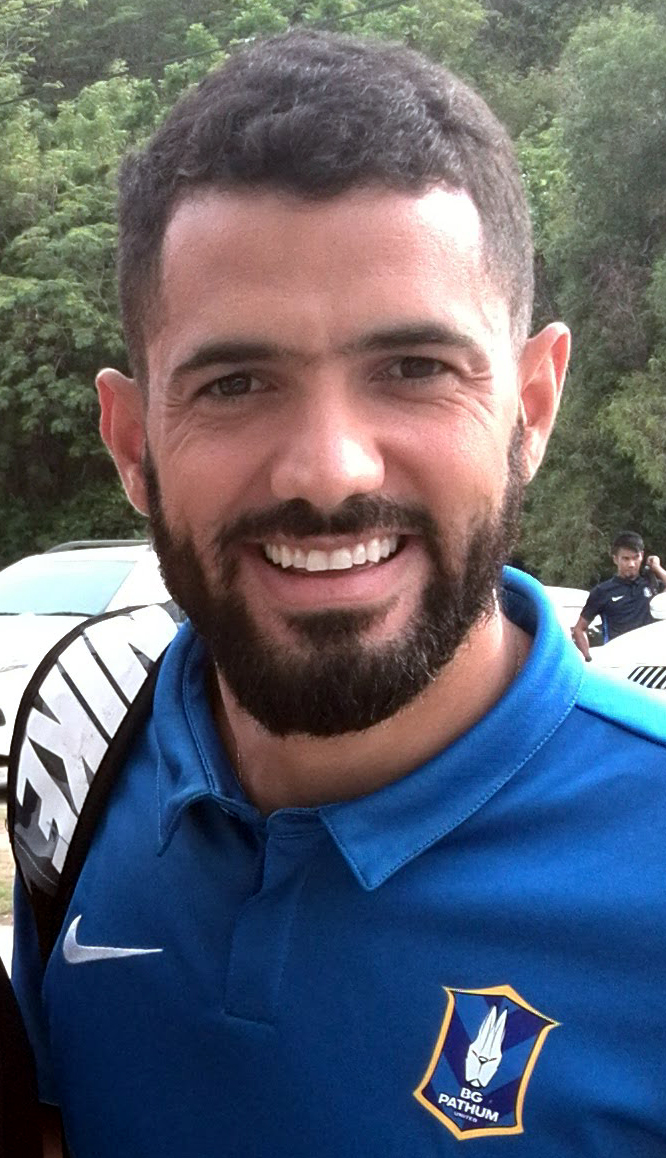
- Tardeli in 2019

Personal information
- Full name: Tardeli Barros Machado Reis
- Date of birth: 2 March 1990 (age 36)
- Place of birth: Visconde do Rio Branco, Brazil
- Height: 1.85 m (6 ft 1 in)
- Positions: Forward; winger

Team information
- Current team: Aymorés

Senior career*
Years	Team	Apps	(Gls)
2012	Bahia	0	(0)
2015	Samutsongkhram		
2016	Krabi		
2017–2018	Trat		(39)
2018–2021	BG Pathum United	29	(18)
2020–2021	→ Samut Prakan City (loan)	24	(25)
2021	Suwon FC	6	(1)
2022–2023	Nongbua Pitchaya	42	(17)
2023	Port	28	(12)
2024	PT Prachuap	13	(3)
2025	Port	9	(0)
2026–	Aymorés	0	(0)
- * Club domestic league appearances and goals as of 18 June 2026

Tardeli Barros Machado Reis (born 2 March 1990), simply known as Tardeli, is a Brazilian professional footballer who plays as a forward or a winger for Aymorés.

== Honours ==
Individual

- Thai League 1 Top Scorer: 2020–21
- Thai League 1 Best XI: 2020–21
- Thai League 2 Top Scorer: 2018
