= Janepob Phokhi =

Thai footballer

Personal information
- Full name: Janepob Phokhi
- Date of birth: 4 April 1996 (age 30)
- Place of birth: Suphan Buri, Thailand
- Height: 1.70 m (5 ft 7 in)
- Positions: Winger; forward

Team information
- Current team: Trat
- Number: 10

Youth career
- 2012–2015: Suphanburi

Senior career*
Years	Team	Apps	(Gls)
2016–2019	Suphanburi	8	(0)
2016	→ Lampang (loan)	10	(1)
2018	→ Ubon UMT United (loan)	0	(0)
2020	Trat	2	(0)
2020	Samut Sakhon	3	(0)
2020	Lamphun Warrior	6	(0)
2021	Police Tero	15	(6)
2022–2024	Port	5	(0)
2022–2023	→ Police Tero (loan)	28	(0)
2024	Police Tero	3	(1)
2025–	Trat	16	(0)

International career^{‡}
2014	Thailand U19	1	(0)
2016–2017	Thailand U21	3	(0)
2017	Thailand U23	1	(0)
2021	Thailand	1	(0)
Medal record
Thailand
Asean Football Championship
Winner	AFF Suzuki Cup 2020	2020
- * Club domestic league appearances and goals as of 26 April 2025 ‡ National team caps and goals as of 13 May 2023

Janepob Phokhi (Thai: เจนภพ โพธิ์ขี, born 4 April 1996) is a Thai professional footballer who plays as a winger or a forward for Thai League 2 club Trat.

== Club career ==
Phokhi scored 6 goals in 15 matches for Police Tero in the season 2021 and transferred to Port FC for the season 2022.

== International career ==
In 2021, he was called up by Thailand national team for the 2020 AFF Championship, which they won.

== Honours ==
=== Club ===
Lamphun Warrior

- Thai League 3 (1): 2020–21

=== International ===
Thailand

- AFF Championship (1): 2020
