= Nakin Wisetchat =

Thai footballer (born 1999)

Personal information
- Full name: Nakin Wisetchat
- Date of birth: 9 July 1999 (age 27)
- Place of birth: Ayutthaya, Thailand
- Height: 1.73 m (5 ft 8 in)
- Position: Right back

Youth career
- 2011–2015: Assumption College Thonburi

Senior career*
Years	Team	Apps	(Gls)
2016	Ayutthaya Warrior	9	(0)
2017–2018	Ayutthaya	20	(0)
2019–2021	Bangkok United	0	(0)
2019	→ Army United (loan)	31	(2)
2020	→ Ayutthaya United (loan)	2	(0)
2020	→ Chainat Hornbill (loan)	12	(0)
2021–2023	BG Pathum United	10	(0)
2023–2025	Port	0	(0)
2024	→ Chiangmai (loan)	7	(0)
2024–2025	→ Nakhon Pathom United (loan)	2	(0)
2025	Customs United	10	(0)
2026	Mahasarakham SBT	3	(0)

International career^{‡}
2017	Thailand U19	5	(0)
2018–2022	Thailand U23	13	(0)
Medal record
Thailand under-19
AFF U-19 Youth Championship
Winner	AFF U-18 Youth Championship 2017	Football
Thailand under-23
Southeast Asian Games
Silver medal – second place	Sea Games 2021	Football
- * Club domestic league appearances and goals as of 30 April 2025 ‡ National team caps and goals as of 22 May 2022

Nakin Wisetchat (Thai: นาคิน วิเศษชาติ, born 9 July 1999) is a Thai professional footballer who plays as a right back.

== Career ==
=== Army United ===
He was loaned from Bangkok United to Army United in 2019, where he was voted the best player of the season by fans after 2 goals and 5 assists in 31 matches.

=== Ayutthaha United ===
He remains with Bangkok united but has been loaned to Thai League 2 club Ayutthaya United.

=== International career ===
He was called up for the 2018 AFC U-19 Championship qualification in November 2017. In March 2019, he was called up to play in the 2020 AFC U-23 Championship qualification. This was followed by being called up to the January 2020 AFC U-23 Championship (the AFC qualifiers for the 2020 Olympics).

== Honour ==
=== Club ===
BG Pathum United

- Thailand Champions Cup (1): 2022

=== International ===
Thailand U-19

- 2017 AFF U-19 Youth Championship: Champion

Thailand U-23

- 2021 Southeast Asian Games: (silver) Silver medal
