= Chalermsak Aukkee =

Thai footballer

Personal information
- Full name: Chalermsak Aukkee
- Date of birth: 25 August 1994 (age 32)
- Place of birth: Buriram, Thailand
- Height: 1.86 m (6 ft 1 in)
- Position: Centre back

Team information
- Current team: Burapha United
- Number: 23

Youth career
- 2009–2010: Muensri Wittayanusorn School
- 2011–2013: Buriram United

Senior career*
| Years | Team | Apps | (Gls) |
| 2014 | Buriram United | 0 | (0) |
| 2014 | → Phichit (loan) | 16 | (0) |
| 2015 | BCC | 19 | (0) |
| 2016–2017 | Ubon UMT United | 25 | (2) |
| 2017–2020 | BG Pathum United | 49 | (2) |
| 2020 | → Chiangmai (loan) | 10 | (0) |
| 2020 | → Rajpracha (loan) | 13 | (1) |
| 2021–2023 | Police Tero | 66 | (3) |
| 2023–2025 | Port | 39 | (2) |
| 2025– | Burapha United | 20 | (2) |

International career^{‡}
| 2022–2025 | Thailand | 13 | (2) |
Medal record
Thailand
Asean Football Championship
| Winner | Mitsubishi Electric Cup 2022 | Team |
| Runner-up | Mitsubishi Electric Cup 2024 | Team |
- * Club domestic league appearances and goals as of 9 March 2026 ‡ National team caps and goals as of 2 January 2025

Chalermsak Aukkee (Thai: เฉลิมศักดิ์ อักขี; born 25 August 1994) is a Thai professional footballer who plays as a centre back for Thai League 3 club Burapha United.

== International career ==
In October 2022, Chalermsak was called up by Thailand national team for friendly matches against Nepal and Suriname. He was also part of the 2022 AFF Championship squad that won the tournament.

In October 2024, he was selected in the 2024 King's Cup squad where they won the cup. In November, Chalermsak was selected in the Thailand squad for the 2024 ASEAN Championship. On 20 December, he scored his first international goal against Cambodia at the Rajamangala National Stadium.

=== International goals ===
Scores and results list Thailand's goal tally first.

| No | Date | Venue | Opponent | Score | Result | Competition |
|---|---|---|---|---|---|---|
| 1. | 20 December 2024 | Rajamangala National Stadium, Bangkok, Thailand | Cambodia | 3–1 | 3–2 | 2024 ASEAN Championship |
| 2. | 2 January 2025 | Việt Trì Stadium, Việt Trì, Vietnam | Vietnam | 1–2 | 1–2 | 2024 ASEAN Championship |

== Honours ==
BG Pathum United

- Thai League 2: 2019

Thailand

- AFF Championship: 2022
- King's Cup: 2024
