= Negueba =

Brazilian footballer

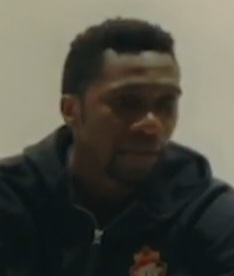

Personal information
- Full name: Guilherme Ferreira Pinto
- Date of birth: 7 April 1992 (age 34)
- Place of birth: Rio de Janeiro, Brazil
- Height: 1.77 m (5 ft 9 1/2 in)
- Positions: Winger; attacking midfielder

Team information
- Current team: Chonburi
- Number: 10

Youth career
- 2001–2011: Flamengo

Senior career*
Years	Team	Apps	(Gls)
2010–2014	Flamengo	45	(0)
2013	→ São Paulo (loan)	5	(0)
2015–2016	Coritiba	28	(3)
2016	Grêmio	11	(1)
2017	Atlético Goianiense	11	(0)
2017	Ponte Preta	4	(0)
2017	→ Londrina (loan)	14	(2)
2018–2019	Gyeongnam	47	(6)
2020	Gyeongnam	19	(2)
2021	Incheon United	31	(2)
2022	Criciúma	6	(0)
2022–2024	Port	28	(3)
2024–2025	Lamphun Warriors	34	(6)
2025–2026	Ratchaburi	28	(1)
2026–	Chonburi	0	(0)

International career
2011	Brazil U20	7	(0)
- * Club domestic league appearances and goals as of 1 September 2026

Guilherme Ferreira Pinto (born 7 April 1992), commonly known as Negueba, is a Brazilian footballer who plays as a winger or an attacking midfielder for Thai League 1 club Chonburi.

== Career ==
=== Youth ===
Negueba came very young to Flamengo as a futsal player. The young midfielder had brief passages in Jacarepaguá Tênis Clube and the Jequiá da Ilha before reaching Flamengo's youth team as a prospect for the future.

=== Professional ===
The young Negueba went through all the categories of the youth divisions of Flamengo, and got his first opportunity at the professional team in 2010, with Vanderlei Luxemburgo as the team manager. At that time, Negueba, who was only 18 years old incomplete, won a vote of confidence not only of the veteran manager, but the entire squad represented by team captain Leonardo Moura.

On November 7, 2010, he had his début, starting in a 0–1 loss against Atlético Paranaense in a Brazilian Série A match at Estádio Raulino de Oliveira.

After the end of 2010 Brazilian Série A, Flamengo announced Negueba had his contract renewed for another 5 years.

After consecutive poor matches and repeated mistakes, Negueba lost prestige with the squad. After a loss to Santos, arguably caused by two individual errors by Negueba, the player was not included in any further match day squad of the team. Negueba protested a possible move to Avaí FC, proposed by the club's managers, but accepted a move to another club. On September 20, 2012, São Paulo confirmed Negueba as a member of its 2013 squad. As part of the loan deal, Cléber Santana went in exchange to Flamengo. Negueba had previously refused a move to Lisbon's Sporting, as he was seen as an important part of the squad by Joel Santana, and also as being too young for an international move.

On January 5, 2013, one day after his presentation in São Paulo, Negueba went through surgery due to a knee injury. He remained sidelined for six months. On September 1, almost eight months after his arrival to the club, Negueba finally made his debut for São Paulo FC, coming from the bench at 82 minutes in a 0–0 draw against Botafogo, for the Brazilian Série A. According to the winger, "it was a happy moment. I could début for São Paulo, at Maracanã Stadium, where greats already played, and I felt good." Two days later, Negueba made his second game wearing the shirt of Tricolor Paulista, this time in a 1–0 victory against Náutico, again coming from the bench in the second half. Applauded by the fans, Negueba praised them, saying: "I am going to do my best to help the team."

However, two months before the end of his contract with São Paulo, Negueba, not being a part of Muricy Ramalho's plans, was dismissed by the club, returning to Flamengo.

On the June 6, 2016 it was involved In a change changes player Edinho, in the which Negueba will act for Grêmio.

== Career statistics ==
As of match played 22 September 2023

Club	Season	League			State League		Cup		League Cup		Continental		Other		Total	
Club	Season	Division	Apps	Goals	Apps	Goals	Apps	Goals	Apps	Goals	Apps	Goals	Apps	Goals	Apps	Goals
Flamengo	2010	Série A	3	0	—		—		—		—		—		3	0
Flamengo	2011	Série A	18	0	7	1	3	1	—		2	0	—		30	2
Flamengo	2012	Série A	13	0	12	1	—		—		5	0	—		30	1
Flamengo	2014	Série A	11	0	10	2	—		—		2	0	—		23	2
Flamengo	Total		45	0	29	4	3	1	0	0	9	0	0	0	86	5
São Paulo (loan)	2013	Série A	5	0	—		—		—		—		—		5	0
Coritiba	2015	Série A	24	2	11	0	6	0	—		—		—		41	2
Coritiba	2016	Série A	4	1	16	0	2	0	—		—		—		22	1
Coritiba	Total		28	3	27	0	8	0	0	0	0	0	0	0	63	3
Grêmio	2016	Série A	11	1	—		—		—		—		—		11	1
Atlético Goianiense	2017	Série A	0	0	11	0	0	0	—		—		—		11	0
Ponte Preta	2017	Série A	4	0	—		—		—		1	0	—		5	0
Londrina (loan)	2017	Série B	13	2	—		—		—		—		1	0	14	2
Gyeongnam FC	2018	K League 1	36	5	—		1	0	—		—		—		37	5
Gyeongnam FC	2019	K League 1	11	0	—		2	0	—		6	0	—		19	0
Gyeongnam FC	Total		47	5	0	0	3	0	0	0	6	0	0	0	56	5
Gyeongnam FC	2020	K League 2	19	2	—		1	0	—		—		—		20	2
Incheon United	2021	K League 1	31	2	—		0	0	—		—		—		31	2
Criciúma	2022	Série B	6	0	—		—		—		—		—		6	0
Port	2022–23	Thai League 1	24	3	—		5	2	1	0	—		—		30	5
Port	2023–24	Thai League 1	4	0	—		0	0	0	0	1	0	—		5	0
Port	Total		28	3	0	0	5	2	1	0	1	0	0	0	35	5
Lamphum Warriors	2023–24	Thai League 1	4	2	—		0	0	0	0	0	0	—		4	2
Career total			241	20	67	4	20	3	2	0	17	0	1	0	347	27

== Honours ==
=== Club ===
Flamengo

- Copa São Paulo de Futebol Júnior: 2011
- Campeonato Carioca: 2011, 2014
- Taça Rio: 2011
- Taça Guanabara: 2011, 2014

Grêmio

Copa do Brasil: 2016

Londrina

- Primeira Liga: 2017

=== International ===
Brazil U20

- FIFA U-20 World Cup: 2011
