= Chayapipat Supunpasuch =

Thai footballer (born 2001)

Personal information
- Full name: Chayapipat Supunpasuch
- Date of birth: 25 February 2001 (age 25)
- Place of birth: Lopburi, Thailand
- Height: 1.76 m (5 ft 9 in)
- Position: Defensive midfielder

Team information
- Current team: Kanchanaburi Power
- Number: 88

Youth career
- 2013–2015: Bangkok Christian College
- 2015–2019: Braga
- 2019–2021: Estoril

Senior career*
Years	Team	Apps	(Gls)
2021–2022	Estoril B	24	(4)
2022–2023	Praiense	17	(0)
2023–2025	Port	4	(0)
2026–	Kanchanaburi Power	11	(2)

International career^{‡}
2022–2023	Thailand U23	12	(0)
Medal record
Men's football
Representing Thailand
SEA Games
Silver medal – second place	Hanoi 2021	Team
- * Club domestic league appearances and goals as of 00:45, 15 June 2026 (UTC) ‡ National team caps and goals as of 30 April 2023

Chayapipat Supunpasuch (Thai: ชยพิพัฒน์ สุพรรณเภสัช, born 25 February 2001) is a Thai professional footballer who plays as a defensive midfielder for Thai League 1 club Kanchanaburi Power.

== International career ==
On 26 May 2022, Supunpasuch was called up to the Thailand under-23 for the 2022 AFC U-23 Asian Cup.

== Honours ==
=== Club ===
Estoril Praia U23

- Liga Revelação U23: 2020–21

==== Port ====
- Piala Presiden: 2025

=== International ===
Thailand U23

- Southeast Asian Games (silver) Silver medal (2): 2021, 2023

=== Individual ===
Estoril B

- 3a divisao a.f. lisboa Player of the Year: 2021–22
