= Felipe Amorim =

Brazilian footballer (born 1991)

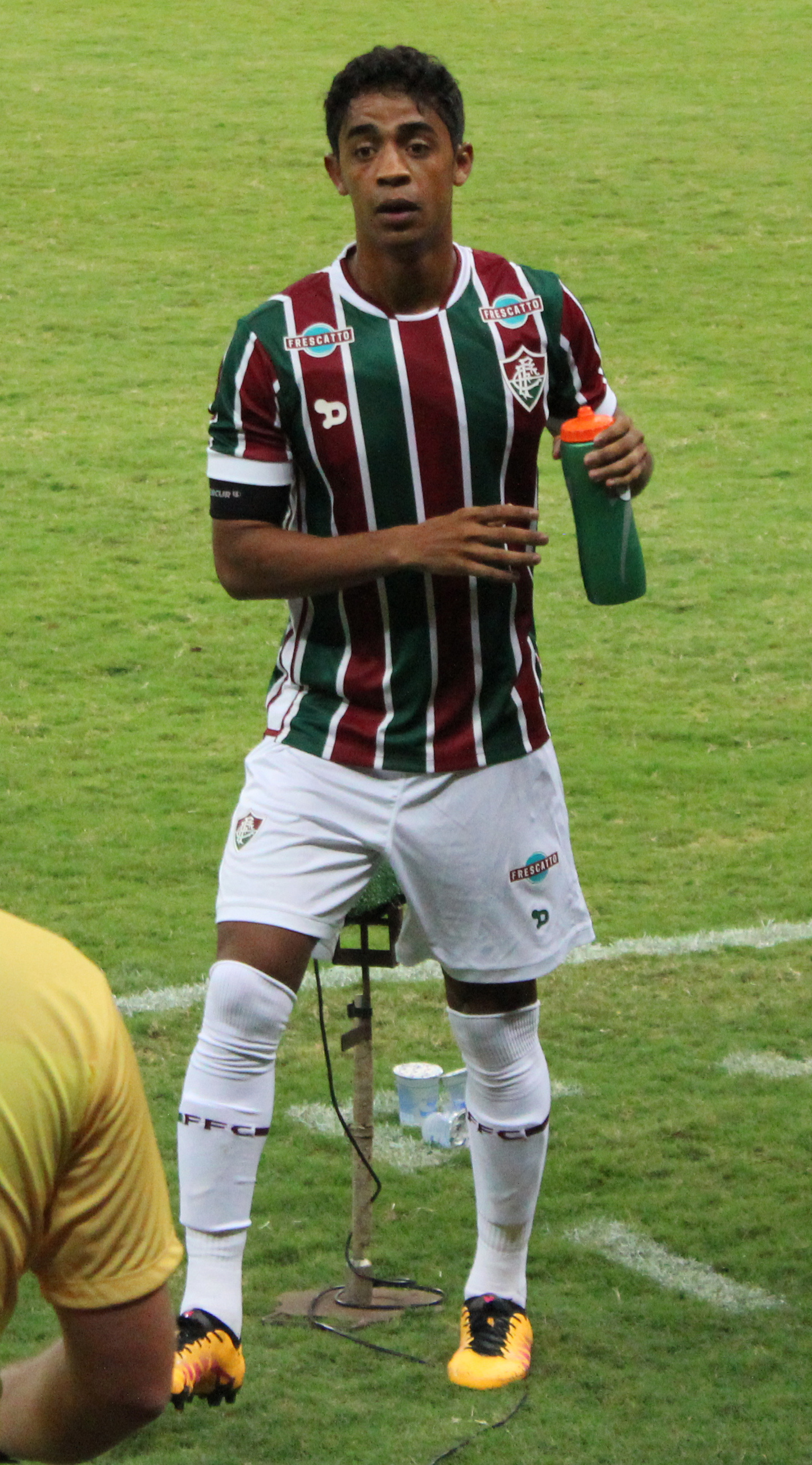
- Amorim with Fluminense in 2016

Personal information
- Full name: Felipe da Silva Amorim
- Date of birth: 4 January 1991 (age 35)
- Place of birth: Brasília, Brazil
- Height: 1.76 m (5 ft 9 in)
- Position: Forward

Team information
- Current team: Khon Kaen United
- Number: 7

Youth career
- Goiás

Senior career*
| Years | Team | Apps | (Gls) |
| 2010–2014 | Goiás | 54 | (9) |
| 2013 | → Paraná (loan) | 18 | (1) |
| 2014 | → Ceará (loan) | 17 | (0) |
| 2015 | América Mineiro | 26 | (3) |
| 2016–2019 | Fluminense | 0 | (0) |
| 2016 | → Coritiba (loan) | 10 | (0) |
| 2017 | → América Mineiro (loan) | 13 | (0) |
| 2018 | → Figueirense (loan) | 23 | (2) |
| 2019 | → Guarani (loan) | 12 | (1) |
| 2020 | Suphanburi | 15 | (0) |
| 2021–2023 | Chiangrai United | 64 | (12) |
| 2023 | Hyderabad | 6 | (0) |
| 2024–2025 | Port | 23 | (10) |
| 2025– | Khon Kaen United | 0 | (0) |
- * Club domestic league appearances and goals as of 30 April 2025

Felipe da Silva Amorim (born 4 January 1991), commonly known as Felipe Amorim, is a Brazilian professional footballer who most recently played as a forward for Thai club Khon Kaen United in the Thai League 2.

== Honours ==
Chiangrai United

- Thai FA Cup: 2020–21
