= Jaturapat Sattham =

Thai footballer

Personal information
- Full name: Jaturapat Sattham
- Date of birth: 15 June 1999 (age 27)
- Place of birth: Khon Kaen, Thailand
- Height: 1.75 m (5 ft 9 in)
- Position: Left-back

Team information
- Current team: Chonburi

Youth career
- 2013–2016: Osotspa

Senior career*
| Years | Team | Apps | (Gls) |
| 2017–2018 | BCC Tero | 34 | (2) |
| 2018–2019 | Chainat Hornbill | 27 | (3) |
| 2018 | → Ubon United (loan) | 6 | (1) |
| 2020–2024 | Port | 31 | (1) |
| 2020 | → Samut Prakan City (loan) | 0 | (0) |
| 2022–2023 | → Nakhon Ratchasima (loan) | 26 | (1) |
| 2024– | Muangthong United | 22 | (1) |
| 2025–2026 | → Rayong (loan) | 11 | (0) |
| 2026– | → Chonburi (loan) | 0 | (0) |

International career
| 2016–2019 | Thailand U19 | 6 | (0) |
| 2019–2020 | Thailand U21 | 3 | (0) |
| 2019–2022 | Thailand U23 | 9 | (0) |
| 2021 | Thailand | 1 | (0) |
Medal record
Thailand under-23
SEA Games
| Silver medal – second place | Vietnam 2021 | Team |
- * Club domestic league appearances and goals as of 00:42, 17 June 2026 (UTC)

Jaturapat Sattham (Thai: จตุรพัช สัทธรรม; born 15 June 1999) is a Thai professional footballer who plays as a left-back at Chonburi and the Thailand national team.

== International career ==
On 12 April 2021, He was named in manager Akira Nishino's 47-man squad for Thailand's 2022 World Cup qualification he play the friendly matches against Tajikistan.

== Honour ==
=== International ===
Thailand U-19

- 2017 AFF U-19 Youth Championship: Champion

Thailand U-23

- Southeast Asian Games (silver) Silver medal: 2021
