= Chinnawat Wongchai =

Thai footballer (born 1996)

Personal information
- Full name: Chinnawat Wongchai
- Date of birth: 8 December 1996 (age 29)
- Place of birth: Chiang Rai, Thailand
- Height: 1.80 m (5 ft 11 in)
- Position: Centre-back

Team information
- Current team: Port
- Number: 16

Youth career
- 2014–2016: Assumption College

Senior career*
Years	Team	Apps	(Gls)
2017–2019	PTT Rayong	24	(0)
2020–2023	Buriram United	0	(0)
2020–2021	→ Rayong (loan)	19	(0)
2021–2023	→ PT Prachuap (loan)	35	(0)
2023–	Port	12	(1)
- * Club domestic league appearances and goals as of 9 February 2025

Chinnawat Wongchai (Thai: ชินวัฒน์ วงศ์ไชย, born 8 December 1996) is a Thai professional footballer who plays as a centre-back for Thai League 1 club Port.

== Honours ==
Port

- Thai League Cup: 2025–26
- Piala Presiden: 2025
