= Teerasak Poeiphimai =

Thai footballer

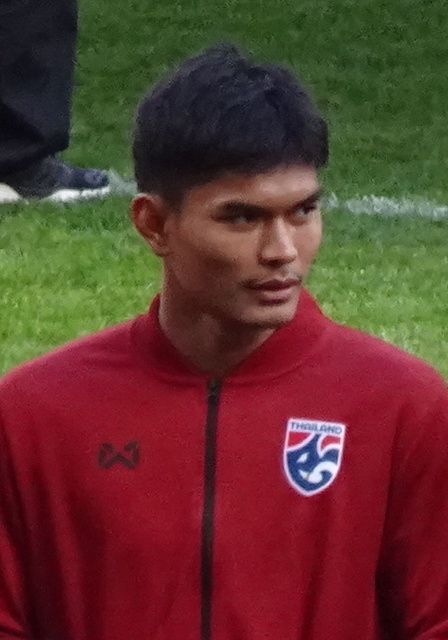
- Teerasak in 2024

Personal information
- Full name: Teerasak Poeiphimai
- Date of birth: 21 September 2002 (age 24)
- Place of birth: Nakhon Ratchasima, Thailand
- Height: 1.80 m (5 ft 11 in)
- Position: Striker

Team information
- Current team: Port
- Number: 14

Youth career
- 2018–2020: Surasakmontree School

Senior career*
Years	Team	Apps	(Gls)
2020–2021	Prime Bangkok	32	(13)
2021–	Port	104	(42)

International career^{‡}
2023	Thailand U22	6	(4)
2022–2024	Thailand U23	22	(6)
2022–	Thailand	38	(15)
Medal record
Men's football
Representing Thailand
FIFA ASEAN Cup
Runner-up	Indonesia 2026	Team
ASEAN Championship
Runner-up	ASEAN 2024	Team
Runner-up	ASEAN 2026	Team
SEA Games
Silver medal – second place	Vietnam 2021	Team
Silver medal – second place	Cambodia 2023	Team
- * Club domestic league appearances and goals as of 20 September 2026 ‡ National team caps and goals as of 17 November 2026

Teerasak Poeiphimai (Thai: ธีรศักดิ์ เผยพิมาย, born 21 September 2002) is a Thai professional footballer who plays as a striker for Thai League 1 club Port and the Thailand national team.

== International career ==
On 15 October 2021, Teerasak was called up to the Thailand U23 national team for the 2022 AFC U-23 Asian Cup qualification. In February 2022, Teerasak represented Thailand U23 at the 2022 AFF U-23 Youth Championship in Cambodia. He scored his first international goal on 16 February 2022 against Singapore.

== Career statistics ==
As of match played 10 January 2026

Appearances and goals by club, season and competition
Club	Season	League			Domestic Cup		League Cup		Continental		Other		Total	
Club	Season	Division	Apps	Goals	Apps	Goals	Apps	Goals	Apps	Goals	Apps	Goals	Apps	Goals
Port	2021–22	Thai League 1	7	1	0	0	1	0	1 (Note: Appearance in AFC Champions League)	0	—		9	1
Port	2022–23	Thai League 1	23	8	5	3	1	0	—		—		29	11
Port	2023–24	Thai League 1	22	15	1	0	4	0	—		—		27	15
Port	2024–25	Thai League 1	21	10	1	0	2	0	7 (Note: Appearances in AFC Champions League Two)	0	—		31	10
Port	2025–26	Thai League 1	28	7	2	2	1	1	—		3 (Note: Appearances in Piala Presiden)	1	21	9
Total			88	39	8	4	8	0	8	0	3	1	114	46
Career total			88	39	8	4	8	0	8	0	3	1	114	46

=== International goals ===
#	Date	Venue	Opponent	Score	Result	Competition
1.	8 December 2024	Hàng Đẫy Stadium, Hanoi, Vietnam	Timor-Leste	8–0	10–0	2024 ASEAN Championship
2.	8 December 2024	Hàng Đẫy Stadium, Hanoi, Vietnam	Timor-Leste	9–0	10–0	2024 ASEAN Championship
3.	17 December 2024	National Stadium, Kallang, Singapore	Singapore	4–2	4–2	2024 ASEAN Championship
4.	4 September 2025	Kanchanaburi Province Stadium, Kanchanaburi, Thailand	Fiji	1–0	3–0	2025 King's Cup
5.	14 October 2025	Taipei Municipal Stadium, Taipei, Taiwan	Chinese Taipei	1–0	6–1	2027 AFC Asian Cup qualification
6.	14 October 2025	Taipei Municipal Stadium, Taipei, Taiwan	Chinese Taipei	4–1	6–1	2027 AFC Asian Cup qualification
7.	14 October 2025	Taipei Municipal Stadium, Taipei, Taiwan	Chinese Taipei	5–1	6–1	2027 AFC Asian Cup qualification
8.	25 July 2026	New Laos National Stadium, Vientiane, Laos	Laos	1–0	5–0	2026 ASEAN Championship
9.	1 August 2026	Rajamangala Stadium, Bangkok, Thailand	Malaysia	2–0	2–0	2026 ASEAN Championship
10.	15 August 2026	Jalan Besar Stadium, Kallang, Singapore	Singapore	1–0	3–1	2026 ASEAN Championship
11.	15 August 2026	Jalan Besar Stadium, Kallang, Singapore	Singapore	2–0	3–1	2026 ASEAN Championship
12.	26 September 2026	Si Jalak Harupat Stadium, Bandung, Indonesia	Pakistan	1–0	4–0	2026 FIFA ASEAN Cup
13.	26 September 2026	Si Jalak Harupat Stadium, Bandung, Indonesia	Pakistan	4–0	4–0	2026 FIFA ASEAN Cup
14.	17 November 2026	Sisaket Province Stadium, Sisaket, Thailand	Tajikistan	2–0	3–0	2026 King's Cup
15.	17 November 2026	Sisaket Province Stadium, Sisaket, Thailand	Tajikistan	3–0	3–0	2026 King's Cup

== Honours ==
=== Club ===
Port

- Thai League Cup: 2025–26
- Piala Presiden: 2025

=== International ===
Thailand U-23

- AFF U-23 Championship runner-up: 2022
- SEA Games (silver) Silver Medal (2): 2021, 2023

Thailand

- FIFA ASEAN Cup runner-up: 2026
- King's Cup: 2026

=== Individual ===
- AFF U-23 Championship Top Scorer: 2022
- AFF U-23 Championship Team of the Tournament: 2022
