= Indonesia national football team results (2020–present) =

This article provides details of international football games played by the Indonesia national football team from 2020 to present.

== Results ==
Key
Win
Draw
Defeat

=== 2021 ===
25 May Friendly	Indonesia	2–3	Afghanistan	Dubai, United Arab Emirates
20:00 UTC+4	Egy 59'; Alis 64'	Report	N. Amiri 7'; Sharifi 44'; Zamani 52'	Stadium: Jebel Ali Centre of Excellence

29 May Friendly	Indonesia	1–3	Oman	Dubai, United Arab Emirates
19:00 UTC+4	Evan 51'	Report	Al-Ghassani 40'; Al-Hajri 77', 88'	Stadium: The Sevens Stadium

3 June 2022 World Cup qualification R2	Thailand	2–2	Indonesia	Dubai, United Arab Emirates
20:45 UTC+4	Narubadin 5'; Kraisorn 50'	Report (FIFA); Report (AFC)	Kadek 39'; Evan 60'	Stadium: Al Maktoum Stadium; Attendance: 0 Referee: Ammar Mahfoodh (Bahrain)

7 June 2022 World Cup qualification R2	Vietnam	4–0	Indonesia	Dubai, United Arab Emirates
20:45 UTC+4	Nguyễn Tiến Linh 51'; Nguyễn Quang Hải 62'; Nguyễn Công Phượng 67'; Vũ Văn Thanh 74'	Report (FIFA); Report (AFC)		Stadium: Al Maktoum Stadium; Attendance: 225; Referee: Ahmed Al-Ali (Jordan)

11 June 2022 World Cup qualification R2	Indonesia	0–5	United Arab Emirates	Dubai, United Arab Emirates
20:45 UTC+4		Report (FIFA); Report (AFC)	Mabkhout 22', 49' (pen.); Lima 28', 55'; Tagliabúe 86'	Stadium: Zabeel Stadium; Attendance: 963; Referee: Mohammed Al-Hoish (Saudi Arabia)

7 October 2023 Asian Cup qualification	Indonesia	2–1	Chinese Taipei	Buriram, Thailand
19:00 UTC+7	Rumakiek 16'; Evan 48'	Report	Hsu Heng-pin 90'	Stadium: Buriram Stadium; Attendance: 0 Referee: Payam Heidari (Iran)

11 October 2023 Asian Cup qualification	Chinese Taipei	0–3	Indonesia	Buriram, Thailand
20:00 UTC+7		Report	Egy 26'; Kambuaya 55'; Witan 90+3'	Stadium: Buriram Stadium; Attendance: 0 Referee: Mohammad Arafah (Jordan)

16 November Friendly	Afghanistan	1–0	Indonesia	Antalya, Turkey
17:00 UTC+3	Popalzay 85'	Report		Stadium: Gloria Sports Arena

25 November Friendly	Indonesia	4–1	Myanmar	Antalya, Turkey
17:30 UTC+3	Kambuaya 5'; Irfan 12'; Witan 33'; Ezra 55' (pen.)	Report	H. Bo Bo 73'	Stadium: Emirhan Sports Complex

9 December 2020 AFF Championship	Indonesia	4–2	Cambodia	Bishan, Singapore
20:30 UTC+8	irianto 5', 33'; Evan 17'; Rumakiek 54'	Report (AFFSZ); Report (AFF)	Safy 37'; Mony Udom 60'	Stadium: Bishan Stadium; Referee: Yaqoob Abdul Baki (Oman)

12 December 2020 AFF Championship	Laos	1–5	Indonesia	Bishan, Singapore
17:30 UTC+8	Kydavone 41'	Report (AFFSZ); Report (AFF)	Asnawi 23' (pen.); Irfan 34'; Witan 56'; Ezra 77'; Evan 84'	Stadium: Bishan Stadium; Attendance: 207; Referee: Kim Hee-gon (South Korea)

15 December 2020 AFF Championship	Indonesia	0–0	Vietnam	Bishan, Singapore
20:30 UTC+8		Report (AFFSZ); Report (AFF)		Stadium: Bishan Stadium; Attendance: 928; Referee: Kim Dae-yong (South Korea)

19 December 2020 AFF Championship	Malaysia	1–4	Indonesia	Kallang, Singapore
20:30 UTC+8	Raj 13'	Report (AFFSZ); Report (AFF)	Irfan 36', 43'; Arhan 50'; Baggott 82'	Stadium: National Stadium; Attendance: 7,082; Referee: Ammar Ebrahim Mahfoodh (Bahrain)

22 December 2020 AFF Championship SF	Singapore	1–1	Indonesia	Kallang, Singapore
20:30 UTC+8	Ikhsan 70'	Report (AFFSZ); Report (AFF)	Witan 28'	Stadium: National Stadium; Attendance: 9,952; Referee: Kim Hee-gon (South Korea)

25 December 2020 AFF Championship SF	Indonesia	4–2 (a.e.t.)	Singapore	Kallang, Singapore
20:30 UTC+8	Ezra 11'; Arhan 87'; Shawal 91' (o.g.); Egy 105+2'	Report (AFFSZ); Report (AFF)	Song Ui-young 45+4'; Shahdan 74'	Stadium: National Stadium; Attendance: 9,982; Referee: Qasim Al-Hatmi (Oman)

29 December 2020 AFF Championship Final	Indonesia	0–4	Thailand	Kallang, Singapore
20:30 UTC+8		Report (AFFSZ); Report (AFF)	Songkrasin 2', 52'; Sarachat 67'; Phala 83'	Stadium: National Stadium; Attendance: 6,290; Referee: Shukri Al-Alhunfush (Saudi Arabia)

=== 2022 ===
1 January 2020 AFF Championship Final	Thailand	2–2	Indonesia	Kallang, Singapore
20:30 UTC+8	Kraisorn 54'; Yooyen 56'	Report (AFFSZ); Report (AFF)	Kambuaya 7'; Egy 80'	Stadium: National Stadium; Attendance: 7,429; Referee: Ahmed Faisal Al-Ali (Jordan)

27 January Friendly	Indonesia	4–1	Timor-Leste	Gianyar, Indonesia
20:00 UTC+8	Kambuaya 54'; Arhan 73' (pen.); Mendonca 77' (o.g.); Filomeno 80' (o.g.)	Report	Freitas 35'	Stadium: Kapten I Wayan Dipta Stadium; Referee: Sance Lawita (Indonesia)

30 January Friendly	Timor-Leste	0–3	Indonesia	Gianyar, Indonesia
20:00 UTC+8		Report	Puhiri 5'; Rumakiek 41'; Kambuaya 72'	Stadium: Kapten I Wayan Dipta Stadium; Referee: Aprisman Aranda (Indonesia)

1 June Friendly	Indonesia	0–0	Bangladesh	Soreang, Indonesia
20:30 UTC+7		Report		Stadium: Jalak Harupat Stadium; Attendance: 8,615; Referee: Yudi Nurcahya (Indonesia)

8 June 2023 Asian Cup qualification	Kuwait	1–2	Indonesia	Kuwait City, Kuwait
19:15 UTC+3	Nasser 41'	Report	Klok 44' (pen.); Irianto 46'	Stadium: Jaber Al-Ahmad International Stadium; Attendance: 6,100; Referee: Nasrullo Kabirov (Tajikistan)

11 June 2023 Asian Cup qualification	Indonesia	0–1	Jordan	Kuwait City, Kuwait
22:15 UTC+3		Report	Al-Naimat 48'	Stadium: Jaber Al-Ahmad International Stadium; Attendance: 2,410; Referee: Yaqoob Abdul Baki (Oman)

14 June 2023 Asian Cup qualification	Indonesia	7–0	Nepal	Kuwait City, Kuwait
22:15 UTC+3	Dimas 6'; Witan 43', 81'; Fachruddin 54'; Saddil 55'; Baggott 80'; Marselino 90'	Report		Stadium: Jaber Al-Ahmad International Stadium; Attendance: 3,145; Referee: Hussein Abo Yehia (Lebanon)

24 September Friendly	Indonesia	3–2	Curaçao	Bandung, Indonesia
20:00 UTC+7	Klok 18'; Fachruddin 22'; Dimas 56'	Report	Janga 8'; J. Bacuna 25'	Stadium: Gelora Bandung Lautan Api Stadium; Attendance: 7,095; Referee: Abdul Hakim Mohd Haidi (Brunei)

27 September Friendly	Curaçao	1–2	Indonesia	Cibinong, Indonesia
20:00 UTC+7	Antonisse 47'	Report	Dimas 3'; Dendy 87'	Stadium: Pakansari Stadium; Attendance: 21,819; Referee: Xaypaseuth Pongsanit (Laos)

23 December 2022 AFF Championship	Indonesia	2–1	Cambodia	Jakarta, Indonesia
16:30 UTC+7	Egy 7'; Witan 35'	Report (AFFMEC); Report (AFF)	Krya 16'	Stadium: Gelora Bung Karno Stadium; Attendance: 25,332; Referee: Ryuji Sato (Japan)

26 December 2022 AFF Championship	Brunei	0–7	Indonesia	Kuala Lumpur, Malaysia
18:00 UTC+8		Report (AFFMEC); Report (AFF)	Abimanyu 20'; Dendy 41'; Egy 59'; Spasojević 61'; Sananta 69'; Klok 86'; Yakob S. 90+2'	Stadium: Kuala Lumpur Stadium; Attendance: 5,439; Referee: Kim Hee-gon (South Korea)

29 December 2022 AFF Championship	Indonesia	1–1	Thailand	Jakarta, Indonesia
16:30 UTC+7	Klok 50' (pen.)	Report (AFFMEC); Report (AFF)	Yooyen 79'	Stadium: Gelora Bung Karno Stadium; Attendance: 49,985; Referee: Mohammed Al Hoish (Saudi Arabia)

=== 2023 ===
2 January 2022 AFF Championship	Philippines	1–2	Indonesia	Manila, Philippines
20:30 UTC+8	Rasmussen 83'	Report (AFFMEC); Report (AFF)	Dendy 21'; Marselino 43'	Stadium: Rizal Memorial Stadium; Attendance: 2,370; Referee: Ahmed Faisal Al Ali (Jordan)

6 January 2022 AFF Championship SF	Indonesia	0–0	Vietnam	Jakarta, Indonesia
16:30 UTC+7		Report (AFFMEC); Report (AFF)		Stadium: Gelora Bung Karno Stadium; Attendance: 49,595; Referee: Omar Al-Yaqoubi (Oman)

9 January 2022 AFF Championship SF	Vietnam	2–0	Indonesia	Hanoi, Vietnam
19:30 UTC+7	Nguyễn Tiến Linh 3', 47'	Report (AFFMEC); Report (AFF)		Stadium: Mỹ Đình National Stadium; Attendance: 37,675; Referee: Yusuke Araki (Japan)

25 March Friendly	Indonesia	3–1	Burundi	Bekasi, Indonesia
20:30 UTC+7	Yakob S. 6'; Dendy 14'; Ridho 44'	Report	Niyongabire 51'	Stadium: Patriot Candrabhaga Stadium; Attendance: 4,448; Referee: Razlan Joffri Ali (Malaysia)

28 March Friendly	Burundi	2–2	Indonesia	Bekasi, Indonesia
20:30 UTC+7	Berahino 80'; Bigirimana 90'	Report	Witan 61'; Amat 90+4'	Stadium: Patriot Candrabhaga Stadium; Attendance: 2,018; Referee: Razlan Joffri Ali (Malaysia)

14 June Friendly	Indonesia	0–0	Palestine	Surabaya, Indonesia
19:30 UTC+7		Report		Stadium: Gelora Bung Tomo Stadium; Attendance: 32,537; Referee: Muhammad Usaid Jamal (Malaysia)

19 June Friendly	Indonesia	0–2	Argentina	Jakarta, Indonesia
19:30 UTC+7		Report	Paredes 38'; Romero 55'	Stadium: Gelora Bung Karno Stadium; Attendance: 56,060; Referee: Muhammad Usaid Jamal (Malaysia)

8 September Friendly	Indonesia	2–0	Turkmenistan	Surabaya, Indonesia
19:30 UTC+7	Dendy 19'; Egy 90+1'	Report		Stadium: Gelora Bung Tomo Stadium; Attendance: 13,814; Referee: Muhammad Usaid Jamal (Malaysia)

12 October 2026 World Cup qualification R1	Indonesia	6–0	Brunei	Jakarta, Indonesia
19:00 UTC+7	Dimas 7', 72', 90+2'; Ridho 12'; Sananta 63' (pen.), 67'	Report		Stadium: Gelora Bung Karno Stadium; Attendance: 23,318; Referee: Bijan Heydari (Iran)

17 October 2026 World Cup qualification R1	Brunei	0–6	Indonesia	Bandar Seri Begawan, Brunei
20:15 UTC+7		Report	Hokky 6', 44'; Egy 42'; Witan 47' (pen.); Ridho 63'; Sananta 81'	Stadium: Hassanal Bolkiah National Stadium; Attendance: 17,281; Referee: Ahmed Faisal Al-Ali (Jordan)

16 November 2026 World Cup qualification R2	Iraq	5–1	Indonesia	Basra, Iraq
17:45 UTC+3	Resan 20'; Amat 35' (o.g.); Rashid 60'; Amyn 81'; Al-Hamadi 88'	Report	Pattynama 45+3'	Stadium: Basra International Stadium; Attendance: 64,447; Referee: Ahmed Eisa (United Arab Emirates)

21 November 2026 World Cup qualification R2	Philippines	1–1	Indonesia	Manila, Philippines
19:00 UTC+8	Reichelt 23'	Report	Saddil 70'	Stadium: Rizal Memorial Stadium; Attendance: 9,880; Referee: Kim Jong-hyeok (South Korea)
Note: The home match of Indonesia against the Philippines is to be swapped with the away match because it coincides with the 2023 FIFA U-17 World Cup schedule. The change was confirmed on 31 October 2023 by FIFA.

=== 2024 ===
5 January Friendly	Indonesia	1–2	Libya	Aksu, Turkey
16:00 UTC+3	Yakob S. 6'	Report	Al-Shuraimi 9'; Krawa'a 20'	Stadium: Mardan Sports Complex; Referee: Kadir Sağlam (Turkey)

15 January 2023 AFC Asian Cup GS	Indonesia	1–3	Iraq	Al Rayyan, Qatar
17:30 UTC+3	Marselino 37'	Report	M. Ali 17'; Rashid 45+7'; Hussein 75'	Stadium: Ahmad bin Ali Stadium; Attendance: 16,532; Referee: Ilgiz Tantashev (Uzbekistan)

19 January 2023 AFC Asian Cup GS	Vietnam	0–1	Indonesia	Doha, Qatar
17:30 UTC+3		Report	Asnawi 42' (pen.)	Stadium: Abdullah bin Khalifa Stadium; Attendance: 7,253; Referee: Sadullo Gulmurodi (Tajikistan)

24 January 2023 AFC Asian Cup GS	Japan	3–1	Indonesia	Doha, Qatar
14:30 UTC+3	Ueda 6' (pen.), 52'; Hubner 88' (o.g.)	Report	Walsh 90+1'	Stadium: Al Thumama Stadium; Attendance: 26,453; Referee: Khamis Al-Marri (Qatar)

28 January 2023 AFC Asian Cup R16	Australia	4–0	Indonesia	Al Rayyan, Qatar
14:30 UTC+3	Baggott 12' (o.g.); Boyle 45'; Goodwin 89'; Souttar 90+1'	Report		Stadium: Jassim bin Hamad Stadium; Attendance: 7,863; Referee: Mohammed Abdulla Hassan Mohamed (United Arab Emirates)

21 March 2026 World Cup qualification R2	Indonesia	1–0	Vietnam	Jakarta, Indonesia
20:30 UTC+7	Egy 52'	Report		Stadium: Gelora Bung Karno Stadium; Attendance: 57,696; Referee: Salman Falahi (Qatar)

26 March 2026 World Cup qualification R2	Vietnam	0–3	Indonesia	Hanoi, Vietnam
19:00 UTC+7		Report	Idzes 9'; Oratmangoen 23'; Sananta 90+8'	Stadium: Mỹ Đình National Stadium; Attendance: 27,832; Referee: Alireza Faghani (Australia)

6 June 2026 World Cup qualification R2	Indonesia	0–2	Iraq	Jakarta, Indonesia
16:00 UTC+7		Report	Hussein 54' (pen.); Jasim 88'	Stadium: Gelora Bung Karno Stadium; Attendance: 60,245; Referee: Shaun Evans (Australia)

11 June 2026 World Cup qualification R2	Indonesia	2–0	Philippines	Jakarta, Indonesia
19:30 UTC+7	Haye 32'; Ridho 55'	Report		Stadium: Gelora Bung Karno Stadium; Attendance: 64,942; Referee: Rustam Lutfullin (Uzbekistan)

5 September 2026 World Cup qualification R3	Saudi Arabia	1–1	Indonesia	Jeddah, Saudi Arabia
21:00 UTC+3	Al-Juwayr 45+3'	Report	Walsh 19'	Stadium: King Abdullah Sports City Stadium; Attendance: 42,385; Referee: Adham Mohammad Tumah Makhadmeh (Jordan)

10 September 2026 World Cup qualification R3	Indonesia	0–0	Australia	Jakarta, Indonesia
19:00 UTC+7		Report		Stadium: Gelora Bung Karno Stadium; Attendance: 70,059; Referee: Salman Falahi (Qatar)

10 October 2026 World Cup qualification R3	Bahrain	2–2	Indonesia	Riffa, Bahrain
19:00 UTC+3	Marhoon 15', 90+9'	Report	Oratmangoen 45+3'; Struick 74'	Stadium: Bahrain National Stadium; Attendance: 10,731; Referee: Ahmed Al-Kaf (Oman)

15 October 2026 World Cup qualification R3	China	2–1	Indonesia	Qingdao, China
20:00 UTC+8	Behram 21'; Zhang Yuning 44'	Report	Haye 86'	Stadium: Qingdao Youth Football Stadium; Attendance: 37,133; Referee: Omar Al-Ali (United Arab Emirates)

15 November 2026 World Cup qualification R3	Indonesia	0–4	Japan	Jakarta, Indonesia
19:00 UTC+7		Report	Hubner 35' (o.g.); Minamino 40'; Morita 49'; Sugawara 69'	Stadium: Gelora Bung Karno Stadium; Attendance: 60,304; Referee: Mooud Bonyadifard (Iran)

19 November 2026 World Cup qualification R3	Indonesia	2–0	Saudi Arabia	Jakarta, Indonesia
19:00 UTC+7	Marselino 32', 57'	Report		Stadium: Gelora Bung Karno Stadium; Attendance: 55,970; Referee: Rustam Lutfullin (Uzbekistan)

9 December 2024 ASEAN Championship	Myanmar	0–1	Indonesia	Yangon, Myanmar
19:00 UTC+6:30		Report	Zin Nyi Nyi Aung 77' (o.g.)	Stadium: Thuwunna Stadium; Attendance: 12,500; Referee: Wong Wai Lun (Hong Kong)

12 December 2024 ASEAN Championship	Indonesia	3–3	Laos	Surakarta, Indonesia
20:00 UTC+7	Kadek 12'; Ferarri 18', 72'	Report	Panyavong 9'; Phommathep 13'; Phanthavong 77'	Stadium: Manahan Stadium; Attendance: 14,455; Referee: Hiroki Kasahara (Japan)

15 December 2024 ASEAN Championship	Vietnam	1–0	Indonesia	Việt Trì, Vietnam
20:00 UTC+7	Nguyễn Quang Hải 77'	Report		Stadium: Việt Trì Stadium; Attendance: 16,669; Referee: Abdullah Dhafer Al-Shehri (Saudi Arabia)

21 December 2024 ASEAN Championship	Indonesia	0–1	Philippines	Surakarta, Indonesia
20:00 UTC+7		Report	Kristensen 63' (pen.)	Stadium: Manahan Stadium; Attendance: 17,390; Referee: Koji Takasaki (Japan)

=== 2025 ===
20 March 2026 World Cup qualification R3	Australia	5–1	Indonesia	Sydney, Australia
20:10 UTC+11	Boyle 18' (pen.); Velupillay 20'; Irvine 34', 90'; Miller 61'	Report	Romeny 78'	Stadium: Sydney Football Stadium; Attendance: 35,241; Referee: Adham Makhadmeh (Jordan)

25 March 2026 World Cup qualification R3	Indonesia	1–0	Bahrain	Jakarta, Indonesia
20:45 UTC+7	Romeny 24'	Report		Stadium: Gelora Bung Karno Stadium; Attendance: 69,599; Referee: Sadullo Gulmurodi (Tajikistan)

5 June 2026 World Cup qualification R3	Indonesia	1–0	China	Jakarta, Indonesia
20:45 UTC+7	Romeny 45' (pen.)	Report		Stadium: Gelora Bung Karno Stadium; Attendance: 69,661; Referee: Rustam Lutfullin (Uzbekistan)

10 June 2026 World Cup qualification R3	Japan	6–0	Indonesia	Suita, Japan
19:35 UTC+9	Kamada 15', 45+6'; Kubo 19'; Morishita 55'; Machino 58'; Hosoya 80'	Report		Stadium: Suita City Football Stadium; Attendance: 33,661; Referee: Kim Jong-hyeok (South Korea)

5 September Friendly	Indonesia	6–0	Chinese Taipei	Surabaya, Indonesia
20:30 UTC+7	Amat 4'; Chao Ming-hsiu 23' (o.g.); Klok 33'; Reijnders 38'; Sananta 58'; Walsh 60'	Report		Stadium: Gelora Bung Tomo Stadium; Attendance: 24,272; Referee: Ryo Tanimoto (Japan)

8 September Friendly	Indonesia	0–0	Lebanon	Surabaya, Indonesia
20:30 UTC+7		Report		Stadium: Gelora Bung Tomo Stadium; Attendance: 27,052; Referee: Ko Hyung-jin (South Korea)

8 October 2026 World Cup qualification R4	Indonesia	2–3	Saudi Arabia	Jeddah, Saudi Arabia
20:15 UTC+3	Diks 11' (pen.), 88' (pen.)	Report	Al-Shamat 17'; Al-Buraikan 36' (pen.), 62'	Stadium: King Abdullah Sports City Stadium; Attendance: 40,634; Referee: Ahmed Al-Ali (Kuwait)

11 October 2026 World Cup qualification R4	Iraq	1–0	Indonesia	Jeddah, Saudi Arabia
22:30 UTC+3	Iqbal 76'	Report		Stadium: King Abdullah Sports City Stadium; Attendance: 14,687; Referee: Ma Ning (China)

=== 2026 ===
27 March 2026 FIFA Series	Indonesia	4–0	Saint Kitts and Nevis	Jakarta, Indonesia
20:00 UTC+7	Putra 15', 25'; Romeny 53'; Zijlstra 75'	Report		Stadium: Gelora Bung Karno Stadium; Attendance: 26,703; Referee: Muhammad Taqi (Singapore)

30 March 2026 FIFA Series	Indonesia	0–1	Bulgaria	Jakarta, Indonesia
20:00 UTC+7		Report	M. Petkov 38' (pen.)	Stadium: Gelora Bung Karno Stadium; Attendance: 24,174; Referee: Nazmi Nasaruddin (Malaysia)

5 June Garuda Championship Series	Indonesia	3–0	Oman	Jakarta, Indonesia
20:00 UTC+7	Hubner 13'; Romeny 27'; Oratmangoen 55'	Report		Stadium: Gelora Bung Karno Stadium; Attendance: 23,677; Referee: Muhammad Taqi (Singapore)

9 June Garuda Championship Series	Indonesia	1–0	Mozambique	Jakarta, Indonesia
20:00 UTC+7	Romeny 12'	Report		Stadium: Gelora Bung Karno Stadium; Attendance: 29,889; Referee: Muhammad Taqi (Singapore)

27 July 2026 ASEAN Championship	Indonesia	5–1	Cambodia	Bogor, Indonesia
20:30 UTC+7	Baker 6', 15', 56'; Walsh 24'; Raven 86'	Report	Nadeo 48' (o.g.)	Stadium: Pakansari Stadium; Attendance: 22,485; Referee: Kim Woo-Sung (South Korea)

31 July 2026 ASEAN Championship	Timor-Leste	0–3	Indonesia	Chonburi, Thailand
17:00 UTC+7		Report	Pattynama 74'; Haye 78'; Baker 81'	Stadium: Chonburi Stadium; Attendance: 189; Referee: Choi Hyun-jai (South Korea)

3 August 2026 ASEAN Championship	Indonesia	0–3	Vietnam	Bogor, Indonesia
20:30 UTC+7		Report	Nguyễn Văn Vĩ 6'; Nguyễn Hai Long 14'; Rafaelson 71'	Stadium: Pakansari Stadium; Attendance: 27,265; Referee: Tim Danaskos (Australia)

7 August 2026 ASEAN Championship	Singapore	1–1	Indonesia	Kallang, Singapore
21:00 UTC+8	Ilhan 66'	Report	Oratmangoen 47'	Stadium: Jalan Besar Stadium; Attendance: 5,113; Referee: Abdullah Salim Khalfan Al-Amouri (Oman)

25 September 2026 FIFA ASEAN Cup	Indonesia	2–0	Singapore	Jakarta, Indonesia
20:00 UTC+7	Oratmangoen 13'; Romeny 74' (pen.)	Report		Stadium: Gelora Bung Karno Stadium; Attendance: 38,702; Referee: Rustam Lutfullin (Uzbekistan)

28 September 2026 FIFA ASEAN Cup	Malaysia	0–0	Indonesia	Jakarta, Indonesia
19:30 UTC+7		Report		Stadium: Gelora Bung Karno Stadium; Attendance: 56,894; Referee: Ko Hyung-jin (South Korea)

1 October 2026 FIFA ASEAN Cup	Indonesia	9–2	Bangladesh	Jakarta, Indonesia
19:30 UTC+7	Baker 11', 20', 37', 42', 90+7'; Ridho 32'; Hubner 45+1'; Vickery 90'; Diks 90+6'	Report	Emon 36'; Wahid 90+1'	Stadium: Gelora Bung Karno Stadium; Attendance: 33,595; Referee: Nasrullo Kabirov (Tajikistan)

5 October 2026 FIFA ASEAN Cup	Indonesia	2–2 (a.e.t.) (4–2 p)	Thailand	Jakarta, Indonesia
20:00 UTC+7	James 84'; Baggott 116'	Report	Iklas 87'; Peeradol 111'	Stadium: Gelora Bung Karno Stadium; Attendance: 70,098; Referee: Akhrol Riskullaev (Uzbekistan)
	Penalties
	Diks (penalty scored); James (penalty scored); Baggott (penalty scored); Pattynama (penalty scored)		(penalty scored) Bihr; (penalty scored) Waris; (penalty missed) Sarach; (penalty missed) Nattapong

13 November Friendly	Jordan	Cancelled	Indonesia	Amman, Jordan
TBD		Report		Stadium: Amman International Stadium
Note: On 5 November, the Jordan Football Association announced the match agaisnt Indonesia had been cancelled by the requst from Indonesia amit the ongoing Houthi–Saudi conflict in the region.

=== 2027 ===
11 January 2027 AFC Asian Cup	Japan	v	Indonesia	Jeddah, Saudi Arabia
--:-- UTC+3				Stadium: Prince Abdullah Al-Faisal Sports City Stadium

16 January 2027 AFC Asian Cup	Indonesia	v	Qatar	Al Khobar, Saudi Arabia
--:-- UTC+3				Stadium: Aramco Stadium

20 January 2027 AFC Asian Cup	Thailand	v	Indonesia	Jeddah, Saudi Arabia
--:-- UTC+3				Stadium: King Abdullah Sports City Stadium
