= Philippines national football team results (2020–present) =

Philippines did not play any friendlies in 2020 due to the COVID-19 pandemic. On February 19, 2021, FIFA and AFC confirmed the dates for the remaining matches of the World Cup qualifiers held in June. The team was supposed to play a friendly against India in Qatar as part of the preparation for the qualifiers, but it was cancelled.

== 2021 ==
June 7 2022 FIFA World Cup qualification	China	2–0	Philippines	Sharjah, United Arab Emirates
21:00 (UTC+4)	Wu Lei 56' (pen.); Wu Xinghan 65'	Report (FIFA); Report (AFC)		Stadium: Sharjah Stadium; Referee: Kim Hee-gon (South Korea)

June 11 2022 FIFA World Cup qualification	Philippines	3–0	Guam	Sharjah, United Arab Emirates
18:00 (UTC+4)	Guirado 12'; Lopez 60' (o.g.); Hartmann 88'	Report (FIFA); Report (AFC)		Stadium: Sharjah Stadium; Referee: Ammar Aljeneibi (United Arab Emirates)

June 15 2022 FIFA World Cup qualification	Philippines	1–1	Maldives	Sharjah, United Arab Emirates
19:00 (UTC+4)	Guirado 19'	Report (FIFA); Report (AFC)	Fasir 25'	Stadium: Sharjah Stadium; Referee: Sivakorn Pu-udom (Thailand)

December 8 2020 AFF Championship GS	Philippines	1–2	Singapore	Kallang, Singapore
20:30 (UTC+8)	Nazari 69'	Report (AFFSZ); Report (AFF)	Hariss 61'; Ramli 63'	Stadium: National Stadium; Attendance: 8,922; Referee: Kim Dae-yong (South Korea)

December 11 2020 AFF Championship GS	Timor-Leste	0–7	Philippines	Kallang, Singapore
17:30 (UTC+8)		Report (AFFSZ); Report (AFF)	Steuble 21'; Nazari 31'; Guirado 35'; Reichelt 40'; Nyholm 45'; Marañón 45+1'; Ingreso 78'	Stadium: National Stadium; Attendance: 420; Referee: Nazmi Nasaruddin (Malaysia)

December 14 2020 AFF Championship GS	Philippines	1–2	Thailand	Kallang, Singapore
17:30 (UTC+8)	Reichelt 57'	Report (AFFSZ); Report (AFF)	Teerasil 26', 78' (pen.)	Stadium: National Stadium; Attendance: 2,559; Referee: Qasim Al-Hatmi (Oman)

December 18 2020 AFF Championship GS	Myanmar	2–3	Philippines	Bishan, Singapore
20:30 (UTC+8)	Htet Phyo Wai 74', 86'	Report (AFFSZ); Report (AFF)	Marañón 16', 19', 45'	Stadium: Bishan Stadium; Attendance: 215; Referee: Mohammed Al-Hoaish (Saudi Arabia)

== 2022 ==
March 23 2022 FAS Tri-Nations Series	Philippines	0–2	Malaysia	Kallang, Singapore
20:00 UTC+8			Akhyar 3', 24'	Stadium: National Stadium; Referee: Ahmad A'qashah

March 29 2022 FAS Tri-Nations Series	Singapore	2–0	Philippines	Kallang, Singapore
20:00 UTC+8	Safuwan 10'; Shawal 90'			Stadium: National Stadium; Referee: Ahmad A'qashah

June 8 2023 AFC Asian Cup qualification	Philippines	0–0	Yemen	Ulaanbaatar, Mongolia
12:30 UTC+8		Report		Stadium: MFF Football Centre; Attendance: 25; Referee: Kim Dae-yong (South Korea)

June 11 2023 AFC Asian Cup qualification	Mongolia	0–1	Philippines	Ulaanbaatar, Mongolia
12:30 UTC+8		Report	Holtmann 90+3'	Stadium: MFF Football Centre; Attendance: 1,287; Referee: Chen Hsin-chuan (Chinese Taipei)

June 14 2023 AFC Asian Cup qualification	Palestine	4–0	Philippines	Ulaanbaatar, Mongolia
12:30 UTC+8	Chihadeh 31'; Seyam 42'; Yameen 55'; Abu Warda 72'	Report		Stadium: MFF Football Centre; Attendance: 92; Referee: Mooud Bonyadifar (Iran)

July 16 Friendly	Philippines	4–1	Timor-Leste	Bali, Indonesia
	Mi. Ott 23'; Menzi 45'; Bedic 51', 90+2'			Stadium: Kapten I Wayan Dipta Stadium; Referee: Sance Lawita (Indonesia)

December 14 Friendly	Vietnam	1–0	Philippines	Hanoi, Vietnam
19:00 UTC+8	Nguyễn Văn Quyết 90+2'			Stadium: Hàng Đẫy Stadium

December 20 2022 AFF Championship GS	Cambodia	3–2	Philippines	Phnom Penh, Cambodia
18:00 UTC+8	Bunheing 16', 59'; Chanpolin 20'	Report (AFFME); Report (AFF)	Daniels 41', 55'	Stadium: Morodok Techo National Stadium; Attendance: 4,860; Referee: Majed Al Shamrani (Saudi Arabia)

December 23 2022 AFF Championship GS	Philippines	5–1	Brunei	Manila, Philippines
18:00 UTC+8	Daniels 7'; Reyes 12'; Melliza 50'; Rasmussen 52', 88'	Report (AFF)	Ramlli 70'	Stadium: Rizal Memorial Stadium; Attendance: 1,650; Referee: Tam Ping Wun (Hong Kong)

December 26 2022 AFF Championship GS	Thailand	4–0	Philippines	Pathum Thani, Thailand
20:30 UTC+8	Teerasil 3', 41' (pen.); Adisak 58'; Suphanan 63'	Report (AFF)		Stadium: Thammasat Stadium; Attendance: 6,567; Referee: Yudai Yamamoto (Japan)

== 2023 ==
January 2 2022 AFF Championship GS	Philippines	1–2	Indonesia	Manila, Philippines
20:30 UTC+8	Rasmussen 83'	Report (AFFMEC)	Dendy 21'; Marselino 43'	Stadium: Rizal Memorial Stadium; Referee: Ahmed Faisal Al Ali (Jordan)

March 24 Friendly	Kuwait	2–0	Philippines	Kuwait City, Kuwait
22:00 UTC+3	Al-Fadhel 71'; Khalaf 84'	Report		Stadium: Jaber Al-Ahmad International Stadium; Referee: Shukri Hussein Al Hunfush (Saudi Arabia)

March 28 Friendly	Jordan	4–0	Philippines	Doha, Qatar
21:30 UTC+3	Tamari 10' (pen.), 26'; Naimat 56'; Olwan 58'

June 15 Friendly	Philippines	1–0	Nepal	Manila, Philippines
19:00 UTC+8	Gayoso 49'			Stadium: Rizal Memorial Stadium; Attendance: 3,200

June 19 Friendly	Philippines	2–3	Chinese Taipei	Manila, Philippines
19:00 UTC+8	Mi. Ott 12' (pen.); Reichelt 39'		Wu Yen-shu 2'; Yu Yao-hsing 57'; Lin Ming-wei 90'	Stadium: Rizal Memorial Stadium; Attendance: 3,758; Referee: Lê Vũ Linh (Vietnam)

September 8 Friendly	Chinese Taipei	1–1	Philippines	Kaohsiung, Taiwan
19:00 UTC+8	Shao-Yu Pai 90+4'		Reichelt 18'	Stadium: Kaohsiung National Stadium; Referee: Lê Vũ Linh (Vietnam)

September 12 Friendly	Philippines	2–1	Afghanistan	Manila, Philippines
19:00 UTC+8	Rasmussen 74'; Rontini 81'		Popalzay 64'	Stadium: Rizal Memorial Stadium; Attendance: 2,137

October 17 Friendly	Bahrain	1–0	Philippines	Arad, Bahrain
19:00 UTC+3	Al-Khatal 16'			Stadium: Al Muharraq Stadium

November 16 2026 FIFA World Cup qualification	Philippines	0–2	Vietnam	Manila, Philippines
19:00 UTC+8		Report	Nguyễn Văn Toàn 16' Nguyễn Đình Bắc 90+4'	Stadium: Rizal Memorial Stadium; Attendance: 10,378; Referee: Rustam Lutfullin (Uzbekistan)

November 21 2026 FIFA World Cup qualification	Philippines	1–1	Indonesia	Manila, Philippines
19:00 UTC+8	Reichelt 23'	Report	Saddil 70'	Stadium: Rizal Memorial Stadium; Attendance: 9,880; Referee: Kim Jong-hyeok (South Korea)

== 2024 ==
March 21 2026 World Cup qualification	Iraq	1–0	Philippines	Basra, Iraq
22:00 UTC+3	Ali 84'	Report (AFC)		Stadium: Basra International Stadium; Attendance: 63,750; Referee: Abdullah Jamali (Kuwait)

March 26 2026 World Cup qualification	Philippines	0–5	Iraq	Manila, Philippines
19:00 UTC+8		Report (FIFA); Report (AFC)	Hussein 14' (pen.), 36'; Al-Ammari 30'; Iqbal 62'; Tahseen 77'	Stadium: Rizal Memorial Stadium; Attendance: 10,014; Referee: Nazmi Nasaruddin (Malaysia)

June 6 2026 World Cup qualification	Vietnam	3–2	Philippines	Hanoi, Vietnam
19:00 UTC+7	Nguyễn Tiến Linh 65', 76'; Phạm Tuấn Hải 90+5'	Report (FIFA); Report (AFC)	Reichelt 62'; Ingreso 89'	Stadium: Mỹ Đình National Stadium; Referee: Hanna Hattab (Syria)

June 11 2026 World Cup qualification	Indonesia	2–0	Philippines	Jakarta, Indonesia
19:30 UTC+7	Haye 31'; Ridho 56'	(FIFA) (AFC)		Stadium: Gelora Bung Karno Stadium; Attendance: 64,942; Referee: Rustam Lutfullin (Uzbekistan)

September 4 2024 Merdeka Tournament SF	Philippines	1–2	Malaysia	Kuala Lumpur, Malaysia
21:00 UTC+8	Tabinas 27'	Report	Syamer 43'; Safawi 73' (pen.)	Stadium: Bukit Jalil National Stadium; Attendance: 3,658; Referee: Yudi Nurcahya (Indonesia)

September 8 2024 Merdeka Tournament Third place	Philippines	0–0 (3–4 p)	Tajikistan	Kuala Lumpur, Malaysia
16:30 UTC+8				Stadium: Bukit Jalil National Stadium; Referee: Razlan Joffri Ali (Malaysia)
	Penalties
	J. Tabinas (penalty missed); Gayoso (penalty missed); P. Tabinas (penalty scored); Monis (penalty scored); Rontini (penalty scored)		(penalty scored) Nazarov; (penalty missed) Umarbayev; (penalty scored) Sharipov; (penalty scored) Safarov; (penalty scored) Shukurov

October 11 2024 King's Cup SF	Thailand	3–1	Philippines	Songkhla, Thailand
20:00 UTC+7	Chanathip 53'; Suphanat 68', 87'		Kristensen 63'	Stadium: Tinsulanon Stadium; Attendance: 24,000

October 14 2024 King's Cup Third place	Tajikistan	0–3	Philippines	Songkhla, Thailand
16:30 UTC+7			Holtmann 47'; J. Tabinas 58'; Bailey 62'	Stadium: Tinsulanon Stadium

November 14 Friendly	Hong Kong	3–1	Philippines	So Kon Po, Hong Kong
20:00 UTC+8	Orr 45', 90+5'; Everton 83'		Kristensen 48'	Stadium: Hong Kong Stadium; Attendance: 4,966; Referee: Warintorn Sassadee (Thailand)

December 12 2024 ASEAN Championship	Philippines	1–1	Myanmar	Manila, Philippines
18:30 UTC+8	Kristensen 72' (pen.)	Report	Maung Maung Lwin 25'	Stadium: Rizal Memorial Stadium; Attendance: 1,589; Referee: Kim Dae-yong (South Korea)

December 15 2024 ASEAN Championship	Laos	1–1	Philippines	Vientiane, Laos
17:30 UTC+7	Mi. Baldisimo 34' (o.g.)	Report	Reyes 77'	Stadium: New Laos National Stadium; Attendance: 6,389; Referee: Ryo Tanimoto (Japan)

December 18 2024 ASEAN Championship	Philippines	1–1	Vietnam	Manila, Philippines
21:00 UTC+8	Gayoso 68'	Report	Doãn Ngọc Tân 90+7'	Stadium: Rizal Memorial Stadium; Attendance: 3,346; Referee: Akobirxuja Shukurullaev (Uzbekistan)

December 21 2024 ASEAN Championship	Indonesia	0–1	Philippines	Surakarta, Indonesia
20:00 UTC+7		Report	Kristensen 63' (pen.)	Stadium: Manahan Stadium; Attendance: 17,390; Referee: Koji Takasaki (Japan)

December 27 2024 ASEAN Championship SF Leg 1	Philippines	2–1	Thailand	Manila, Philippines
21:00 UTC+8	Reyes 21'; Linares 90+5'	Report	Suphanan 45'	Stadium: Rizal Memorial Stadium; Attendance: 10,087; Referee: Kim Dae-yong (South Korea)

December 30 2024 ASEAN Championship SF Leg 2	Thailand	3–1 (a.e.t.) (4–3 agg.)	Philippines	Bangkok, Thailand
20:00 UTC+7	Peeraldol 37'; Gustavsson 54'; Suphanat 116'	Report	Kristensen 84'	Stadium: Rajamangala Stadium; Attendance: 31,876; Referee: Kimura Hiroyuki (Japan)

== 2025 ==
March 25 2027 AFC Asian Cup qualification	Philippines	4–1	Maldives	Capas, Philippines
19:00 UTC+8	J. Tabinas 6'; Kristensen 19'; Schneider 77'; Reyes 90+2'	Report (AFC)	Fasir 62'	Stadium: New Clark City Athletics Stadium; Attendance: 3,334; Referee: Daniel Elder (Australia)

June 10 2027 AFC Asian Cup qualification	Philippines	2–2	Tajikistan	Capas, Philippines
20:00 UTC+8	Kristensen 28', 79'	Report (AFC)	Mabatshoyev 30'; Umarbayev 42' (pen.)	Stadium: New Clark City Athletics Stadium; Attendance: 10,854; Referee: Hasan Akrami (Iran)

October 9 2027 AFC Asian Cup qualification	Timor-Leste	1–4	Philippines	Darwin, Australia
19:00 UTC+9:30	Freitas 47'	Report (AFC)	Kristensen 15', 31', 49', 56'	Stadium: Territory Rugby League Stadium; Attendance: 1,356; Referee: Yudi Nurcahya (Indonesia)

October 14 2027 AFC Asian Cup qualification	Philippines	3–1	Timor-Leste	Capas, Philippines
20:00 UTC+8	J. Tabinas 46'; Kristensen 70'; Gayoso 90+1'	Report; Report (AFC)	Rangel 45+1'	Stadium: New Clark City Athletics Stadium; Attendance: 10,034; Referee: Torphong Somsing (Thailand)

November 18 2027 AFC Asian Cup qualification	Maldives	0–2	Philippines	Malé, Maldives
15:30 UTC+5:30		Report; Report (AFC)	J. Tabinas 24'; S. Reyes 37'	Stadium: National Football Stadium; Attendance: 1,591; Referee: Ahmed Khalil (Bahrain)

== 2026 ==
March 31 2027 AFC Asian Cup qualification	Tajikistan	1–1	Philippines	Hisor, Tajikistan
19:00 UTC+5	Boboev 40'	Report (AFC)	Obermair 19'	Stadium: Hisor Central Stadium; Attendance: 15,200; Referee: Hiroki Kasahara (Japan)

June 3 Friendly	Philippines	5–1	Guam	Manila, Philippines
19:30 UTC+8	Mrowka 5'; Gayoso 18'; Rublico 44'; Leipold 64', 90+2'	Report (FIFA)	Berg 60'	Stadium: Rizal Memorial Stadium; Attendance: 2,243; Referee: Songkran Bunmeekiart (Thailand)

June 9 Friendly	Philippines	5–1	Myanmar	Manila, Philippines
19:30 UTC+8	J. Tabinas 45+1'; P. Tabinas 54'; Rasmussen 80', 90+1'; Leipold 88'		Win Naing Tun 82'	Stadium: Rizal Memorial Stadium; Attendance: 4,662

July 28 2026 ASEAN Championship Group B	Philippines	1–4	Myanmar	Capas, Philippines
18:00 UTC+8	Gayoso 68'		Kyaw Min Oo 45+1'; Than Paing 28', 83'; Win Naing Tun 81'	Stadium: New Clark City Athletics Stadium

Aug 1 2026 ASEAN Championship Group B	Laos	1–4	Philippines	Vientiane, Laos
17:00 UTC+7	Damoth 7'	Report	Lucero 47'; Viengxay 52' (o.g.); Gayoso 60' (pen.); Sato 88'	Stadium: Laos National Stadium; Referee: Kim Hee-gon (South Korea)

August 4 2026 ASEAN Championship Group B	Philippines	0–1	Thailand	Capas, Philippines
21:00 UTC+8		Report	Waris 84'	Stadium: New Clark City Athletics Stadium; Attendance: 2,786; Referee: Yusuke Ohashi (Japan)

August 8 2026 ASEAN Championship Group B	Malaysia	1–0	Philippines	Kuala Lumpur, Malaysia
21:00 UTC+8	Pavithran 16'	Report		Stadium: Kuala Lumpur Stadium; Attendance: 12,734; Referee: Alimardon Bainazarov (Kyrgyzstan)

September 26 2026 ASEAN Cup Division 1 Group B	Vietnam	1–0	Philippines	Bandung, Indonesia
20:02 UTC+7 (Note: The Vietnam v Philippines match, originally scheduled for 19:30 UTC+7, was delayed for 32 minutes due to weather conditions.)		Report		Stadium: Si Jalak Harupat Stadium; Referee: Thoriq Alkatiri (Indonesia)

September 29 2026 ASEAN Cup Division 1 Group B	Philippines	2–2	Pakistan	Bandung, Indonesia
15:00 UTC+7	Reyes 24'; Kristensen 32' (pen.)	Report	Khan 47'; Arshad 62'	Stadium: Si Jalak Harupat Stadium; Referee: Abdurashid Khudoyberganov (Uzbekistan)

October 2 2026 ASEAN Cup Division 1 Group B	Thailand	1–2	Philippines	Bandung, Indonesia
16:40 UTC+7	Sanron 55'	Report	Kristensen 3', 68'	Stadium: Si Jalak Harupat Stadium; Referee: Razlan Joffri Ali (Malaysia)
