= 2022 AFF Championship Group A =

Group A of the 2022 AFF Championship took place from 20 December 2022 to 2 January 2023. It consisted of defending champions Thailand, the Philippines, Indonesia, Cambodia, and Brunei.

Thailand and Indonesia advanced to the semi-finals as the top two teams in the group, both on ten points. Cambodia finished third, the Philippines finished fourth, having won one match, while Brunei finished fifth without registering a single point.

== Teams ==
Draw position	Team	Appearance	Previous best performance	FIFA Ranking (October 2022)
A1	Thailand	14th	Winners (1996, 2000, 2002, 2014, 2016, 2020)	111
A2	Philippines	13th	Semi-finalists (2010, 2012, 2014, 2018)	133
A3	Indonesia	14th	Runners-up (2000, 2002, 2004, 2010, 2016, 2020)	151
A4	Cambodia	9th	Group stage (1996, 2000, 2002, 2004, 2008, 2016, 2018, 2020)	177
A5	Brunei	2nd	Group stage (1996)	190

== Standings ==
Pos	Team	Pld	W	D	L	GF	GA	GD	Pts	Qualification
1	Thailand	4	3	1	0	13	2	+11	10	Advance to knockout stage
2	Indonesia	4	3	1	0	12	3	+9	10	Advance to knockout stage
3	Cambodia	4	2	0	2	10	8	+2	6	
4	Philippines	4	1	0	3	8	10	−2	3	
5	Brunei	4	0	0	4	2	22	−20	0	Play qualification for the next edition

Source: AFF

== Matches ==
=== Cambodia vs Philippines ===
20 December 2022
17:00 UTC+7

Cambodia	3–2	Philippines
Bunheing 16', 59'; Chanpolin 20'	Report (AFFMEC); Report (AFF)	Daniels 41', 55'

Morodok Techo National Stadium, Phnom Penh
Attendance: 4,860
Referee: Majed Al Shamrani (Saudi Arabia)

Cambodia	Philippines

GK	1	Keo Soksela
CB	4	Tes Sambath		(substituted off) 79'
CB	3	Choun Chanchav
CB	5	Soeuy Visal (c)
DM	8	Orn Chanpolin		(substituted off) 61'
RM	16	Yeu Muslim
LM	18	Seut Baraing
AM	12	Sos Suhana
RF	15	Reung Bunheing		(substituted off) 61'
CF	9	Sieng Chanthea		(substituted off) 90+2'
LF	7	Lim Pisoth		(substituted off) 79'
Substitutions:
MF	20	Boris Kok	(yellow card) 64'	(substituted on) 61'
FW	10	Keo Sokpheng		(substituted on) 61'
FW	14	Nick Taylor		(substituted on) 79'
DF	2	Taing Bunchhai		(substituted on) 79'
MF	23	Thierry Chantha Bin		(substituted on) 90+2'
Manager:
(Japan) Ryu Hirose

GK	1	Kevin Ray Mendoza
RB	2	Simen Lyngbø
CB	12	Amani Aguinaldo
CB	4	Jefferson Tabinas
LB	19	Hikaru Minegishi		(substituted off) 63'
CM	10	Oliver Bias		(substituted off) 83'
CM	8	Arnel Amita		(substituted off) 46'
CM	11	Yrick Gallantes		(substituted off) 46'
AM	17	Stephan Schröck (c)	(yellow card) 53'
CF	9	Kenshiro Daniels		(substituted off) 74'
CF	20	Mark Hartmann
Substitutions:
MF	6	Sandro Reyes		(substituted on) 46'
DF	23	Audie Menzi		(substituted on) 46'
MF	7	Jesus Melliza		(substituted on) 63'
FW	14	Jarvey Gayoso		(substituted on) 74'
MF	22	Pocholo Bugas		(substituted on) 83'
Manager:
(Spain) Josep Ferré

Man of the Match:
Lim Pisoth (Cambodia)

Assistant referees:
Fahad Awaiedh Al Umri (Saudi Arabia)
Nurhadi Sulchan (Indonesia)
Fourth official:
Thoriq Alkatiri (Indonesia)

Overall
Statistics	Cambodia	Philippines
Goals scored	3	2
Total shots	14	10
Shots on target	7	7
Ball possession	47.3%	52.7%
Corner kicks	4	2
Fouls committed	14	15
Offsides	0	3
Yellow cards	1	1
Red cards	0	0

=== Brunei vs Thailand ===
20 December 2022
20:30 UTC+8

Brunei	0–5	Thailand
	Report (AFFMEC); Report (AFF)	Bordin 19'; Teerasil 44'; Yura 88' (o.g.); Peeradon 90+1' (pen.), 90+3'

Kuala Lumpur Stadium, Kuala Lumpur (Malaysia) (Note: Brunei played their home matches in Malaysia due to their stadium not meeting the tournament standards.)
Attendance: 480
Referee: Chen Hsin-chuan (Chinese Taipei)

Brunei	Thailand

GK	1	Haimie Abdullah Nyaring
CB	16	Yura Indera Putera
CB	12	Khairil Shahme Suhaimi	(substituted off) 23'
CB	5	Nur Ikhwan Othman
RWB	13	Haziq Kasyful Azim	(substituted off) 63'
LWB	2	Alinur Rashimy Jufri
CM	14	Hamizan Aziz Sulaiman
CM	15	Hendra Azam Idris (c)	(substituted off) 63'
CM	11	Najib Tarif
CF	21	Razimie Ramlli	(substituted off) 70'
CF	23	Hakeme Yazid Said	(substituted off) 70'
Substitutions:
DF	19	Hanif Hamir	(substituted on) 23'
DF	17	Wafi Aminuddin	(substituted on) 63'
MF	6	Azwan Saleh	(substituted on) 63'
FW	9	Abdul Azizi Ali Rahman	(substituted on) 70'
FW	10	Adi Said	(substituted on) 70'
Manager:
(Spain) Mario Rivera

GK	20	Kittipong Phuthawchueak
CB	15	Suphanan Bureerat
CB	4	Pansa Hemviboon
CB	3	Theerathon Bunmathan (c)
RM	9	Adisak Kraisorn	(substituted off) 46'
CM	12	Kritsada Kaman
CM	6	Sarach Yooyen	(substituted off) 81'
LM	2	Sasalak Haiprakhon
RF	17	Ekanit Panya	(substituted off) 81'
CF	10	Teerasil Dangda	(substituted off) 72'
LF	11	Bordin Phala	(substituted off) 72'
Substitutions:
FW	21	Poramet Arjvirai	(substituted on) 46'
MF	7	Sumanya Purisai	(substituted on) 72'
FW	13	Jaroensak Wonggorn	(substituted on) 72'
MF	8	Peeradon Chamratsamee	(substituted on) 81'
MF	22	Channarong Promsrikaew	(substituted on) 81'
Manager:
(Brazil) Alexandré Pölking

Man of the Match:
Theerathon Bunmathan (Thailand)

Assistant referees:
Chen Hsiao-en (Chinese Taipei)
Nguyễn Trung Hậu (Vietnam)
Fourth official:
Ngô Duy Lân (Vietnam)

Overall
Statistics	Brunei Darussalam	Thailand
Goals scored	0	5
Total shots	2	27
Shots on target	2	16
Ball possession	20.1%	79.9%
Corner kicks	0	12
Fouls committed	13	6
Offsides	0	3
Yellow cards	0	0
Red cards	0	0

=== Philippines vs Brunei ===
23 December 2022
18:00 UTC+8

Philippines	5–1	Brunei
Daniels 7'; Reyes 12'; Melliza 50'; Rasmussen 51', 88'	Report (AFFMEC); Report (AFF)	Razimie 70'

Rizal Memorial Stadium, Manila
Attendance: 1,650
Referee: Tam Ping Wun (Hong Kong)

Philippines	Brunei

GK	16	Julian Schwarzer	(substituted off) 90'
RB	23	Audie Menzi
CB	12	Amani Aguinaldo	(substituted off) 60'
CB	4	Jefferson Tabinas
LB	22	Pocholo Bugas
CM	17	Stephan Schröck (c)
CM	6	Sandro Reyes
CM	7	Jesus Melliza
RF	9	Kenshiro Daniels	(substituted off) 46'
CF	10	Oliver Bias
LF	20	Mark Hartmann	(substituted off) 60'
Substitutions:
DF	13	Sebastian Rasmussen	(substituted on) 46'
FW	14	Jarvey Gayoso	(substituted on) 60'
DF	18	Christian Rontini	(substituted on) 60'
GK	15	Anthony Pinthus	(substituted on) 90'
Manager:
(Spain) Josep Ferré

GK	1	Haimie Abdullah Nyaring
CB	17	Wafi Aminuddin		(substituted off) 46'
CB	16	Yura Indera Putera
CB	5	Nur Ikhwan Othman
RM	4	Fakharrazi Hassan
CM	7	Azwan Ali Rahman		(substituted off) 70'
CM	6	Azwan Saleh		(substituted off) 56'
LM	3	Abdul Mu'iz Sisa
RF	9	Abdul Azizi Ali Rahman		(substituted off) 61'
CF	10	Adi Said (c)		(substituted off) 46'
LF	23	Hakeme Yazid Said
Substitutions:
FW	21	Razimie Ramlli		(substituted on) 46'
DF	12	Khairil Shahme Suhaimi		(substituted on) 46'
FW	13	Haziq Kasyful Azim		(substituted on) 56'
FW	8	Nazirrudin Ismail	(yellow card) 64'	(substituted on) 61'
MF	15	Hendra Azam Idris	(yellow card) 75'	(substituted on) 70'
Manager:
(Spain) Mario Rivera

Man of the Match:
Jesus Melliza (Philippines)

Assistant referees:
So Kai Man (Hong Kong)
Arif Shamil Rasid (Malaysia)
Fourth official:
Tuan Mohd Yassin (Malaysia)

Overall
Statistics	Philippines	Brunei Darussalam
Goals scored	5	1
Total shots	19	7
Shots on target	8	3
Ball possession	62.9%	37.1%
Corner kicks	3	2
Fouls committed	8	9
Offsides	0	0
Yellow cards	0	3
Red cards	0	0

=== Indonesia vs Cambodia ===
23 December 2022
16:30 UTC+7

Indonesia	2–1	Cambodia
Egy 7'; Witan 35'	Report (AFFMEC); Report (AFF)	Krya 16'

Gelora Bung Karno Stadium, Jakarta
Attendance: 25,332
Referee: Ryuji Sato (Japan)

Indonesia	Cambodia

GK	22	Nadeo Argawinata
RB	14	Asnawi Mangkualam		(substituted off) 61'
CB	19	Fachruddin Aryanto (c)
CB	4	Jordi Amat	(yellow card) 86'
LB	12	Pratama Arhan		(substituted off) 52'
RM	8	Witan Sulaeman		(substituted off) 82'
CM	23	Marc Klok
LM	10	Egy Maulana Vikri		(substituted off) 46'
AM	6	Marselino Ferdinan
AM	15	Ricky Kambuaya
CF	18	Muhammad Rafli		(substituted off) 46'
Substitutions:
FW	7	Saddil Ramdani		(substituted on) 46'
FW	9	Ilija Spasojević		(substituted on) 46'
FW	2	Yakob Sayuri		(substituted on) 52'
DF	3	Edo Febriansah		(substituted on) 61'
FW	11	Dendy Sulistyawan		(substituted on) 82'
Manager:
(South Korea) Shin Tae-yong

GK	1	Keo Soksela
RB	13	Sareth Krya
CB	3	Choun Chanchav
CB	8	Orn Chanpolin
LB	18	Seut Baraing
DM	4	Tes Sambath
DM	5	Soeuy Visal (c)		(substituted off) 73'
CM	6	In Sodavid		(substituted off) 68'
RF	15	Reung Bunheing		(substituted off) 46'
CF	9	Sieng Chanthea		(substituted off) 84'
LF	7	Lim Pisoth		(substituted off) 67'
Substitutions:
FW	17	Sa Ty		(substituted on) 46'
FW	10	Keo Sokpheng		(substituted on) 67'
MF	20	Boris Kok	(yellow card) 68'	(substituted on) 68'
MF	23	Thierry Chantha Bin		(substituted on) 73'
FW	11	Mat Noron		(substituted on) 84'
Manager:
(Japan) Ryu Hirose

Man of the Match:
Keo Soksela (Cambodia)

Assistant referees:
Jun Mihara (Japan)
Kota Watanabe (Japan)
Fourth official:
Kyaw Zwall Lwin (Myanmar)

Overall
Statistics	Indonesia	Cambodia
Goals scored	2	1
Total shots	16	3
Shots on target	8	2
Ball possession	54.6%	45.4%
Corner kicks	5	3
Fouls committed	11	9
Offsides	6	2
Yellow cards	1	1
Red cards	0	0

=== Brunei vs Indonesia ===
26 December 2022
18:00 UTC+8

Brunei	0–7	Indonesia
	Report (AFFMEC); Report (AFF)	Syahrian 20'; Dendy 41'; Egy 59'; Spasojević 60'; Sananta 68'; Klok 86'; Sayuri 90+2'

Kuala Lumpur Stadium, Kuala Lumpur (Malaysia)
Attendance: 5,439
Referee: Kim Hee-gon (South Korea)

Brunei	Indonesia

GK	1	Haimie Abdullah Nyaring
CB	17	Wafi Aminuddin
CB	12	Khairil Shahme Suhaimi
CB	19	Hanif Hamir		(substituted off) 14'
RWB	2	Alinur Rashimy Jufri	(yellow card) 24' (yellow-red card) 38'
LWB	11	Najib Tarif
CM	22	Shafie Effendy		(substituted off) 46'
CM	15	Hendra Azam Idris (c)		(substituted off) 58'
CM	8	Nazirrudin Ismail		(substituted off) 67'
CF	9	Abdul Azizi Ali Rahman		(substituted off) 46'
CF	23	Hakeme Yazid Said
Substitutions:
DF	16	Yura Indera Putera		(substituted on) 14'
FW	13	Haziq Kasyful Azim		(substituted on) 46'
DF	4	Fakharrazi Hassan		(substituted on) 46'
MF	7	Azwan Ali Rahman		(substituted on) 58'
FW	21	Razimie Ramlli		(substituted on) 67'
Manager:
(Spain) Mario Rivera

GK	22	Nadeo Argawinata
RB	14	Asnawi Mangkualam (c)	(yellow card) 62'	(substituted off) 63'
CB	16	Hansamu Yama
CB	5	Rizky Ridho	(yellow card) 9'	(substituted off) 81'
LB	3	Edo Febriansah
DM	13	Rachmat Irianto
RM	10	Egy Maulana Vikri		(substituted off) 63'
CM	17	Syahrian Abimanyu
LM	7	Saddil Ramdani
CF	11	Dendy Sulistyawan		(substituted off) 74'
CF	9	Ilija Spasojević		(substituted off) 63'
Substitutions:
FW	2	Yakob Sayuri		(substituted on) 63'
FW	8	Witan Sulaeman		(substituted on) 63'
FW	21	Ramadhan Sananta		(substituted on) 63'
FW	18	Muhammad Rafli		(substituted on) 74'
MF	23	Marc Klok		(substituted on) 81'
Manager:
(South Korea) Shin Tae-yong

Man of the Match:
Yakob Sayuri (Indonesia)

Assistant referees:
Kang Dong-ho (South Korea)
Supawan Hinthong (Thailand)
Fourth official:
Ahmad A'Qashah (Singapore)

Overall
Statistics	Brunei Darussalam	Indonesia
Goals scored	0	7
Total shots	6	26
Shots on target	4	13
Ball possession	28.7%	71.3%
Corner kicks	3	7
Fouls committed	8	9
Offsides	0	4
Yellow cards	0	2
Red cards	1	0

=== Thailand vs Philippines ===
26 December 2022
19:30 UTC+7

Thailand	4–0	Philippines
Teerasil 3', 41' (pen.); Adisak 57'; Suphanan 63'	Report (AFFMEC); Report (AFF)

Thammasat Stadium, Pathum Thani
Attendance: 6,567
Referee: Yudai Yamamoto (Japan)

Thailand	Philippines

GK	20	Kittipong Phuthawchueak
CB	15	Suphanan Bureerat
CB	4	Pansa Hemviboon
CB	3	Theerathon Bunmathan (c)
RM	9	Adisak Kraisorn	(substituted off) 64'
CM	12	Kritsada Kaman
CM	6	Sarach Yooyen	(substituted off) 77'
LM	2	Sasalak Haiprakhon
RF	17	Ekanit Panya	(substituted off) 88'
CF	10	Teerasil Dangda	(substituted off) 64'
LF	11	Bordin Phala	(substituted off) 64'
Substitutions:
MF	22	Channarong Promsrikaew	(substituted on) 64'
MF	8	Peeradon Chamratsamee	(substituted on) 64'
FW	21	Poramet Arjvirai	(substituted on) 64'
MF	18	Weerathep Pomphan	(substituted on) 77'
FW	13	Jaroensak Wonggorn	(substituted on) 88'
Manager:
(Brazil) Alexandré Pölking

GK	16	Julian Schwarzer
RB	2	Simen Lyngbø		(substituted off) 46'
CB	12	Amani Aguinaldo
CB	4	Jefferson Tabinas
LB	23	Audie Menzi
RM	9	Kenshiro Daniels		(substituted off) 88'
CM	8	Arnel Amita		(substituted off) 46'
LM	20	Mark Hartmann
AM	17	Stephan Schröck (c)
AM	7	Jesus Melliza		(substituted off) 59'
CF	10	Oliver Bias		(substituted off) 68'
Substitutions:
FW	13	Sebastian Rasmussen		(substituted on) 46'
MF	6	Sandro Reyes		(substituted on) 46'
FW	19	Hikaru Minegishi		(substituted on) 59'
DF	18	Christian Rontini	(yellow card) 75'	(substituted on) 68'
DF	22	Pocholo Bugas		(substituted on) 88'
Manager:
(Spain) Josep Ferré

Man of the Match:
Teerasil Dangda (Thailand)

Assistant referees:
Isao Nishihashi (Japan)
Takumi Takagi (Japan)
Fourth official:
Xaypasert Phongsanit (Laos)

Overall
Statistics	Thailand	Philippines
Goals scored	4	0
Total shots	22	3
Shots on target	12	2
Ball possession	58.3%	41.7%
Corner kicks	9	2
Fouls committed	10	10
Offsides	2	1
Yellow cards	0	1
Red cards	0	0

=== Cambodia vs Brunei ===
29 December 2022
17:00 UTC+7

Cambodia	5–1	Brunei
Chanchav 31'; Taylor 50' (pen.); Sokpheng 73' (pen.); Pisoth 80', 88'	Report (AFFMEC); Report (AFF)	Ikhwan 21'

Morodok Techo National Stadium, Phnom Penh
Attendance: 6,169
Referee: Choi Hyun-jai (South Korea)

Cambodia	Brunei

GK	1	Keo Soksela
CB	4	Tes Sambath	(yellow card) 18'
CB	3	Choun Chanchav
CB	5	Soeuy Visal (c)		(substituted off) 57'
DM	8	Orn Chanpolin	(yellow card) 90+4'
RM	16	Yeu Muslim
LM	18	Seut Baraing
AM	12	Sos Suhana		(substituted off) 78'
RF	17	Sa Ty		(substituted off) 46'
CF	15	Reung Bunheing		(substituted off) 46'
LF	14	Nick Taylor		(substituted off) 57'
Substitutions:
FW	9	Sieng Chanthea		(substituted on) 46'
FW	7	Lim Pisoth		(substituted on) 46'
FW	10	Keo Sokpheng		(substituted on) 57'
MF	6	In Sodavid		(substituted on) 57'
FW	11	Mat Noron		(substituted on) 78'
Manager:
(Japan) Ryu Hirose

GK	1	Haimie Abdullah Nyaring (c)	(yellow card) 83'
CB	16	Yura Indera Putera	(yellow card) 4'	(substituted off) 65'
CB	12	Khairil Shahme Suhaimi
CB	5	Nur Ikhwan Othman
RWB	4	Fakharrazi Hassan		(substituted off) 56'
LWB	3	Abdul Mu'iz Sisa	(yellow card) 83'
CM	13	Haziq Kasyful Azim
CM	7	Azwan Ali Rahman		(substituted off) 65'
CM	8	Nazirrudin Ismail		(substituted off) 46'
SS	14	Hamizan Aziz Sulaiman		(substituted off) 65'
CF	23	Hakeme Yazid Said	(yellow card) 77'
Substitutions:
FW	21	Razimie Ramlli		(substituted on) 46'
MF	6	Azwan Saleh		(substituted on) 56'
DF	17	Wafi Aminuddin		(substituted on) 65'
MF	15	Hendra Azam Idris		(substituted on) 65'
FW	10	Adi Said		(substituted on) 65'
Manager:
(Spain) Mario Rivera

Man of the Match:
Lim Pisoth (Cambodia)

Assistant referees:
Kwak Seung-soon (South Korea)
Ronnie Koh Min Kiat (Singapore)
Fourth official:
Pansa Chaisanit (Thailand)

Overall
Statistics	Cambodia	Brunei
Goals scored	5	1
Total shots	23	9
Shots on target	13	6
Ball possession	61.5%	38.5%
Corner kicks	2	4
Fouls committed	12	12
Offsides	1	1
Yellow cards	3	4
Red cards	0	0

=== Indonesia vs Thailand ===
29 December 2022
16:30 UTC+7

Indonesia	1–1	Thailand
Klok 50' (pen.)	Report (AFFMEC); Report (AFF)	Sarach 79'

Gelora Bung Karno Stadium, Jakarta
Attendance: 49,985
Referee: Mohammed Al Hoaish (Saudi Arabia)

Indonesia	Thailand

GK	22	Nadeo Argawinata
RB	14	Asnawi Mangkualam
CB	19	Fachruddin Aryanto (c)
CB	4	Jordi Amat	(yellow card) 88'
LB	12	Pratama Arhan
RM	2	Yakob Sayuri
DM	13	Rachmat Irianto		(substituted off) 75'
CM	23	Marc Klok
LM	10	Egy Maulana Vikri		(substituted off) 59'
SS	8	Witan Sulaeman		(substituted off) 75'
CF	11	Dendy Sulistyawan		(substituted off) 87'
Substitutions:
FW	7	Saddil Ramdani		(substituted on) 59'
MF	15	Ricky Kambuaya		(substituted on) 75'
FW	18	Muhammad Rafli		(substituted on) 75'
MF	6	Marselino Ferdinan		(substituted on) 87'
Manager:
(South Korea) Shin Tae-yong

GK	20	Kittipong Phuthawchueak
CB	15	Suphanan Bureerat
CB	4	Pansa Hemviboon
CB	3	Theerathon Bunmathan (c)	(yellow card) 49'
RM	2	Sasalak Haiprakhon	(yellow card) 78'
CM	12	Kritsada Kaman
CM	6	Sarach Yooyen
LM	11	Bordin Phala		(substituted off) 82'
AM	17	Ekanit Panya		(substituted off) 87'
AM	22	Channarong Promsrikaew		(substituted off) 46'
CF	10	Teerasil Dangda		(substituted off) 73'
Substitutions:
MF	14	Sanrawat Dechmitr	(red card) 62'	(substituted on) 46'
FW	9	Adisak Kraisorn		(substituted on) 73'
MF	8	Peeradon Chamratsamee		(substituted on) 82'
DF	16	Jakkapan Praisuwan		(substituted on) 87'
Manager:
(Brazil) Alexandré Pölking

Man of the Match:
Theerathon Bunmathan (Thailand)

Assistant referees:
Khalaf Zaid Al Shammari (Saudi Arabia)
Faisal Nasser Al Qahtani (Saudi Arabia)
Fourth official:
Muhammad Taqi Al Jaafari (Singapore)

Overall
Statistics	Indonesia	Thailand
Goals scored	1	1
Total shots	8	5
Shots on target	3	1
Ball possession	40.3%	59.7%
Corner kicks	0	5
Fouls committed	27	14
Offsides	0	5
Yellow cards	1	2
Red cards	0	1

=== Thailand vs Cambodia ===
2 January 2023
19:30 UTC+7

Thailand	3–1	Cambodia
Teerasil 45+2' (pen.), 90'; Sumanya 50'	Report (AFFMEC); Report (AFF)	Chanthea 68'

Thammasat Stadium, Pathum Thani
Attendance: 8,415
Referee: Omar Mohamed Al Ali (United Arab Emirates)

Thailand	Cambodia

GK	20	Kittipong Phuthawchueak
CB	15	Suphanan Bureerat		(substituted off) 73'
CB	4	Pansa Hemviboon
CB	3	Theerathon Bunmathan (c)
RM	9	Adisak Kraisorn		(substituted off) 46'
CM	12	Kritsada Kaman
CM	6	Sarach Yooyen
LM	2	Sasalak Haiprakhon		(substituted off) 46'
RF	17	Ekanit Panya		(substituted off) 46'
CF	10	Teerasil Dangda
LF	11	Bordin Phala	(yellow card) 53'	(substituted off) 88'
Substitutions:
MF	7	Sumanya Purisai		(substituted on) 46'
MF	8	Peeradon Chamratsamee		(substituted on) 46'
MF	22	Channarong Promsrikaew		(substituted on) 46'
FW	13	Jaroensak Wonggorn		(substituted on) 73'
FW	21	Poramet Arjvirai		(substituted on) 88'
Manager:
(Brazil) Alexandré Pölking

GK	1	Keo Soksela
CB	4	Tes Sambath		(substituted off) 78'
CB	3	Choun Chanchav
CB	5	Soeuy Visal (c)
DM	8	Orn Chanpolin		(substituted off) 78'
RM	16	Yeu Muslim
LM	18	Seut Baraing		(substituted off) 69'
AM	12	Sos Suhana	(yellow card) 85'
RF	15	Reung Bunheing		(substituted off) 46'
CF	9	Sieng Chanthea
LF	7	Lim Pisoth		(substituted off) 69'
Substitutions:
FW	17	Sa Ty		(substituted on) 46'
DF	19	Cheng Meng		(substituted on) 69'
FW	14	Nick Taylor	(yellow card) 82'	(substituted on) 69'
MF	20	Boris Kok		(substituted on) 78'
MF	23	Thierry Chantha Bin		(substituted on) 78'
Manager:
(Japan) Ryu Hirose

Overall
Statistics	Thailand	Cambodia
Goals scored	3	1
Total shots	16	11
Shots on target	5	4
Ball possession	62.6%	37.4%
Corner kicks	3	2
Fouls committed	8	15
Offsides	1	0
Yellow cards	1	2
Red cards	0	0

=== Philippines vs Indonesia ===
2 January 2023
20:30 UTC+8

Philippines	1–2	Indonesia
Rasmussen 83'	Report (AFFMEC); Report (AFF)	Dendy 21'; Marselino 43'

Rizal Memorial Stadium, Manila
Attendance: 2,370
Referee: Ahmed Faisal Al Ali (Jordan)

Philippines	Indonesia

GK	15	Anthony Pinthus
RB	2	Simen Lyngbø		(substituted off) 81'
CB	12	Amani Aguinaldo
CB	4	Jefferson Tabinas
LB	23	Audie Menzi
DM	18	Christian Rontini
RM	10	Oliver Bias		(substituted off) 60'
LM	19	Hikaru Minegishi		(substituted off) 74'
AM	17	Stephan Schröck (c)
CF	9	Kenshiro Daniels		(substituted off) 80'
CF	20	Mark Hartmann		(substituted off) 60'
Substitutions:
MF	6	Sandro Reyes	(yellow card) 90+3'	(substituted on) 60'
DF	13	Sebastian Rasmussen		(substituted on) 60'
MF	21	Harry Nuñez		(substituted on) 74'
MF	7	Jesus Melliza		(substituted on) 80'
DF	22	Pocholo Bugas		(substituted on) 81'
Manager:
(Spain) Josep Ferré

GK	22	Nadeo Argawinata	(substituted off) 24'
RB	14	Asnawi Mangkualam
CB	19	Fachruddin Aryanto (c)
CB	5	Rizky Ridho
LB	12	Pratama Arhan
RM	8	Witan Sulaeman	(substituted off) 59'
CM	23	Marc Klok
LM	7	Saddil Ramdani	(substituted off) 60'
AM	6	Marselino Ferdinan	(substituted off) 85'
AM	15	Ricky Kambuaya
CF	11	Dendy Sulistyawan	(substituted off) 84'
Substitutions:
GK	20	Syahrul Trisna	(substituted on) 24'
FW	2	Yakob Sayuri	(substituted on) 59'
FW	10	Egy Maulana Vikri	(substituted on) 60'
FW	9	Ilija Spasojević	(substituted on) 84'
DF	13	Rachmat Irianto	(substituted on) 85'
Manager:
(South Korea) Shin Tae-yong

Overall
Statistics	Philippines	Indonesia
Goals scored	1	2
Total shots	8	16
Shots on target	4	9
Ball possession	44.8%	55.2%
Corner kicks	9	7
Fouls committed	9	9
Offsides	1	4
Yellow cards	1	0
Red cards	0	0
