= Marc Klok =

Indonesian footballer (born 1993)

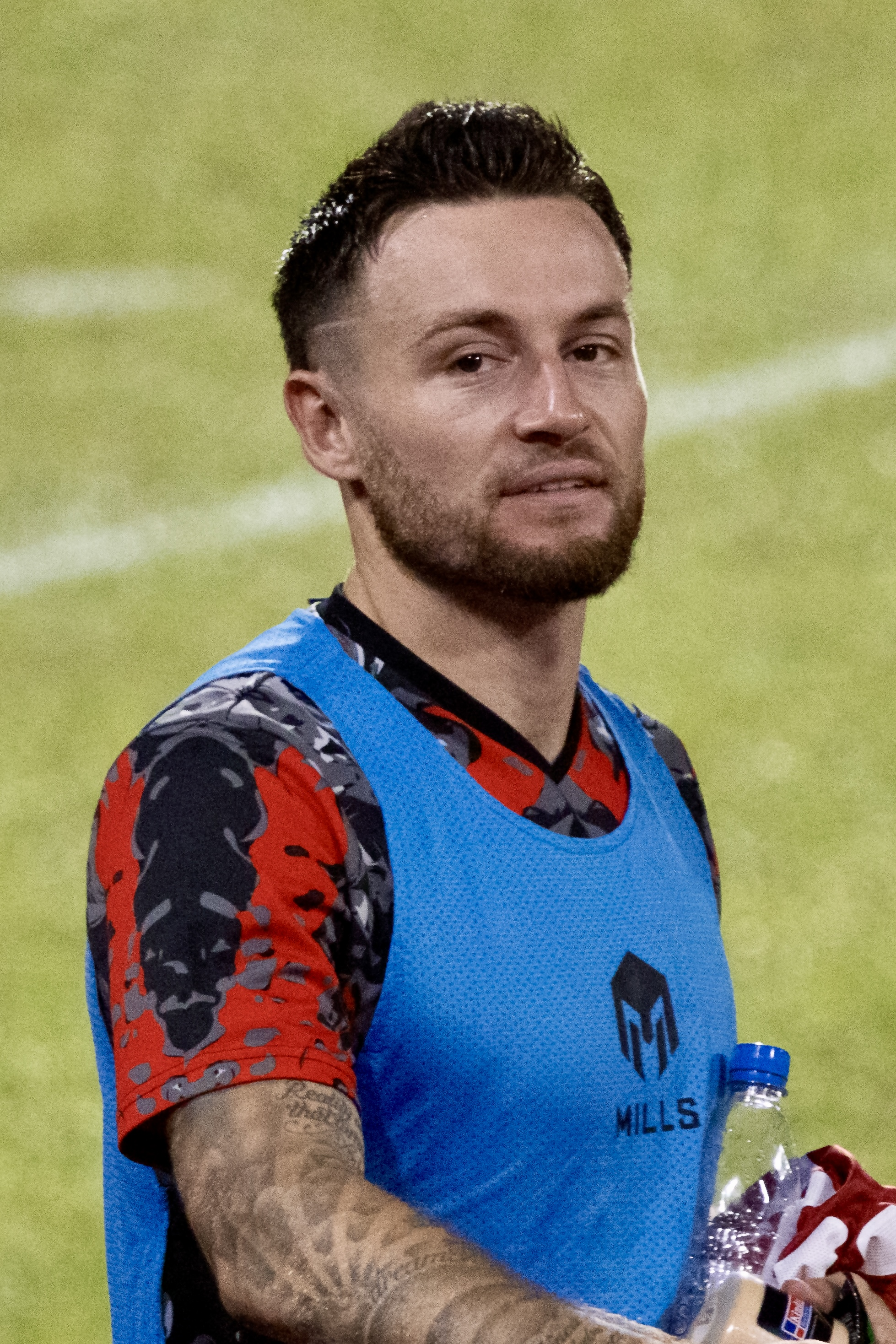
- Klok with Indonesia in 2023

Personal information
- Full name: Marc Anthony Klok
- Date of birth: 20 April 1993 (age 33)
- Place of birth: Amsterdam, Netherlands
- Height: 1.77 m (5 ft 10 in)
- Position: Midfielder

Team information
- Current team: Persib Bandung
- Number: 23

Youth career
- AVV Zeeburgia
- Utrecht

Senior career*
Years	Team	Apps	(Gls)
2011–2013	Jong Utrecht	17	(2)
2013–2014	Ross County	6	(0)
2014–2016	Cherno More	37	(0)
2016	Oldham Athletic	10	(0)
2017	Dundee	2	(0)
2017–2019	PSM Makassar	83	(14)
2020–2021	Persija Jakarta	2	(0)
2021–	Persib Bandung	145	(15)

International career^{‡}
2022	Indonesia SEA Games (O.P.)	6	(0)
2022–	Indonesia	27	(5)
Medal record
Men's football
Representing Indonesia
FIFA Series
Runner-up	2026 Indonesia
Southeast Asian Games
Bronze medal – third place	2021 Vietnam	Team
- * Club domestic league appearances and goals as of 1 November 2026 ‡ National team caps and goals as of 7 August 2026

Marc Anthony Klok (born 20 April 1993) is a professional footballer who plays as a midfielder for Super League club Persib Bandung. Born in the Netherlands, he represents the Indonesia national team.

Klok began his career with Utrecht, then joined Scottish Premiership club Ross County in 2013. After one season in Scotland, he joined Cherno More Varna and won the Bulgarian Cup and Bulgarian Supercup. After leaving Cherno More at the end of the 2015–16 season, he joined Oldham Athletic and played for Scottish club Dundee before moving to Indonesia at April 2017, representing PSM Makassar, Persija Jakarta, and Persib Bandung.

Born in the Netherlands, Klok opted to represent Indonesia after gaining Indonesian citizenship and made his debut in 2022. He represented the country at the AFC Asian Cup in 2023.

== Club career ==
=== In Europe ===
Born in Amsterdam, Klok signed for Scottish side Ross County from Utrecht in June 2013 and made his debut in the 4–1 home defeat to Celtic on 9 November. He was released in August 2014 after only six appearances.

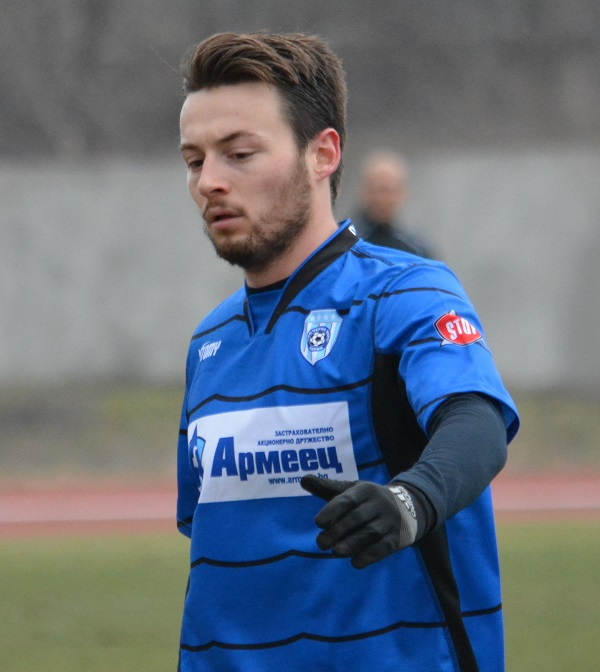
Klok playing for Cherno More in 2015

Two months later Klok signed a contract with Bulgarian club Cherno More Varna. He made his debut in a 2–0 away loss against Ludogorets Razgrad on 25 October and scored his first goal for the club in a 7–1 away victory against Pirin Razlog for Bulgarian Cup on 23 September 2015.

In July 2016, Klok signed a six-month contract with League One side Oldham Athletic. He made his competitive debut in a 3–0 away loss at Millwall on 6 August, coming on as a substitute for Ollie Banks.

Klok went on trial with Dundee in January 2017 and signed a short-term contract on 31 January. He left Dundee in April 2017, having made two appearances for the club.

=== In Indonesia ===
In April 2017, Klok joined Indonesian club PSM Makassar of the Liga 1. He made his debut in a 1–1 away draw against Mitra Kukar on 24 April 2017, and scored his first goal in a 2–0 win against Persipura Jayapura on 3 June 2017.

In January 2020 Klok signed a four-year contract with Persija Jakarta, but two months later the season was suspended due to the COVID-19 pandemic and later declared void.

==== Persib Bandung ====
Klok moved to Persib Bandung in June 2021. He scored on his league debut by converting a free kick in the 86th minute, in a 1–0 win against Barito Putera on 4 September 2021.

By January 2025, he had become part of Persib's “Club 100,” having made his 100th top-flight appearance in a match against PSBS Biak; accumulating 13 goals and 17 assists across those campaigns.

Under Klok's captaincy, Persib earned consecutive Liga 1 titles in the 2023–24 and 2024–25 seasons. Following their 2025 championship, he signed a two-year contract extension in June 2025, keeping him at the club through 2027, an arrangement made upon the recommendation of head coach Bojan Hodak.

== International career ==
After five years of playing in Indonesia and undergoing a complicated naturalization process, Klok represented his second country as one of the overaged players in the Indonesia U23 team at the 2021 SEA Games. He played in all of the six matches, including a bronze medal match against Malaysia U23 that ended with a victory for Indonesia through penalty shootouts. Klok scored the last and decisive shot.

On 1 June 2022, Klok earned his first senior cap in a friendly match against Bangladesh that ended 0–0. He was appointed as the captain of the team in the second half after the captain Fachruddin Aryanto was replaced at halftime.

On 8 June 2022, Klok scored his first senior goal in a 2023 AFC Asian Cup qualification match against Kuwait, converted a penalty kick in 2–1 win.

On 24 September 2022, Klok scored a goal in a friendly match against Curaçao in a 3–2 win.

Klok was called up for the 2022 AFF Championship with Indonesia on 19 December 2022. He scored twice, against Brunei, and Thailand in the tournament.

He was a member of the Indonesia squad that reached the knockout stage of the 2023 AFC Asian Cup.

In August 2025, Klok received his first called up to the national team under new manager Patrick Kluivert, for the friendly matches against Kuwait and Lebanon in September.

== Personal life ==
Klok is the nephew of former De Graafschap, Dunfermline Athletic and Motherwell footballer Rob Matthaei.

== Career statistics ==
=== Club ===
As of 1 November 2026

Appearances and goals by club, season and competition
Club	Season	League			National cup (Note: Includes Bulgarian Cup)		League cup (Note: Includes EFL Cup)		Continental		Other		Total	
Club	Season	Division	Apps	Goals	Apps	Goals	Apps	Goals	Apps	Goals	Apps	Goals	Apps	Goals
Ross County	2013–14	Scottish Premiership	6	0	0	0	0	0	—		—		6	0
Cherno More Varna	2014–15	A Group	13	0	6	0	—		—		—		19	0
Cherno More Varna	2015–16	A Group	24	0	2	1	—		2 (Note: Appearances in UEFA Europa League)	0	1 (Note: Appearance in Bulgarian Supercup)	0	29	1
Cherno More Varna	Total		37	0	8	1	0	0	2	0	1	0	48	1
Oldham Athletic	2016–17	League One	10	0	0	0	2	0	—		0	0	12	0
Dundee	2016–17	Scottish Premiership	2	0	—		—		—		—		2	0
PSM Makassar	2017	Liga 1	28	4	—		—		—		—		28	4
PSM Makassar	2018	Liga 1	29	6	—		—		—		—		29	6
PSM Makassar	2019	Liga 1	26	4	6	0	—		8 (Note: Appearances in AFC Cup)	3	3 (Note: Appearances in Indonesia President's Cup)	0	43	7
PSM Makassar	Total		83	14	6	0	0	0	8	3	3	0	100	17
Persija Jakarta	2020	Liga 1	2	0	—		—		—		—		2	0
Persija Jakarta	2021	Liga 1	0	0	—		—		—		8 (Note: Appearances in Menpora Cup)	1	8	1
Persija Jakarta	Total		2	0	0	0	0	0	0	0	8	1	10	1
Persib Bandung	2021–22	Liga 1	27	3	—		—		—		—		27	3
Persib Bandung	2022–23	Liga 1	25	4	—		—		0	0	1	0	26	4
Persib Bandung	2023–24	Liga 1	34	5	—		—		0	0	0	0	34	5
Persib Bandung	2024–25	Liga 1	28	1	—		—		6 (Note: Appearances in AFC Champions League Two)	0	2	0	36	1
Persib Bandung	2025–26	Super League	25	0	—		—		7	0	0	0	32	0
Persib Bandung	2026–27	Super League	6	2	—		—		3	0	1 (Note: Appearances in ASEAN Club Championship)	0	10	2
Persib Bandung	Total		145	15	—		—		16	0	4	0	165	15
Career total			285	29	14	1	2	0	26	3	16	1	343	34

=== International ===
As of match played 7 August 2026

Appearances and goals by national team and year
National team	Year	Apps	Goals
Indonesia	2022	8	4
Indonesia	2023	10	0
Indonesia	2024	3	0
Indonesia	2025	2	1
Indonesia	2026	4	0
Total		27	5

As of match played 5 September 2025
Scores and results list Indonesia's goal tally first, score column indicates score after each Klok goal.

List of international goals scored by Marc Klok
No.	Date	Venue	Cap	Opponent	Score	Result	Competition
1	8 June 2022	Jaber Al-Ahmad International Stadium, Kuwait City, Kuwait	2	Kuwait	1–1	2–1	2023 AFC Asian Cup qualification
2	24 September 2022	Gelora Bandung Lautan Api Stadium, Bandung, Indonesia	5	Curaçao	1–1	3–2	Friendly
3	26 December 2022	Kuala Lumpur Stadium, Kuala Lumpur, Malaysia	7	Brunei	6–0	7–0	2022 AFF Championship
4	29 December 2022	Gelora Bung Karno Stadium, Jakarta, Indonesia	8	Thailand	1–0	1–1	2022 AFF Championship
5	5 September 2025	Gelora Bung Tomo Stadium, Surabaya, Indonesia	22	Chinese Taipei	3–0	6–0	Friendly

== Honours ==
=== Club ===
PFC Cherno More Varna

- Bulgarian Cup: 2015
- Bulgarian Supercup: 2015

PSM Makassar

- Piala Indonesia: 2018–19

Persija Jakarta

- Menpora Cup: 2021

Persib Bandung

- Liga 1/Super League: 2023–24, 2024–25, 2025–26

=== International ===
Indonesia SEA Games

- SEA Games bronze medal: 2021

=== Individual ===
- AFC Cup Best Goal: 2019
- Liga 1 Team of the Season: 2019 (Substitutes), 2023–24
- Menpora Cup Best Player: 2021
- Menpora Cup Best Eleven: 2021
- Liga 1 Goal of the Month: February 2023

== See also ==
- List of Indonesia international footballers born outside Indonesia
