= Seut Baraing =

Cambodian footballer

Seut Baraing សឿត បារាំង
Personal information
- Full name: Seut Baraing
- Date of birth: 29 September 1999 (age 27)
- Place of birth: Siem Reap, Cambodia
- Height: 1.60 m (5 ft 3 in)
- Position: Left-back

Team information
- Current team: Preah Khan Reach Svay Rieng
- Number: 19

Youth career
- 2011–2016: Phnom Penh Crown

Senior career*
Years	Team	Apps	(Gls)
2016–2025	Phnom Penh Crown	160	(1)
2021	→ Angkor Tiger (loan)	15	(0)
2025–	Preah Khan Reach Svay Rieng	24	(1)

International career^{‡}
2016	Cambodia U19	3	(0)
2017–2022	Cambodia U22	5	(0)
2019–2022	Cambodia U23	6	(0)
2017–	Cambodia	15	(0)
- * Club domestic league appearances and goals as of 21:11, 9 November 2026 (UTC) ‡ National team caps and goals as of 6 March 2025

Seut Baraing (born 29 September 1999) is a Cambodian professional footballer who plays as a left-back for Cambodian Premier League club Preah Khan Reach Svay Rieng and the Cambodia national team.

== Club career ==
Baraing joined Cambodian side Phnom Penh Crown in 2011 and progressed through their youth ranks. He made his debut in February 2016 against Cambodian Tiger. He featured in both 2017 AFC Cup qualifying play-off games, as the Crown lost 7–3 over two legs to Singaporean side Home United.

== International career ==
Baraing represented Cambodia's under 19 team at the 2016 AFF U-19 Youth Championship, playing in three games. He was first called up to the senior side in January 2017 and made his full international debut in a 7–2 loss to Saudi Arabia, in which he played 90 minutes. Having impressed in this game, despite the result, head coach Leonardo Vitorino claimed he was the best left-back in the country. He cemented his place in the team, and made his second appearance in a 3–2 loss to India later the same year.

== Career statistics ==
=== Club ===
As of 3 December 2017

Club performance			League		Cup		Continental		Total	
Season	Club	League	Apps	Goals	Apps	Goals	Apps	Goals	Apps	Goals
Cambodia			League		Hun Sen Cup		AFC Cup		Total	
2016	Phnom Penh Crown	Cambodian League	15	0	5	0	–	–	20	0
2017	Phnom Penh Crown	Cambodian League	16	0	2	0	2	0	20	0
2018	Phnom Penh Crown	Cambodian League	2	0	0	0	–	–	1	0
Career total			33	0	7	0	2	0	41	0

=== International ===
As of matches played 2 January 2023.

National team	Year	Apps	Goals
Cambodia	2017	3	0
Cambodia	2021	1	0
Cambodia	2022	7	0
Cambodia	2023	1	0
Total		12	0

== Honours ==
Phnom Penh Crown

- Cambodian Premier League: 2022
- Hun Sen Cup: 2024–25
- Cambodian Super Cup: 2022, 2023
- Cambodian League Cup: 2022, 2023
