= Lim Pisoth =

Cambodian footballer

Lim Pisoth លឹម ពិសុទ្ធ
Personal information
- Full name: Lim Pisoth
- Date of birth: 29 August 2001 (age 25)
- Place of birth: Phnom Penh, Cambodia
- Height: 1.68 m (5 ft 6 in)
- Position: Winger

Team information
- Current team: Visakha
- Number: 17

Youth career
- 2012–2019: Phnom Penh Crown

Senior career*
Years	Team	Apps	(Gls)
2020–2025	Phnom Penh Crown	105	(45)
2025–	Visakha	23	(2)

International career^{‡}
2019–2022	Cambodia U19	4	(3)
2021–2023	Cambodia U23	7	(2)
2021–	Cambodia	28	(2)
- * Club domestic league appearances and goals as of 9:40, 9 November 2026 (UTC) ‡ National team caps and goals as of 9:40, 25 March 2025 (UTC)

Lim Pisoth (លឹម ពិសុទ្ធ; born 29 August 2001) is a Cambodian professional footballer who plays as a winger for Cambodian Premier League club Visakha and the Cambodia national team.

== Career statistics ==
As of matches played 29 October 2024.

National team	Year	Apps	Goals
Cambodia	2021	9	0
Cambodia	2022	4	0
Cambodia	2023	4	2
Cambodia	2024	8	0
Total		25	2

No.	Date	Venue	Opponent	Score	Result	Competition
1.	29 December 2022	Morodok Techo National Stadium, Phnom Penh, Cambodia	Brunei	4–1	5–1	2022 AFF Championship
2.	29 December 2022	Morodok Techo National Stadium, Phnom Penh, Cambodia	Brunei	5–1	5–1	2022 AFF Championship

== Honours ==
Phnom Penh Crown

- Cambodian Premier League: 2021, 2022
- Hun Sen Cup: 2024–25
- Cambodian Super Cup: 2022
- Cambodian League Cup: 2022, 2023
