= Pratama Arhan =

Indonesian footballer (born 2001)

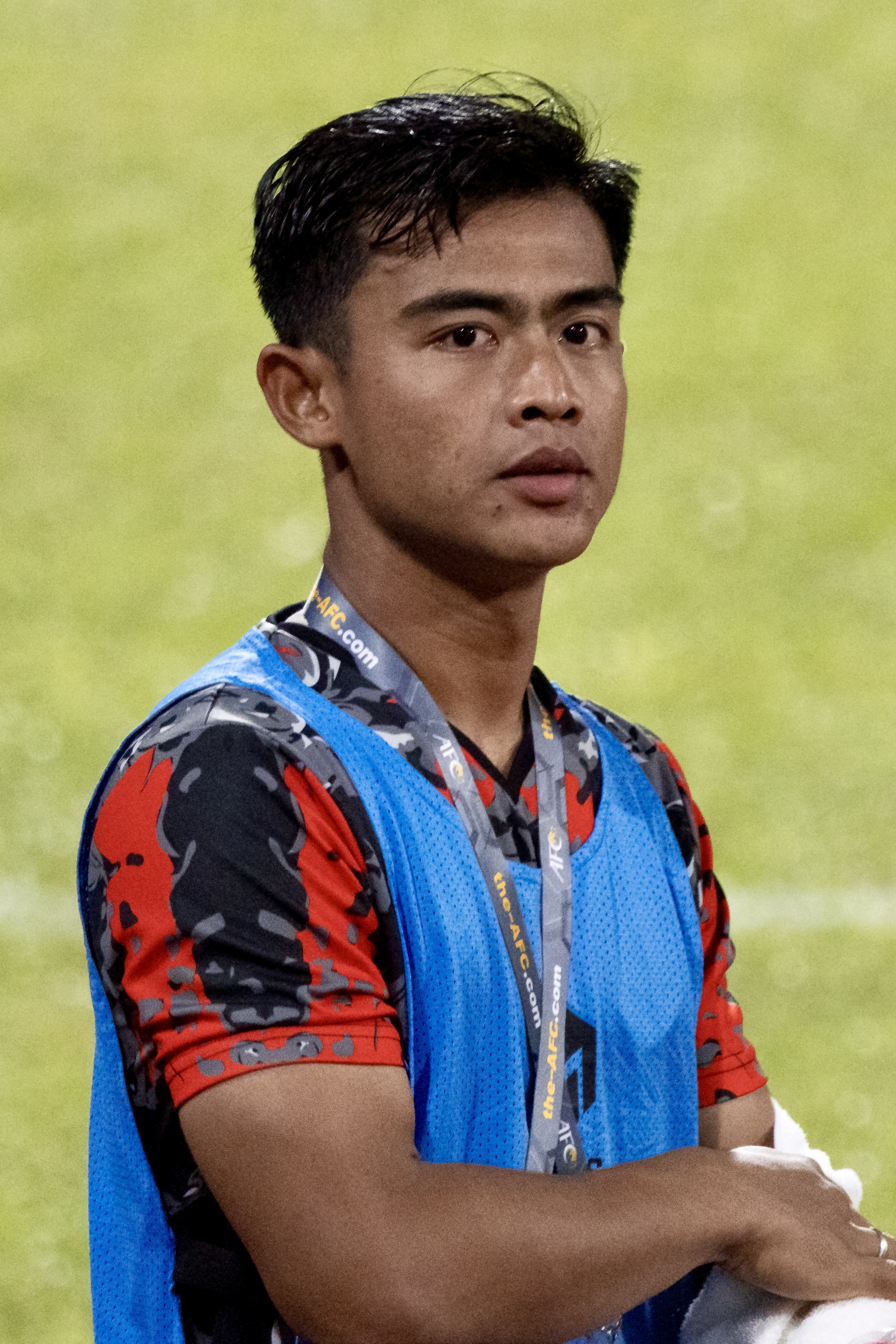
- Arhan with Indonesia in 2023

Personal information
- Full name: Pratama Arhan Alif Rifai
- Date of birth: 21 December 2001 (age 24)
- Place of birth: Blora, Indonesia
- Height: 1.72 m (5 ft 8 in)
- Position: Left-back

Team information
- Current team: Persija Jakarta
- Number: 18

Youth career
- 2012–2015: SSB Putra Mustika
- 2015–2018: SSB Terang Bangsa
- 2018–2020: PSIS Semarang

Senior career*
Years	Team	Apps	(Gls)
2020–2022	PSIS Semarang	10	(0)
2022–2024	Tokyo Verdy	2	(0)
2024–2025	Suwon	2	(0)
2025–2026	Bangkok United	20	(0)
2026–	Persija Jakarta	5	(0)

International career^{‡}
2020	Indonesia U19	8	(0)
2021–2024	Indonesia U23	12	(2)
2021–	Indonesia	54	(4)
Medal record
Men's football
Representing Indonesia
Southeast Asian Games
Gold medal – first place	2023 Cambodia	Team
AFF Championship
Runner-up	2020 Singapore	Team
- * Club domestic league appearances and goals as of 1 8 November 2026 ‡ National team caps and goals as of 21 December 2024

Pratama Arhan Alif Rifai (born 21 December 2001) is an Indonesian professional footballer who plays as a left-back for Super League club Persija Jakarta and the Indonesia national team. He is most known for his powerful throw-ins and free kicks. Arhan was also a nominee of the AFC's 11 players to watch in 2023.

== Club career ==
=== PSIS Semarang ===
Pratama Arhan made his first-team debut for PSIS Semarang in the 2021 Menpora Cup, in which he played 90 minutes in all of his team's four matches in the tournament that preluded the 2021 Liga 1 season.

He scored two goals in that competition, one of them was a free-kick that was among the best goals in the tournament. He also won the tourney's Best Young Player award. Arhan made his league debut on 4 September 2021 in a match against Persela Lamongan.

=== Tokyo Verdy ===
On 16 February 2022, Arhan is officially signed with J2 League club, Tokyo Verdy for a two-year contract with free transfer fee. Arhan made his league debut on 6 July 2022, against Tochigi SC in a 1–0 victory. On 19 January 2023, Arhan's contract was renewed by Tokyo Verdy ahead of 2023 season. Arhan participated twice in 2023 edition of Emperor's Cup, when Tokyo Verdy eventually lost to their capital city rivals, FC Tokyo, in the 3rd round match on 12 July 2023.

On 6 August 2023, Arhan played for 10 minutes in his second league match overall and first in a year when Verdy lost 0–1 at home to Shimizu S-Pulse.

=== Suwon FC ===
On 16 January 2024, Arhan signed for K League 1 club Suwon FC for an undisclosed fee. On 26 May 2024, Arhan made his debut as a substitute against Jeju United. Arhan entered the field at the 73rd minutes, however he immediately received a red card just three minutes later.

=== Bangkok United ===
On 7 January 2025, Thai League 1 club Bangkok United reached an agreement to sign Arhan. Arhan immediately made his debut five days after the signing, against Buriram United, coming on as a substitute in the 80th minute during a 3–2 victory.

He was selected by the Thai League 1 as the Young Player of the Week in February 2025 after being the first-11 in the match against Nakhon Ratchasima FC. On 14 February 2025, He made his debut in AFC Champions League 2 as a substitute in the 85th minute and was able to make the crucial one-touch assist to his teammate Thitiphan Puangchan on the 90+5 minute to equalize Sydney FC on a 2–2 draw at Sydney Football Stadium

== International career ==
Arhan debuted for the Indonesia U-19 team when it faced the Bulgaria U-19 in a friendly on 5 September 2020 in Croatia. He captained the same team during another friendly match during a two-month Croatia training, this time Indonesia drew with the North Macedonia U-19 team. He received a call up to the senior Indonesia national football team in May 2021.

On 25 May 2021, He earned his first senior cap in a friendly match in Dubai against Afghanistan. On 19 December 2021, Arhan scored his debut goal for the national team in a 2020 AFF Championship game against Malaysia in Kallang. and he also became man of the match in that match. On 25 December 2021, Arhan scored again against Singapore in the second leg of semi-final in a 4–2 victory after extra-time. He was awarded the "Young Player of the Tournament" for the tournament.

On 24 September 2022, Arhan made two assists, with one of them through a long throw-in, in a friendly match in against Curaçao in a 3–2 win.

Arhan was called up for his second AFF Championship tournament by Shin Tae-yong. On 2 January 2023, Arhan gave another assists from long thrown-in to Dendy Sulistyawan in Indonesia's 1–2 away win against Philippines at Rizal Memorial Stadium. Arhan was named in the final squad for the 2023 AFC Asian Cup tournament. In the match against Japan, Arhan made a long throw in that helped Sandy Walsh scored a goal through an erroneous header by Takumi Minamino.

== Personal life ==
Arhan started a relationship with Azizah Salsha, the daughter of a member of the Indonesian House of Representatives Andre Rosiade. They married in August 2023 at Indonesian mosque at Tokyo, and the Chairman of the Football Association of Indonesia at that time, Erick Thohir was a witness during the ceremony.

On 1 August 2025, Arhan filed for divorce, which was finalized on 25 August 2025.

== Career statistics ==
=== Club ===
As of match played 5 February 2026

Club	Season	League			National cup (Note: Includes Emperor's Cup, Thai FA Cup)		League cup		Continental		Other		Total	
Club	Season	Division	Apps	Goals	Apps	Goals	Apps	Goals	Apps	Goals	Apps	Goals	Apps	Goals
PSIS Semarang	2020	Liga 1	0	0	0	0	—		—		0	0	0	0
PSIS Semarang	2021–22	Liga 1	9	0	0	0	—		—		4 (Note: Appearances in Menpora Cup)	2	13	2
PSIS Semarang	Total		9	0	0	0	—		—		4	2	13	2
Tokyo Verdy	2022	J2 League	1	0	0	0	—		—		—		1	0
Tokyo Verdy	2023	J2 League	1	0	2	0	—		—		—		3	0
Tokyo Verdy	Total		2	0	2	0	—		—		—		4	0
Suwon FC	2024	K League 1	2	0	0	0	—		—		—		2	0
Bangkok United	2024–25	Thai League 1	11	0	1	0	1	0	2 (Note: Appearances in AFC Champions League Two)	0	—		15	0
Bangkok United	2025–26	Thai League 1	9	0	1	0	1	0	2	0	2 (Note: Appearances in ASEAN Club Championship)	0	15	0
Bangkok United	Total		20	0	2	0	2	0	4	0	2	0	30	0
Career total			33	0	4	0	2	0	4	0	6	2	48	2

=== International ===
As of match played 21 December 2024

Appearances and goals by national team and year
National team	Year	Apps	Goals
Indonesia	2021	14	2
Indonesia	2022	11	1
Indonesia	2023	11	0
Indonesia	2024	18	0
Total		54	3

As of match played 19 November 2024
Indonesia score listed first, score column indicates score after each Arhan goal

List of international goals scored by Pratama Arhan
No.	Date	Venue	Cap	Opponent	Score	Result	Competition
1	19 December 2021	National Stadium, Kallang, Singapore	12	Malaysia	3–1	4–1	2020 AFF Championship
2	25 December 2021	National Stadium, Kallang, Singapore	14	Singapore	2–2	4–2 (a.e.t.)	2020 AFF Championship
3	27 January 2022	Kapten I Wayan Dipta Stadium, Gianyar, Indonesia	16	Timor-Leste	2–1	4–1	Friendly

== Honours ==
Persija Jakarta

- Piala Presiden third place: 2026

Indonesia U-23

- SEA Games gold medal: 2023

Indonesia

- AFF Championship runner-up: 2020

Individual

- Menpora Cup Best Young Player: 2021
- Menpora Cup Best Eleven: 2021
- 2020 AFF Championship: Team of the Tournament
- AFF Championship Young Player of the Tournament: 2020
