= Yeu Muslim =

Cambodian footballer

Personal information
- Full name: Yeu Muslim
- Date of birth: 25 December 1998 (age 27)
- Place of birth: Kandal, Cambodia
- Height: 1.70 m (5 ft 7 in)
- Positions: Right-back; right wing

Team information
- Current team: Boeung Ket
- Number: 77

Youth career
- 2010–2015: Phnom Penh Crown

Senior career*
Years	Team	Apps	(Gls)
2015–2026	Phnom Penh Crown	128	(32)
2026–	Boeung Ket	5	(1)

International career^{‡}
- Cambodia U19
- Cambodia U23
2019–	Cambodia	21	(0)
- * Club domestic league appearances and goals as of 9 November 2026 ‡ National team caps and goals as of 6 March 2025

Yeu Muslim (born 25 December 1998) is a Cambodian professional footballer who mainly plays as a winger for Boeung Ket. He is part of the Cambodia national team.

== Personal life ==
Born in Kandal, Yeu is a Cambodian Muslim.

== Club career ==
Yeu was promoted to the Phnom Penh Crown first team in 2015, winning a Cambodian League title in his first season. He made his AFC Cup debut in 2017, playing in both legs of their 3–7 aggregate defeat to Home United.

In January 2020 he signed a two-year contract extension. During the 2020 season, he was forced to spend time at right-back due to the number of talented midfielders on the squad.

== International career ==
Yeu represented the Cambodian national under-19 team at the 2016 AFF U-19 Youth Championship in Vietnam. He also played for the Cambodian national under-23 team at the 2019 Southeast Asian Games and the 2020 AFC U-23 Championship qualification phase.

He earned his first senior international cap for Cambodia on 9 March 2019, playing the full 90 minutes in a 1–0 friendly loss to Bangladesh. He came off the bench for two appearances during the second round of 2022 World Cup qualification.

== International statistics ==
As of match played 11 August 2020.

National team	Year	Apps	Goals
Cambodia	2019	4	0
Total		4	0

== Honours ==
=== Club ===
Phnom Penh Crown

- Cambodian Premier League: 2015, 2021, 2022
- Hun Sen Cup: 2024–25
- Cambodian Super Cup: 2022, 2023
- Cambodian League Cup: 2022, 2023
