= Yakob Sayuri =

Indonesian footballer

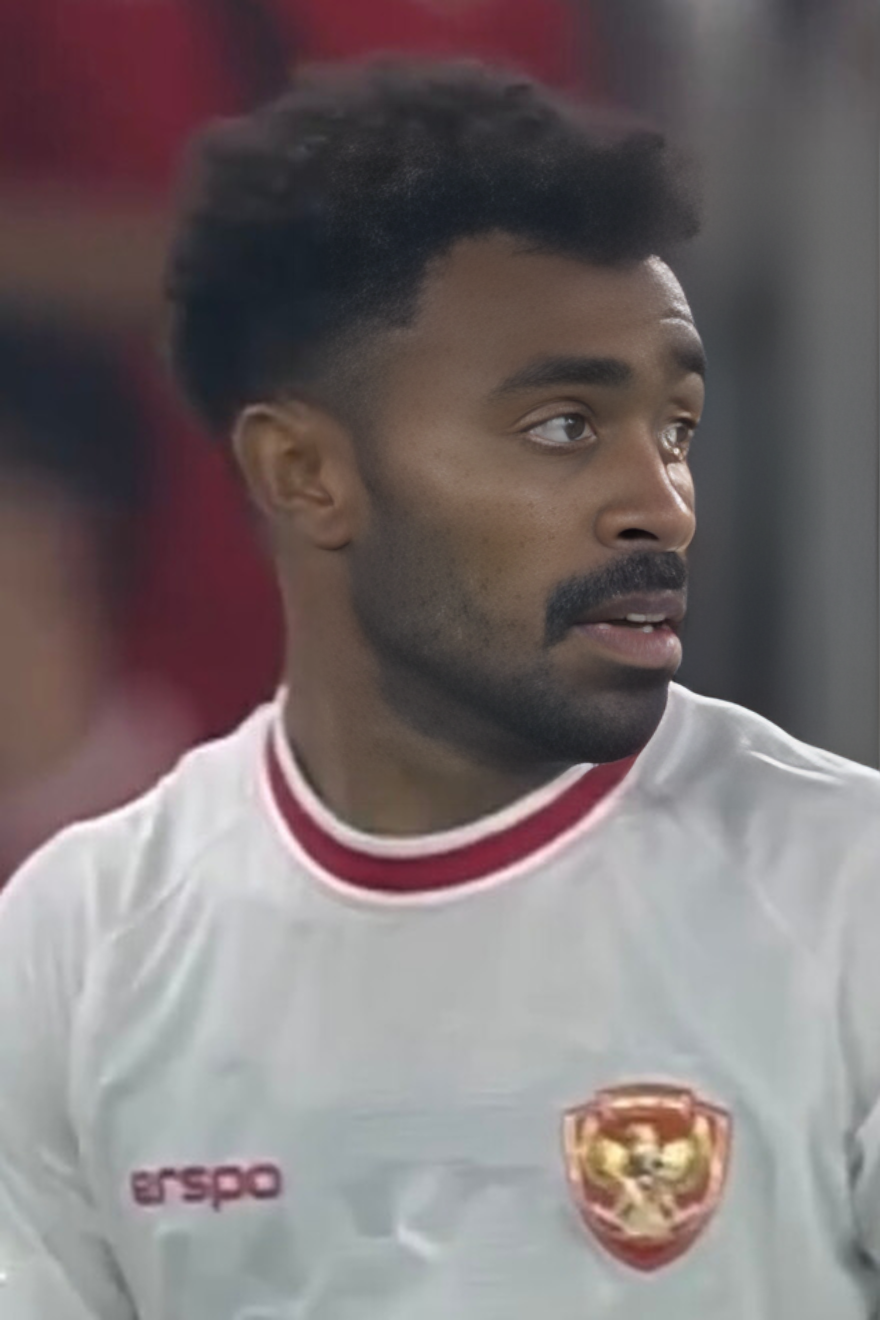
- Sayuri playing for Indonesia in 2024

Personal information
- Full name: Yakob Sayuri
- Date of birth: 22 September 1997 (age 29)
- Place of birth: Yapen, Indonesia
- Height: 1.71 m (5 ft 7 in)
- Positions: Winger; wing-back

Team information
- Current team: Java United
- Number: 12

Senior career*
Years	Team	Apps	(Gls)
2017	Persewar Waropen	8	(1)
2018	Persemi Mimika	10	(13)
2018	Persewar Waropen	5	(0)
2019	Barito Putera	22	(1)
2020–2024	PSM Makassar	91	(19)
2024–	Java United	64	(18)

International career^{‡}
2019	Indonesia U23	2	(0)
2021–	Indonesia	35	(3)
Medal record
Men's football
Representing Indonesia
FIFA Series
Runner-up	2026 Indonesia
- * Club domestic league appearances and goals as of 19 September 2026 ‡ National team caps and goals as of 5 June 2026

Yakob Sayuri (born 22 September 1997), commonly known as Yassa, is an Indonesian professional footballer who plays as a winger or wing-back for Super League club Java United and the Indonesia national team. He is the twin brother of Yance Sayuri, who is also a footballer.

== Club career ==
=== Early career ===
Coming from the remote island chain of Yapen in Papua province, Yakob had no experience training in any football academy or organized youth team. He started his professional career in 2017 in the third-tier of Indonesian football with Persewar Waropen after coach Eduard Ivakdalam, a former national team player, found Yakob casually playing in his hometown of Serui. Yakob followed Ivakdalam when the coach moved to Persemi Mimika in 2018.

=== Barito Putera ===
Yakob signed with Liga 1 club Barito Putera. In his breakout season, Yakob played 25 matches and scored twice.

=== PSM Makassar ===
Yakob signed with PSM Makassar in 2020. Yakob made his club debut on 1 February 2020 against PSS Sleman.

On 26 February 2020, Yakob scored his first AFC Cup goal for PSM Makassar in the 53rd minute of a 3–1 win against Myanmar National League club Shan United, especially for the second goal that was scored by Yakob, this goal was not only successful in helping PSM win. However, it also made it into the AFC Goal of The Week nomination. Yakob only made 2 appearances in the Liga 1 and 3 appearances in the 2020 AFC Cup with PSM in the 2020 season due to the COVID-19 pandemic. Even so, Yakob impressed in PSM's international matches in the 2020 AFC Cup. This led to invitations to train for the Indonesia senior team under coach Shin Tae-yong.

On 18 September 2021, Yakob made his first league goal for the club in a 3–1 win over Persebaya Surabaya. He scored again in a 2–1 loss to Borneo Samarinda on 22 October and in a 2–1 win against PS Barito Putera on 28 January 2022.

On 7 February, Yakob scored in injury time of second half against Bali United. On 29 August, he scored a brace in a 5–1 win over Persib Bandung. He scored again in 45th minute in a 3–0 win over Persebaya on 10 September.

On 30 January 2023, Yakob scored another brace in a 3–1 win against RANS Nusantara.

== International career ==
Yakob made his international debut for the Indonesia under-23 side on 7 June 2019 against Thailands. He received a call-up to the senior Indonesia team in May 2021. He earned his first senior cap in a friendly against Afghanistan on 25 May.

Yakob scored his first international goal in injury time in Indonesia's 7–0 win over Brunei on 26 December 2022. He was chosen as man of the match in the return fixture against Brunei in the 2022 AFF Championship.

Yakob scored his second international goal against Burundi on 25 March 2023. On 28 March, Yakob started again, against the same opponent, this time alongside his brother, Yance. Making them the first twin brothers that played at the same time for the Indonesia senior team.

On 5 January 2024, Yakob scored a goal against Libya in a 1–2 loss in a friendly match as part of the 2023 AFC Asian Cup preparations. Yakob was included in the final-squad for the tournament. He made a wonderful assist to Marselino Ferdinan against Iraq. Yakob helped the national reached its first ever knockout stage.

== Career statistics ==
=== Club ===
As of match played 19 September 2026

Club	Season	League			Cup (Note: Includes Piala Indonesia)		League Cup		Continental (Note: Appearances in AFC Cup)		Other		Total	
Club	Season	Division	Apps	Goals	Apps	Goals	Apps	Goals	Apps	Goals	Apps	Goals	Apps	Goals
Persewar Waropen	2017 Liga 3 Papua	Liga 3 Papua	8	1	0	0	–		0	0	0	0	8	1
Persemi Mimika	2018 Liga 3 Papua	Liga 3 Papua	10	13	0	0	–		0	0	0	0	10	13
Persewar Waropen	2018 Liga 3 (Indonesia)	Liga 3 (Indonesia)	5	0	0	0	–		0	0	0	0	5	0
Barito Putera	2019	Liga 1	22	1	1	1	–		0	0	0	0	23	2
PSM Makassar	2020	Liga 1	2	0	0	0	–		3	1	0	0	5	1
PSM Makassar	2021–22	Liga 1	29	6	0	0	–		0	0	7 (Note: Appearances in Menpora Cup)	2	36	8
PSM Makassar	2022–23	Liga 1	25	7	0	0	–		4	2	4 (Note: Appearances in Indonesia President's Cup)	0	33	9
PSM Makassar	2023–24	Liga 1	30	6	0	0	–		6	1	0	0	36	7
PSM Makassar	Total		86	19	0	0	–		13	4	11	2	110	25
Java United	2024–25	Liga 1	28	10	0	0	–		–		0	0	28	10
Java United	2025–26	Super League	27	8	0	0	–		–		0	0	27	8
Java United	2026–27	Super League	9	1	0	0	1	0	–		0	0	10	1
Career total			195	53	1	1	1	0	13	4	11	2	221	60

=== International ===
As of match played 5 June 2026

Appearances and goals by national team and year
National team	Year	Apps	Goals
Indonesia	2021	1	0
Indonesia	2022	5	1
Indonesia	2023	4	1
Indonesia	2024	14	1
Indonesia	2025	5	0
Indonesia	2026	2	0
Total		35	3

As of match played 11 June 2024
Scores and results list Indonesia's goal tally first, score column indicates score after each Sayuri goal.

List of international goals scored by Yakob Sayuri
No.	Date	Venue	Cap	Opponent	Score	Result	Competition
1	26 December 2022	Kuala Lumpur Stadium, Kuala Lumpur, Malaysia	6	Brunei	7–0	7–0	2022 AFF Championship
2	25 March 2023	Patriot Candrabhaga Stadium, Bekasi, Indonesia	11	Burundi	1–0	3–1	Friendly
3	5 January 2024	Mardan Sports Complex, Aksu, Turkey	16	Libya	1–0	1–2	Friendly

== Honours ==
PSM Makassar

- Liga 1: 2022–23

Individual

- Liga 1 Team of the Season: 2022–23, 2024–25
- APPI Indonesian Football Award Best 11: 2024–25
- AFC Asian Cup Assist of the Tournament: 2023
