= Bjørn Martin Kristensen =

Filipino footballer (born 2002)

Personal information
- Full name: Bjørn Martin Davis Kristensen
- Date of birth: 4 May 2002 (age 24)
- Place of birth: Oslo, Norway
- Height: 1.83 m (6 ft 0 in)
- Positions: Forward; winger

Team information
- Current team: KFUM
- Number: 22

Youth career
- 2014–2016: Hauketo
- 2017–2020: Nordstrand

Senior career*
Years	Team	Apps	(Gls)
2019–2020	Nordstrand	1	(0)
2021–2022	Grorud	35	(10)
2022–2024	Aalesund	47	(6)
2025–	KFUM	48	(5)

International career^{‡}
2021	Norway U20	1	(0)
2024–	Philippines	20	(16)
- * Club domestic league appearances and goals as of 12 October 2026 ‡ National team caps and goals as of 20:00; 2 October 2026 (UTC+8)

Bjørn Martin Davis Kristensen (born 4 May 2002) is a professional footballer who plays as a forward or winger for Eliteserien club KFUM. Born in Norway, he plays for the Philippines national team.

== Club career ==
=== Youth ===
Born in Norway, Kristensen began his career with the youth team of Hauketo and Nordstrand.

=== Nordstrand ===
Kristensen made his league debut for the senior team of Nordstrand in a 0–1 away defeat against Kråkerøy in the Norsk Tipping-Ligaen, coming in as a substitute replacing Mikkel Fodstad in the 77th minute.

=== Grorud ===
In January 2021, Kristensen signed for 1. divisjon club Grorud. He made his debut for the club in a 1–0 home win against Strømmen, coming in as a substitute replacing Oscar Aga in the 75th minute.

=== Aalesund ===
On 23 August 2022, Kristensen signed for Eliteserien club Aalesund on a three-year contract for a reported fee of €200,000. He made his debut in the top flight in a 1–3 home defeat against Sarpsborg 08, coming in as a substitute replacing Gilbert Koomson in the 82nd minute. On June 11, 2023, Kristensen scored his first Eliteserien goal in a 1–3 home defeat against Tromsø.

=== KFUM Oslo ===
On 19 December 2024, it was announced that Kristensen has signed for Eliteserien club KFUM.

== International career ==
Kristensen was born in Norway to a Norwegian father and a Filipina mother making him eligible to play for either Norway or Philippines at international level.

=== Norway U20 ===
In August 2021, Kristensen was included in the 20-player squad of the Norway U20 that competed in the 2021–22 Under 20 Elite League. In November 2021, he made his debut for Norway U20 in a 1–1 away draw against Czech Republic U20, coming in as a substitute replacing Magnus Knudsen in the 75th minute.

=== Philippines ===
In 2024, Kristensen was reportedly among the diaspora players being recruited by head coach Tom Saintfiet to play for Philippines. Several months later, Kristensen was included in the 23-man squad of the Philippines for the 2024 Merdeka Tournament in Malaysia. He made his debut for the Philippines in a 2–1 defeat against Malaysia. Kristensen scored his first international goal for the Philippines in a 3–1 defeat against Thailand in the 2024 King's Cup semi-finals. He scored his second goal on 14 November 2024 in a friendly match against Hong Kong in a 3–1 defeat.

On 9 October 2025, Kristensen scored a haul (four goals) against Timor-Leste in a 4–1 win in the 2027 AFC Asian Cup qualification third round.

== Career statistics ==
=== International ===
As of match played 2 October 2026

Appearances and goals by national team and year
National team	Year	Apps	Goals
Philippines	2024	11	5
Philippines	2025	5	8
Philippines	2026	4	3
Total		20	16

Scores and results list Philippines' goal tally first, score column indicates score after each Kristensen goal.

Key
‡	Indicates goal was scored from a penalty kick

List of international goals scored by Bjørn Martin Kristensen
No.	Cap	Date	Venue	Opponent	Score	Result	Competition
1	3	11 October 2024	Tinsulanon Stadium, Songkhla, Thailand	Thailand	1–1	1–3	2024 King's Cup
2	5	14 November 2024	Hong Kong Stadium, So Kon Po, Hong Kong	Hong Kong	1–1	1–3	Friendly
3	6	12 December 2024	Rizal Memorial Stadium, Manila, Philippines	Myanmar	1–1‡	1–1	2024 ASEAN Championship
4	9	21 December 2024	Manahan Stadium, Surakarta, Indonesia	Indonesia	1–0‡	1–0	2024 ASEAN Championship
5	11	30 December 2024	Rajamangala Stadium, Bangkok, Thailand	Thailand	1–2	1–3	2024 ASEAN Championship
6	12	25 March 2025	New Clark City Athletics Stadium, Capas, Philippines	Maldives	2–0	4–1	2027 AFC Asian Cup qualification
7	13	10 June 2025	New Clark City Athletics Stadium, Capas, Philippines	Tajikistan	1–0	2–2	2027 AFC Asian Cup qualification
8	13	10 June 2025	New Clark City Athletics Stadium, Capas, Philippines	Tajikistan	2–2	2–2	2027 AFC Asian Cup qualification
9	14	9 October 2025	Territory Rugby League Stadium, Darwin, Australia	Timor-Leste	1–0	4–1	2027 AFC Asian Cup qualification
10	14	9 October 2025	Territory Rugby League Stadium, Darwin, Australia	Timor-Leste	2–0	4–1	2027 AFC Asian Cup qualification
11	14	9 October 2025	Territory Rugby League Stadium, Darwin, Australia	Timor-Leste	3–1	4–1	2027 AFC Asian Cup qualification
12	14	9 October 2025	Territory Rugby League Stadium, Darwin, Australia	Timor-Leste	4–1	4–1	2027 AFC Asian Cup qualification
13	15	14 October 2025	New Clark City Athletics Stadium, Capas, Philippines	Timor-Leste	2–1	3–1	2027 AFC Asian Cup qualification
14	19	29 September 2026	Si Jalak Harupat Stadium, Bandung, Indonesia	Pakistan	1–0‡	2–2	2026 FIFA ASEAN Cup
15	20	2 October 2026	Si Jalak Harupat Stadium, Bandung, Indonesia	Thailand	1–0	2–1	2026 FIFA ASEAN Cup
16	20	2 October 2026	Si Jalak Harupat Stadium, Bandung, Indonesia	Thailand	2–1	2–1	2026 FIFA ASEAN Cup
