= Dendy Sulistyawan =

Indonesian footballer and policeman

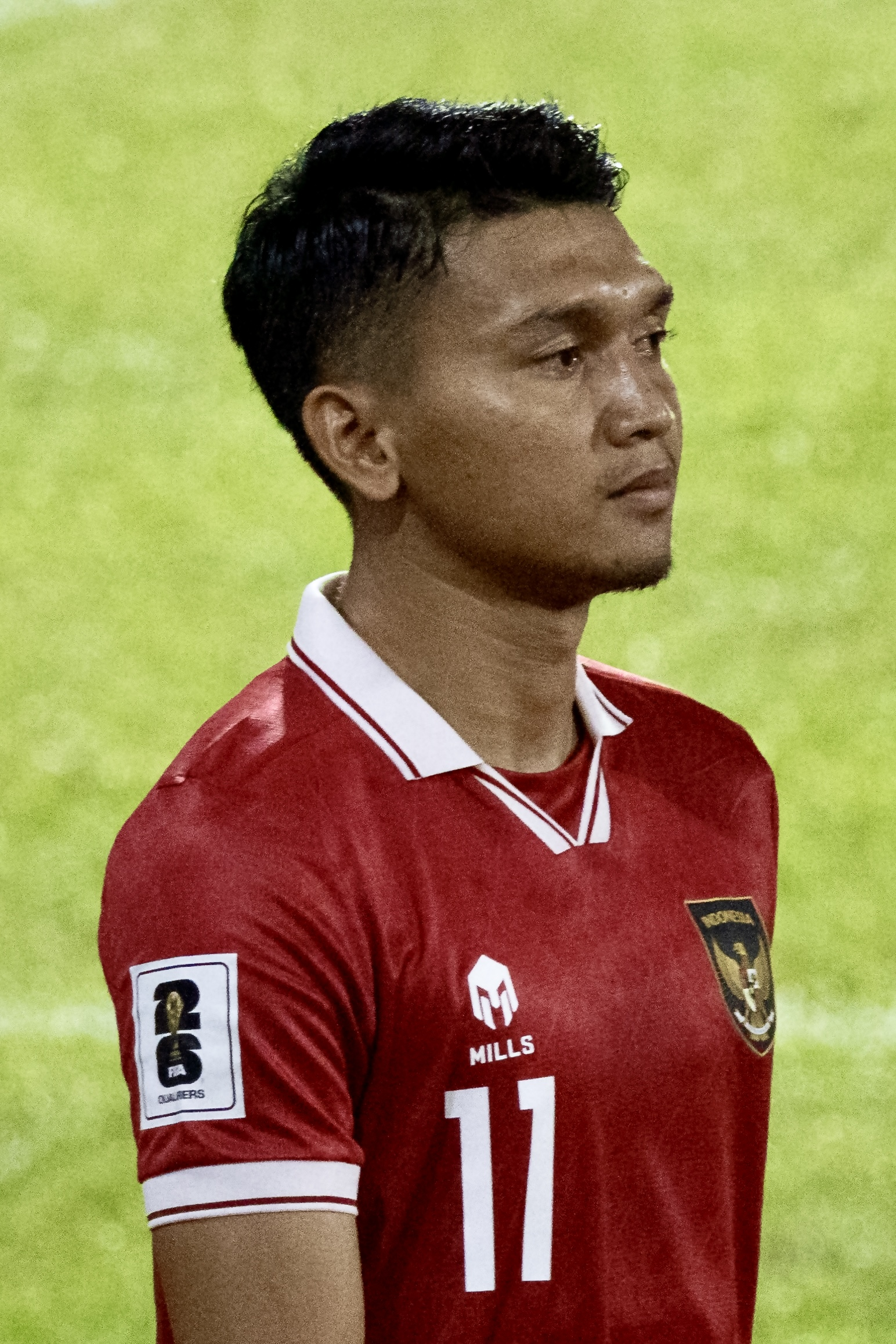
- Dendy playing for Indonesia in 2023

Personal information
- Full name: Dendy Sulistyawan
- Date of birth: 12 October 1996 (age 30)
- Place of birth: Lamongan, Indonesia
- Height: 1.76 m (5 ft 9 in)
- Positions: Forward; winger

Team information
- Current team: Persela Lamongan
- Number: 22

Youth career
- 2014–2016: Persela Lamongan

Senior career*
Years	Team	Apps	(Gls)
2016–2017	Persela Lamongan	32	(7)
2017–2026	Bhayangkara	199	(30)
2018	→ Persela Lamongan (loan)	16	(9)
2026–	Persela Lamongan	3	(1)

International career
2022–2024	Indonesia	17	(5)
- * Club domestic league appearances and goals as of 27 September 2026

Dendy Sulistyawan (born 12 October 1996) is an Indonesian professional footballer who plays as a forward or winger for Championship club Persela Lamongan. He is also a Second Police Brigadier in the Indonesian National Police.

== Club career ==
=== Persela Lamongan ===
Dendy made his debut for Persela Lamongan from Persela U-21. He appeared with Persela in the 2015 Piala Presiden. While still playing in the kodim tournament, he scored in every match. Dendy joined in the squad of Persela for 2016 Indonesia Soccer Championship A. Dendy made his debut in 2016 against Persegres Gresik United in the first week. In the eighth week against PS Barito Putera, Dendy scored for the first time against Barito.

=== Bhayangkara FC ===
In 2017, Dendy signed a contract with Liga 1 club Bhayangkara. He made his debut on 20 April 2017 in a match against Perseru Serui, coming on as a substitute for Thiago Furtuoso in the 57th minute. On 13 July 2017, he gave assists to Alsan Sanda in Bhayangkara's 2–1 win over Madura United. On 4 August 2017, Dendy made his first league goal for the club in Liga 1, opening the scoring in a 2–1 won against Arema at the Patriot Stadium, Bekasi. Dendy scored in the 21st minute and assisted an opening goal by Paulo Sérgio in Bhayangkara's 3–2 win over Persiba Balikpapan on 8 October 2017. During the 2017 season, he made 21 league appearances and scored 2 goals for Bhayangkara.

==== Persela Lamongan (loan) ====
On 26 July 2018, Bhayangkara manager, Sumardji, announced that Dendy with his teammates, Ambrizal and Panggih Prio Sembodho signed for Persela Lamongan to play in the Liga 1 in the half of 2018 season, on loan from Bhayangkara. He made his club debut of the season on 29 July 2018, coming as a substitutes in second half for Fahmi Al-Ayyubi and scored his first goal in second half for Persela with scored hat-trick in a 3–2 home win against Persipura Jayapura at the Surajaya Stadium, Lamongan. On 21 September, he made his first assists to Fahmi Al-Ayyubi in Persela's 3–2 away lose over PSMS Medan. On 2 November, he scored a brace for the club in a 3–0 home win against Sriwijaya, with a 3–0 victory, brought Persela to 10th place league table. a week later, he scored the opening goal in a 1–1 draw over Mitra Kukar. a week later, he scored the opening goal in the first half and give another assists to Loris Arnaud in Persela's 4–0 win over Arema at Surajaya Stadium. Despite having just had a good half of the season for Persela with 16 league appearances and total scoring 9 goals in 2018 season, Dendy decided to re-join Bhayangkara because his status at the Persela was on loan to get lots of playing minutes.

==== Return to Bhayangkara ====
After his loan ended with Persela and he returned to Bhayangkara. In January 2019, Bhayangkara has finally officially announced the extension of Dendy's contract, on his Instagram account, he uploaded a photo of signing a contract with technical director Yeyen Tumena. On 22 November 2019, Dendy scored his first goal of the 2019 season in a 1–2 away win against Madura United. Dendy finished the season with only one goal in 25 league appearances, and for the 2020 season, Dendy only played 2 times for the club because the league was officially discontinued due to the COVID-19 pandemic.

On 6 November 2021, Dendy scored his first league goal of the 2021–22 season, scoring in injury time in a 2–0 win over PSM Makassar. On 18 November, he scored in a 2–1 lose over Persita Tangerang.

On 20 February 2022, He was involved in Bhayangkara's big 4–0 win over Persikabo 1973, scoring a goal in the 76th minute. On 7 March 2022, Dendy scored the decisive goal for the club's 2–1 win over PSS Sleman at the Kompyang Sujana Stadium, he was also selected as man of the match in that match. On 20 March 2022, He also involved in Bhayangkara's big 4–0 win over Persela, scoring from header in the 50th minute, the goal he scored was quite touching and so emotional for him, because he was born in Lamongan, he also had time with Persela in the 2016 season. In fact, Persela became his first team to start his professional career as a footballer. He made 34 league appearances and scored five goals for Bhayangkara during the 2021–22 season.

On 24 July 2022, he started his match in the 2022–23 Liga 1 season for Bhayangkara in a 2–2 draw over Persib Bandung. His form in September saw him score two further goals in losses against Persija Jakarta (2–1), and draw against Borneo Samarinda (2–2). The number of appearances slowly increased and until recently became a main player of The Guardian. His status as a regular player at Bhayangkara made the coach of the Indonesia national team, Shin Tae-yong, call him in the FIFA Matchday against Curaçao.

On 2 February 2023, he scored in a 1–3 win over Persis Solo. Five days later, he scored from header in a 3–2 home win against Persikabo 1973 at Wibawa Mukti Stadium. On 20 February, Dendy scored the opening goal against Madura United, leading Bhayangkara to a dominant 4–0 victory at the Wibawa Mukti Stadium. And continued scored his seventh goal of the season in a 3–1 home win against Bali United on 11 March, scored from a corner taken quickly by Matías Mier. On 30 March, Dendy scored a brace for the club in a 5–1 home win against RANS Nusantara.

== International career ==
On 24 September 2022, Dendy made his first cap for the Indonesia national team for a friendly match against Curacao in a 3–2 win. A few days later, on 27 September 2022, he scored a goal against the same opponent in a 2–1 victory.

Dendy scored two goals for the national team in the 2022 AFF Championship tournament, against Brunei and Philippines.

On 25 March 2023, Dendy scored a goal against Burundi in a 3–1 win in a friendly match.

== Career statistics ==
=== Club ===
As of match played 27 September 2026

Club	Season	League			Cup (Note: Includes Piala Indonesia)		Continental		Other (Note: Appearances in Indonesia President's Cup)		Total	
Club	Season	Division	Apps	Goals	Apps	Goals	Apps	Goals	Apps	Goals	Apps	Goals
Persela Lamongan	2016	ISC A	32	7	0	0	–		0	0	32	7
Bhayangkara	2017	Liga 1	21	2	0	0	–		0	0	21	2
Bhayangkara	2018	Liga 1	12	0	0	0	–		0	0	12	0
Bhayangkara	2019	Liga 1	25	1	3	1	–		4	2	32	4
Bhayangkara	2020	Liga 1	2	0	0	0	–		0	0	2	0
Bhayangkara	2021–22	Liga 1	34	5	0	0	–		3 (Note: Appearances in Menpora Cup)	0	37	5
Bhayangkara	2022–23	Liga 1	26	9	0	0	–		4	0	30	9
Bhayangkara	2023–24	Liga 1	31	2	0	0	–		0	0	31	2
Bhayangkara	2024–25	Liga 2	21	5	0	0	–		0	0	21	5
Bhayangkara	2025–26	Super League	27	6	0	0	–		0	0	27	6
Bhayangkara	Total		199	30	3	1	0	0	11	2	213	33
Persela Lamongan (loan)	2018	Liga 1	16	9	0	0	–		0	0	16	9
Persela Lamongan	2026–27	Championship	3	1	0	0	–		0	0	3	1
Career total			240	44	3	1	0	0	17	2	260	47

=== International ===
As of match played 16 November 2023

Appearances and goals by national team and year
National team	Year	Apps	Goals
Indonesia	2022	5	2
Indonesia	2023	11	3
Indonesia	2024	1	0
Total		17	5

As of match played 16 November 2023
Scores and results list Indonesia's goal tally first, score column indicates score after each Dendy goal.

List of international goals scored by Dendy Sulistyawan
No.	Date	Venue	Cap	Opponent	Score	Result	Competition
1	27 September 2022	Pakansari Stadium, Bogor, Indonesia	2	Curaçao	2–1	2–1	Friendly
2	26 December 2022	Kuala Lumpur Stadium, Kuala Lumpur, Malaysia	4	Brunei	2–0	7–0	2022 AFF Championship
3	2 January 2023	Rizal Memorial Stadium, Manila, Philippines	6	Philippines	1–0	2–1	2022 AFF Championship
4	25 March 2023	Patriot Chandrabhaga Stadium, Bekasi, Indonesia	9	Burundi	2–0	3–1	Friendly
5	8 September 2023	Gelora Bung Tomo Stadium, Surabaya, Indonesia	11	Turkmenistan	1–0	2–0	Friendly

== Honours ==
=== Club ===
Bhayangkara

- Liga 1: 2017
- Liga 2 runner-up: 2024–25
