= Sebastian Rasmussen =

Association footballer

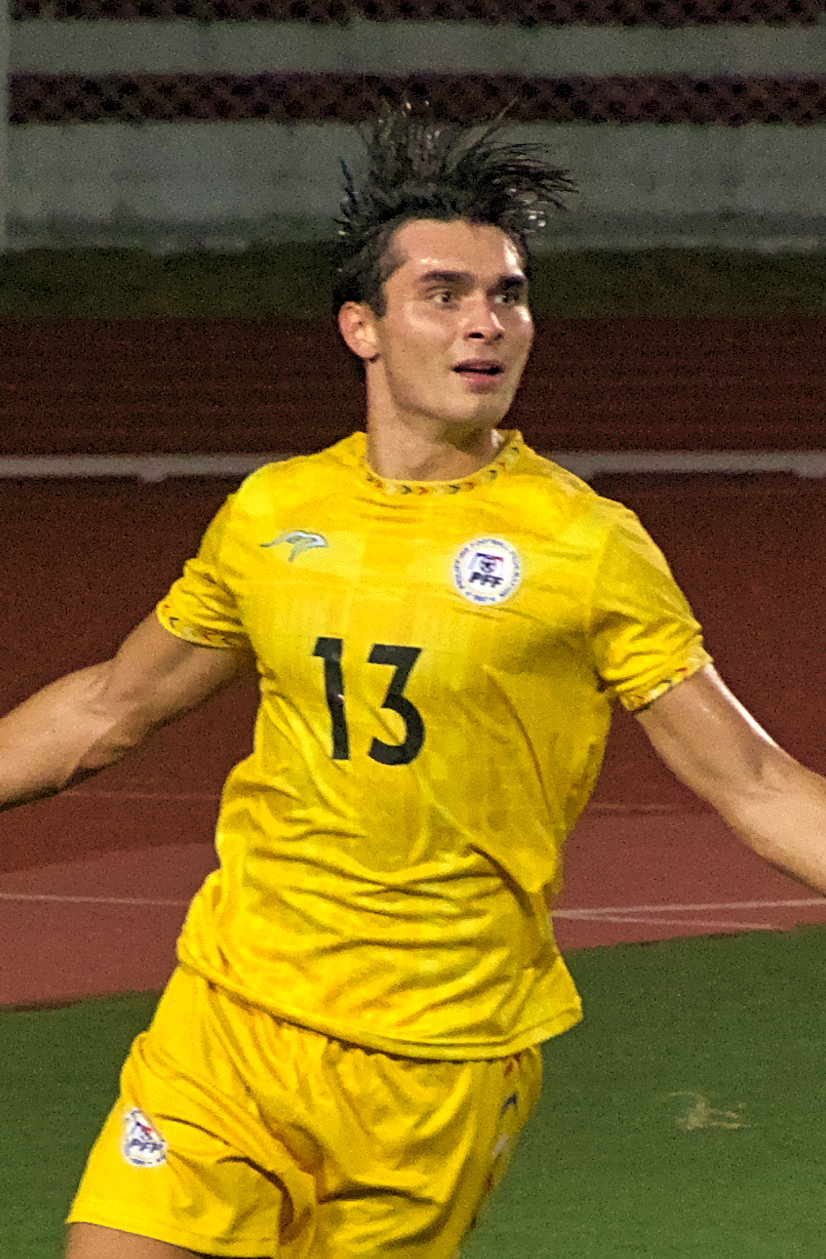
- Rasmussen playing for Philippines in 2023

Personal information
- Full name: Jens Sebastian Beraque Rasmussen
- Date of birth: 17 June 2002 (age 24)
- Place of birth: Aarhus, Denmark
- Height: 1.92 m (6 ft 4 in)
- Position: Forward

Team information
- Current team: Hobro
- Number: 15

Youth career
- 2007–2010: Havndal Udbyneder IF
- 2010–2011: Randers
- 2011–2012: Hadsund BK
- 2012–2013: AaB
- 2013–2019: Randers
- 2019–2021: AGF

Senior career*
Years	Team	Apps	(Gls)
2021–2022	Randers Freja		
2023	Hobro II		
2023–	Hobro	4	(0)

International career^{‡}
2021	Philippines U23	3	(0)
2022–	Philippines	16	(6)
- * Club domestic league appearances and goals as of 3 November 2023 ‡ National team caps and goals as of 29 September 2026

Jens Sebastian Beraque Rasmussen (born 17 June 2002) is a professional footballer who plays as a forward for Danish 1st Division club Hobro. Born in Denmark, he plays for the Philippines national team.

== Club career ==
A former youth academy player of Randers, Rasmussen joined AGF in 2019. He returned to Randers in 2021 and became the part of reserve team Randers Freja.

In July 2023, after playing half a season for the second team, Rasmussen was promoted to the first team of Hobro.

== International career ==
In October 2021, Rasmussen was called up to the Philippines under-23 team for 2022 AFC U-23 Asian Cup qualification matches.

In November 2022, Rasmussen was named in the Philippines national team squad for the 2022 AFF Championship. On 23 December 2022, he made his debut by scoring two goals and providing an assist in a 5–1 win against Brunei. In September 2026, he was named in the squad for the 2026 FIFA ASEAN Cup.

== Personal life ==
Rasmussen was born in Denmark to a Danish father and a Filipino mother.

== Career statistics ==
=== International ===
As of match played 29 September 2026

Appearances and goals by national team and year
National team	Year	Apps	Goals
Philippines	2022	2	2
Philippines	2023	3	2
Philippines	2024	3	0
Philippines	2025	3	0
Philippines	2026	5	2
Total		16	6

Scores and results list Philippines' goal tally first, score column indicates score after each Rasmussen goal.

List of international goals scored by Sebastian Rasmussen
No.	Date	Venue	Opponent	Score	Result	Competition
1	23 December 2022	Rizal Memorial Stadium, Manila, Philippines	Brunei	4–0	5–1	2022 AFF Championship
2	23 December 2022	Rizal Memorial Stadium, Manila, Philippines	Brunei	5–1	5–1	2022 AFF Championship
3	2 January 2023	Rizal Memorial Stadium, Manila, Philippines	Indonesia	1–2	1–2	2022 AFF Championship
4	12 September 2023	Rizal Memorial Stadium, Manila, Philippines	Afghanistan	1–1	2–1	Friendly
5	9 June 2026	Rizal Memorial Stadium, Manila, Philippines	Myanmar	3–0	5–1	Friendly
6	9 June 2026	Rizal Memorial Stadium, Manila, Philippines	Myanmar	5–1	5–1	Friendly
