= 2016 Blaublitz Akita season =

Blaublitz Akita
2016 season
- Chairman: Kosuke Iwase
- Manager: Shuichi Mase
- Stadium: Akigin Stadium; Akita Yabase Athletic Field
- J3 League: 4th
- Emperor's Cup: Second round
- Top goalscorer: Tomohiro Tanaka (8)
- Highest home attendance: 5,371
- Lowest home attendance: 1,339
- Average home league attendance: 2,425 (+21.4%)
Home colours	Away colours

2016 Blaublitz Akita season. The annual club slogan was "躍".

== Squad ==
As of 2016.

Note: Flags indicate national team as defined under FIFA eligibility rules; some limited exceptions apply. Players may hold more than one non-FIFA nationality.

No.	Pos.	Nation	Player
1	GK	JPN	Masataka Nomura
3	DF	KOR	Han Ho-gang
4	DF	JPN	Shuhei Fukai
5	DF	JPN	Shuhei Hotta
6	MF	JPN	Keita Hidaka
7	MF	JPN	Kyohei Maeyama
8	MF	JPN	Tatsuya Kumagai
9	FW	KOR	Go Daimu
10	FW	BRA	Caio
11	MF	JPN	Ken Hisatomi
13	MF	JPN	Shohei Shinzato
14	MF	JPN	Kazuhiro Kawata
15	MF	JPN	Yuki Hatanaka

No.	Pos.	Nation	Player
16	FW	JPN	Masaya Yuma
17	FW	JPN	Toshiki Sakai
18	MF	JPN	Naoki Hatada
20	MF	JPN	Takuma Aoshima
21	GK	JPN	Takuya Matsumoto
23	GK	JPN	Fumiya Oishi
25	MF	JPN	Teruyoshi Ito
29	FW	JPN	Tomohiro Tanaka
32	DF	JPN	Takahiro Urashima
33	FW	JPN	Takunosuke Funakawa
36	MF	JPN	Ryoto Higa
43	DF	JPN	Kohei Shimoda

== J3 League ==
Match	Date	Team	Score	Team	Venue	Attendance
1	2016.03.13	Fukushima United FC	1-1	Blaublitz Akita	Toho Stadium	2,136
2	2016.03.20	Gainare Tottori	1-1	Blaublitz Akita	Tottori Bank Bird Stadium	2,645
3	2016.04.03	Blaublitz Akita	1-0	FC Tokyo U-23	Akigin Stadium	2,491
4	2016.04.10	YSCC Yokohama	1-2	Blaublitz Akita	NHK Spring Mitsuzawa Football Stadium	805
5	2016.04.17	Blaublitz Akita	2-1	Tochigi SC	Akigin Stadium	1,339
6	2016.04.24	Grulla Morioka	1-1	Blaublitz Akita	Iwagin Stadium	1,076
7	2016.05.01	Blaublitz Akita	1-0	Gamba Osaka U-23	Akigin Stadium	1,751
8	2016.05.08	SC Sagamihara	2-2	Blaublitz Akita	Sagamihara Gion Stadium	4,873
9	2016.05.15	Blaublitz Akita	1-0	Kataller Toyama	Akita Yabase Athletic Field	1,946
10	2016.05.22	Blaublitz Akita	1-1	AC Nagano Parceiro	Akigin Stadium	2,229
11	2016.05.29	FC Ryukyu	1-1	Blaublitz Akita	Okinawa Athletic Park Stadium	1,347
12	2016.06.12	Blaublitz Akita	1-3	Kagoshima United FC	Akigin Stadium	3,681
13	2016.06.19	Fujieda MYFC	2-1	Blaublitz Akita	Fujieda Soccer Stadium	940
14	2016.06.26	Oita Trinita	1-0	Blaublitz Akita	Oita Bank Dome	6,733
15	2016.07.03	Blaublitz Akita	1-1	Cerezo Osaka U-23	Akigin Stadium	2,251
16	2016.07.10	AC Nagano Parceiro	1-0	Blaublitz Akita	Minami Nagano Sports Park Stadium	4,810
17	2016.07.16	Blaublitz Akita	3-0	Gainare Tottori	Akigin Stadium	1,702
18	2016.07.24	Tochigi SC	1-0	Blaublitz Akita	Tochigi Green Stadium	8,586
19	2016.07.31	Blaublitz Akita	1-0	Fujieda MYFC	Akigin Stadium	2,002
20	2016.08.07	Kataller Toyama	0-1	Blaublitz Akita	Toyama Stadium	3,263
21	2016.09.10	Blaublitz Akita	3-0	YSCC Yokohama	Akigin Stadium	1,781
22	2016.09.19	FC Tokyo U-23	1-0	Blaublitz Akita	Ajinomoto Stadium	3,236
23	2016.09.24	Blaublitz Akita	2-1	Fukushima United FC	Akigin Stadium	2,318
24	2016.10.02	Blaublitz Akita	2-0	Grulla Morioka	Akigin Stadium	3,380
25	2016.10.16	Kagoshima United FC	1-0	Blaublitz Akita	Kagoshima Kamoike Stadium	2,393
26	2016.10.22	Cerezo Osaka U-23	1-2	Blaublitz Akita	Kincho Stadium	771
27	2016.10.30	Blaublitz Akita	0-1	Oita Trinita	Akigin Stadium	1,931
28	2016.11.06	Blaublitz Akita	2-1	SC Sagamihara	Akita Yabase Athletic Field	5,371
29	2016.11.13	Gamba Osaka U-23	2-2	Blaublitz Akita	Suita City Football Stadium	4,203
30	2016.11.20	Blaublitz Akita	2-0	FC Ryukyu	Akigin Stadium	2,198

=== Standings ===
Pos	Team	Pld	W	D	L	GF	GA	GD	Pts	Qualification or relegation
1	Oita Trinita (C, P)	30	19	4	7	50	24	+26	61	Promotion to 2017 J2 League
2	Tochigi SC	30	17	8	5	38	20	+18	59	Qualification to J2 promotion playoffs (Note: Only teams that hold a J2 license are eligible for promotion.)
3	Nagano Parceiro	30	15	7	8	33	22	+11	52	
4	Blaublitz Akita	30	14	8	8	37	26	+11	50	
5	Kagoshima United	30	15	5	10	39	29	+10	50	
6	Kataller Toyama	30	13	10	7	37	27	+10	49	
7	Fujieda MYFC	30	14	3	13	48	42	+6	45	
8	FC Ryukyu	30	12	8	10	46	46	0	44	
9	Gamba Osaka U-23	30	10	8	12	42	41	+1	38	
10	FC Tokyo U-23	30	9	9	12	32	31	+1	36	
11	SC Sagamihara	30	9	8	13	29	46	−17	35	
12	Cerezo Osaka U-23	30	8	8	14	38	47	−9	32	
13	Grulla Morioka	30	6	12	12	43	47	−4	30	
14	Fukushima United	30	7	9	14	35	44	−9	30	
15	Gainare Tottori	30	8	6	16	30	47	−17	30	
16	YSCC Yokohama	30	5	5	20	15	51	−36	20	

Updated to match(es) played on 20 November 2016. Source: 2016 MEIJI YASUDA J3 LEAGUE League table
Rules for classification: 1) Points; 2) Goal difference; 3) Goals scored; 4th) head-to-head results; 5th) disciplinary points; 6th) draw
(C) Champions; (P) Promoted

== Emperor's Cup ==
21 August 2016 Akita Prefecture Qualifying Final	Blaublitz Akita	5–0	Saruta Kōgyō S.C. [tl]	Akigin Stadium
14:04	Go 36', 41'; Urashima 81'; Yuma 86'; Fukai 93'	Report		Attendance: 457

27 August 2016	Blaublitz Akita	2–0	Vanraure Hachinohe	Akita
13:00	Urashima 12'; Go 59'	Report		Stadium: Akigin Stadium; Attendance: 603; Referee: Kazuyoshi Karashima

3 September 2016	Kawasaki Frontale	3–1	Blaublitz Akita	Kawasaki
19:00	Eduardo 67'; Ōkubo 77'; Tasaka 82'	Report	Maeyama 28'	Stadium: Todoroki Athletics Stadium; Attendance: 5,088; Referee: Toru Kakinuma

== Other games ==
7 February 2016	Blaublitz Akita	1–1	Vanraure Hachinohe	Sendai University
11:30		Report; Report

15 February 2016	Gamba Osaka	4–2	Blaublitz Akita	Gamba#2 Ground
13:30		Report	Maeyama; Kawata

19 February 2016	Kochi United SC	4–0	Blaublitz Akita	Haruno Ball Game Ground
10:00		Report

24 February 2016	Cerezo Osaka U-23	0–3	Blaublitz Akita	Cerezo Osaka Yanmar Ground
12:30		Report

26 February 2016	Ryutsu Keizai University	1–3	Blaublitz Akita	Ryutsu Keizai University
13:00		Report

6 March 2016	Blaublitz Akita	3–0	Blancdieu Hirosaki FC	TDK Akita General Sports Center
13:00		Report

9 March 2016	Blaublitz Akita	15–1	North Asia University	Space Project Dream Field
11:00		Report

27 March 2016	Blaublitz Akita	2–1	Japan Soccer College	Space Project Dream Field
10:00		Report

30 March 2016	Blaublitz Akita	3–1	Aomori Yamada High	Space Project Dream Field
11:00		Report

27 April 2016	Montedio Yamagata	0–1	Blaublitz Akita	#3 Sports Square
13:00		Report	Maeyama

4 May 2016	Blaublitz Akita	3–0	Iwaki FC	Akigin Stadium
11:00		Report

4 June 2016	Blaublitz Akita	2–2	Grulla Morioka	TDK Akita General Sports Center
11:00		Report

29 June 2016	Blaublitz Akita	2–1	Akita Prefecture Kokutai	Nishime Country Park Soccer Field
11:00		Report

20 July 2016	Blaublitz Akita	7–1	Akita Prefecture Kokutai	Akigin Stadium
11:00		Report

27 July 2016	Blaublitz Akita	8–0	Japan Soccer College	Nikaho Green Field
12:00		Report

10 August 2016	Blaublitz Akita	14–0	Akita Commercial High	Nishime Country Park Soccer Field
12:00		Report

17 August 2016	Blaublitz Akita	4–2	Fuji University	Yabase Athletic Field
14:30		Report

30 August 2016	Blaublitz Akita	7–0	ReinMeer Aomori	Space Project Dream Field
12:00		Report

6 September 2016	Blaublitz Akita	3–4	Sendai University	Space Project Dream Field
12:00		Report

11 September 2016	Vegalta Sendai	2–0	Blaublitz Akita	Vegalta Murasakiyama Soccer Field
14:00		Report

14 September 2016	Blaublitz Akita	1–0	Japan Soccer College	Health Square
12:00		Report

9 October 2016	Albirex Niigata	2–2	Blaublitz Akita	Niigata Seiro Sports Center
14:00		Report	Sakai; Sakai

12 October 2016	Blaublitz Akita	4–1	Aomori Yamada High	Health Square
12:00		Report

== Gallery ==
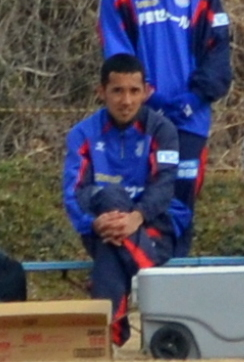
Ito
