= Saruta Kōgyō S.C. =

Japanese football club

Saruta Kogyo Soccer Club Saruta Industries SC 猿田興業サッカー部
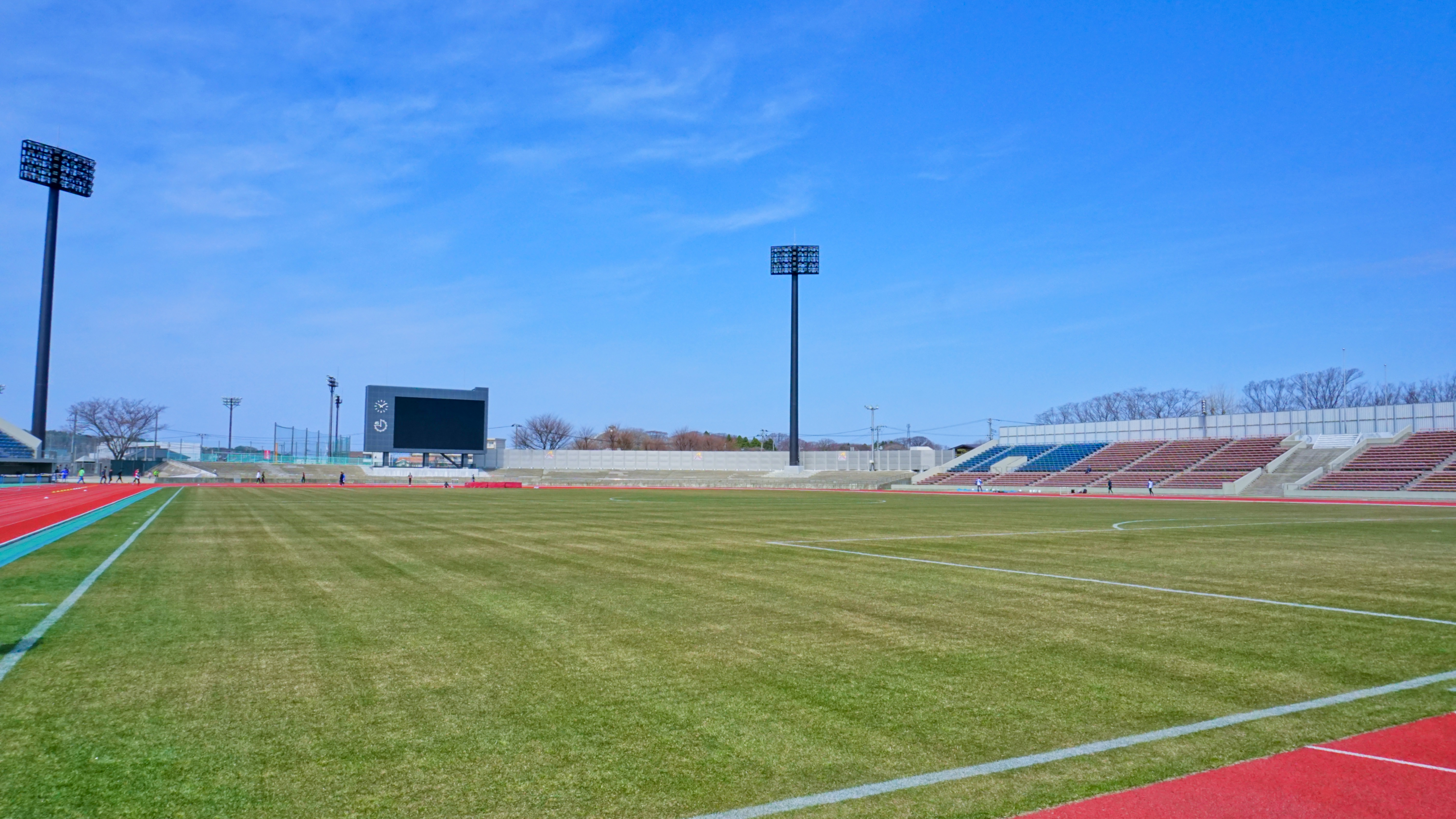
- Full name: Saruta Kogyo Soccer Club
- Founded: 1970; 56 years ago
- Stadium: Soyu Stadium; Akita Prefectural Central Park Playing Field; Space Project Field; Akita Prefecture Football Centre
- Capacity: 20,125; 16,500; 730
- Chairman: Ikuma Nakamura
- Manager: Tomokazu Saito
- League: Tohoku Soccer League
- 2020: 10th
- Website: saruta.co.jp/soccer/
| Home colours | Away colours |

Saruta Kogyo Headquarters
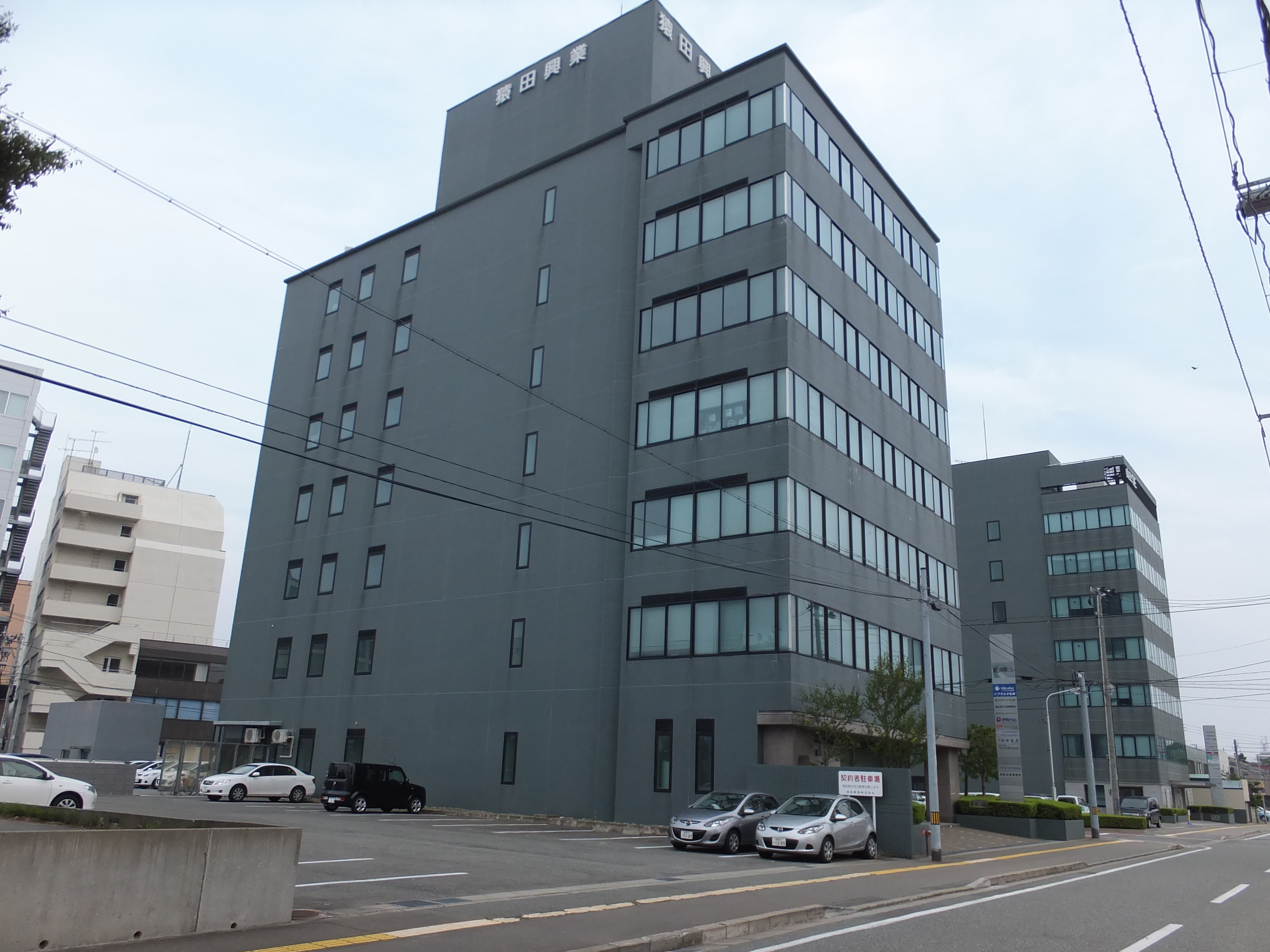
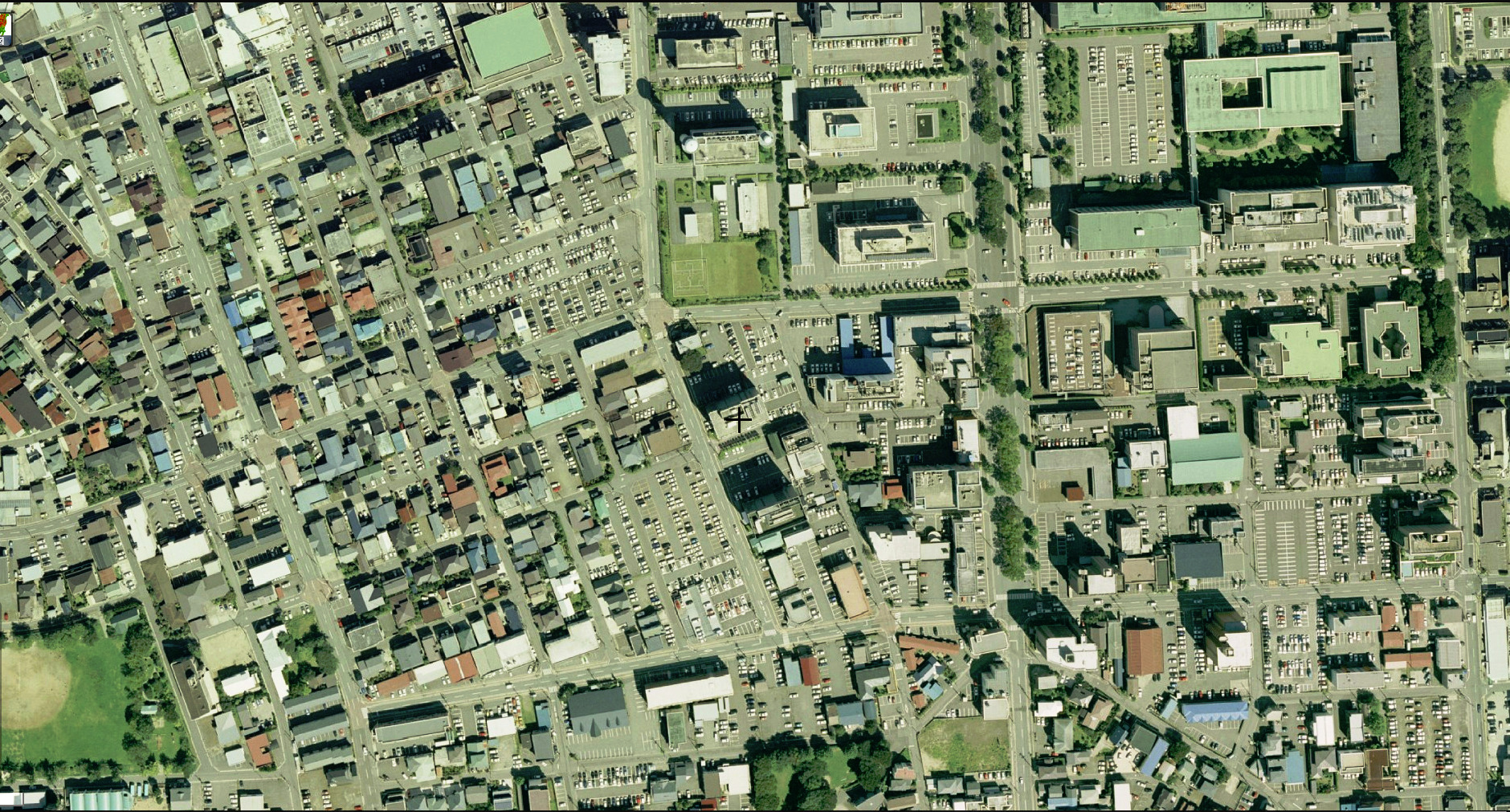

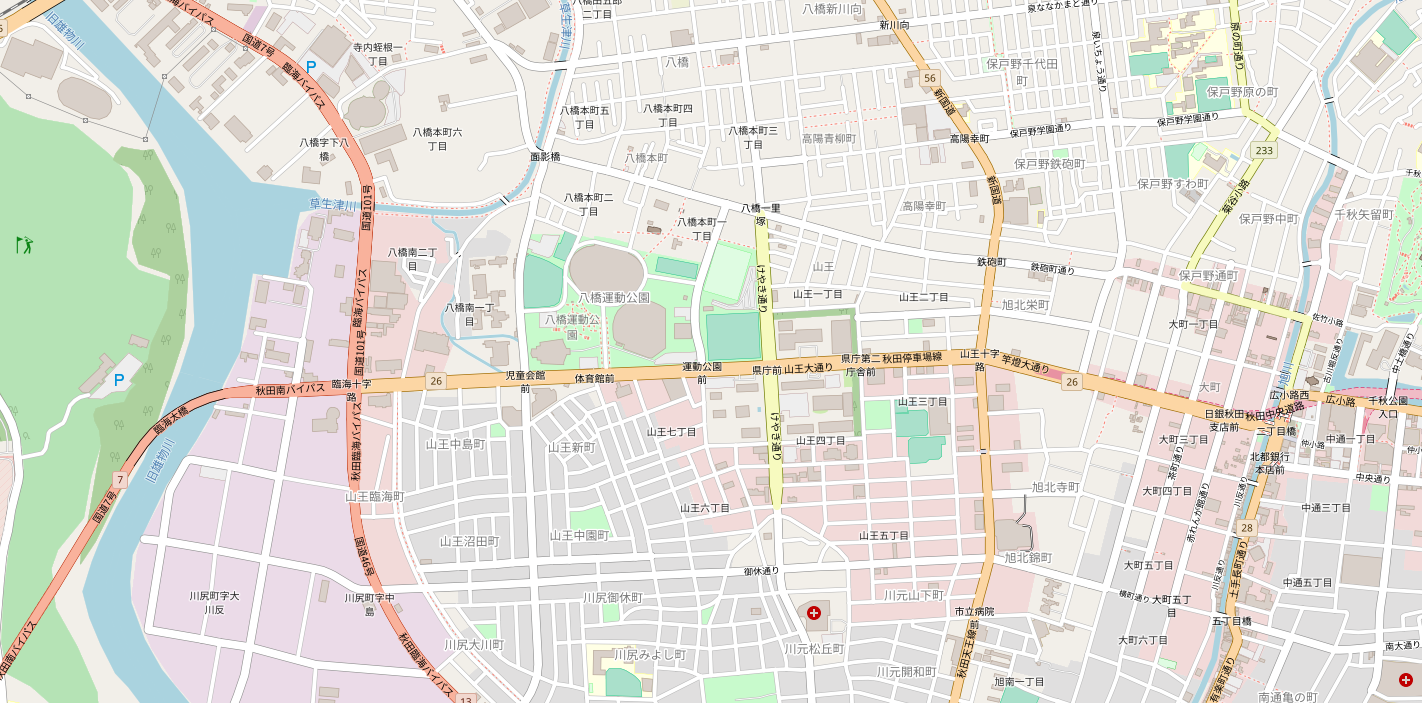
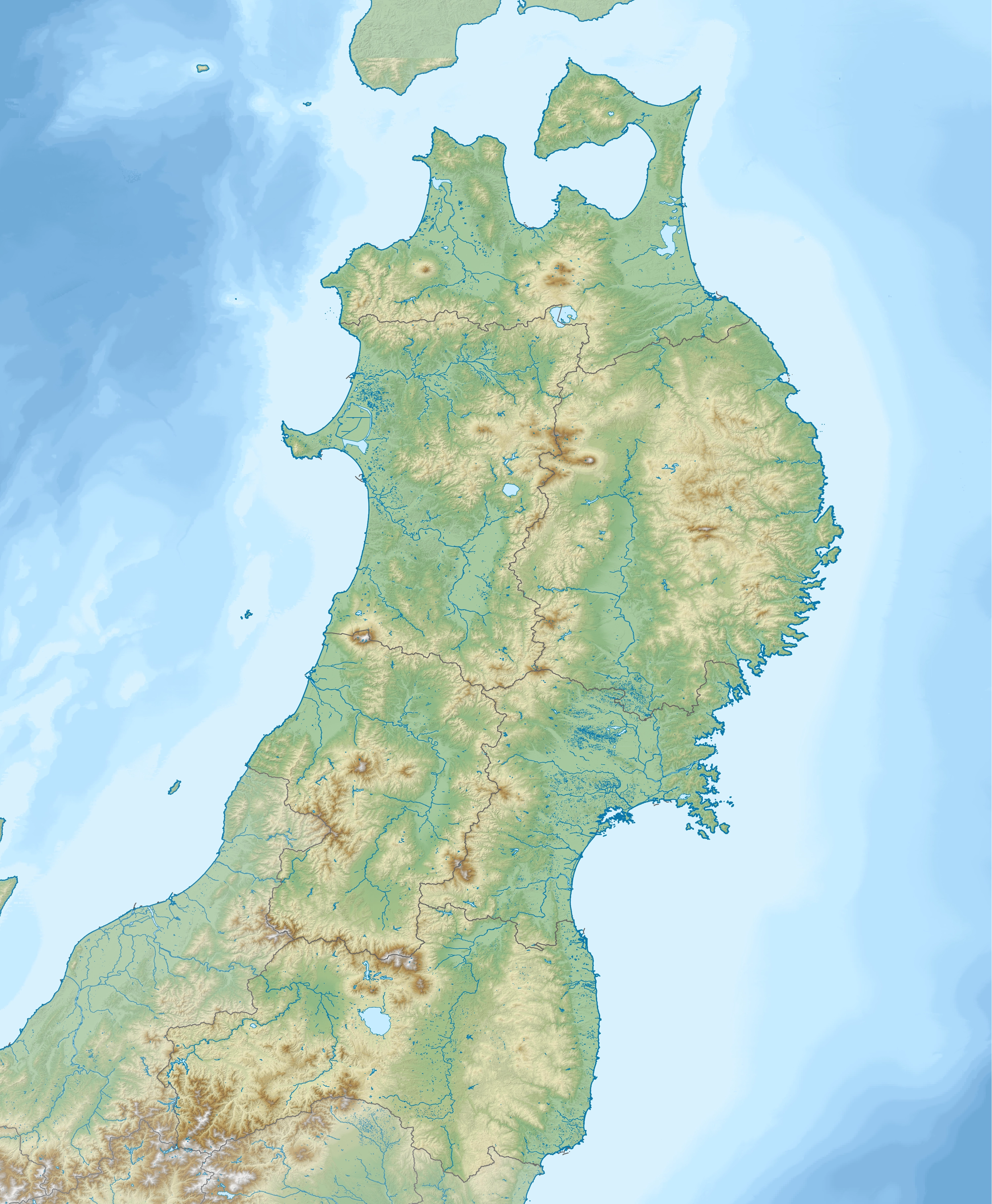
- Location within Akita, Akita Location within Akita Prefecture Location within Tohoku, Japan Location within Japan

General information
- Location: 010-0951, Saruta Kogyo Building 3F, Sanno 6–10–9, Akitashi, Japan
- Coordinates: 39°42′59.5″N 140°05′58.6″E
- Opened: July 1993

Technical details
- Size: 3,257.89m²
- Floor count: 7+B1
- Lifts/elevators: 2
- Grounds: 1,148.73m²

Design and construction
- Architecture firm: Shimizu Corporation
- Main contractor: Shimizu Corporation

Saruta Kogyo Co., Ltd.
- Native name: 猿田興業株式会社
- Romanized name: Saruta Kogyo Kabushigaisha
- Industry: Firefighting disaster prevention equipments, paper manufacturing material, recycling, wooden pallets and real estate
- Founded: December 1, 1960; 65 years ago in Akita, Japan
- Founder: Miyoji Saruta
- Headquarters: Akita City, Japan
- Area served: Akita Prefecture
- Revenue: JPY 4 billion
- Owner: Tomohisa Saruta
- Number of employees: 280

Saruta Kogyo Soccer Club (猿田興業サッカー部, Saruta Kogyo Soccer Club) is a Japanese football club based in Akita, the capital city of Akita Prefecture. They play in the Tohoku Soccer League, which is part of Japanese Regional Leagues. Their team colour is blue and they won the Emperor's Cup Akita Prefectural title for two consecutive seasons.

== History ==
The club based in Akita, Akita, was founded in 1970. They won the Akita Prefecture League in 2011 and 2013. The team finished first place in the Tohoku Soccer League Division 2 North twice.

== Company profile ==
Saruta Kogyo Co., Ltd. is a company that specializes in firefighting disaster prevention equipments, paper manufacturing material, recycling, wooden pallets and real estate.

== Current squad ==
As of 23 August 2023.

Note: Flags indicate national team as defined under FIFA eligibility rules; some limited exceptions apply. Players may hold more than one non-FIFA nationality.

| No. | Pos. | Nation | Player |
|---|---|---|---|
| 1 | GK | JPN | Kenta Ito |
| 4 | DF | JPN | Yo Kinouchi |
| 5 | MF | JPN | Toshiki Funaki |
| 6 | FW | JPN | Takahiro Meguro |
| 7 | MF | JPN | Riku Inoue |
| 8 | FW | JPN | Ayu Saito |
| 9 | DF | JPN | Yuki Ishii |
| 10 | MF | JPN | Obu Horii |
| 11 | MF | JPN | Tomoaki Kanaya |
| 12 | GK | JPN | Taito Nagai |
| 13 | MF | JPN | Tomohiro Igarashi |

| No. | Pos. | Nation | Player |
|---|---|---|---|
| 14 | DF | JPN | Takuto Kumagai |
| 16 | MF | JPN | Yuya Sato |
| 17 | FW | JPN | Gakuto Futagi |
| 18 | DF | JPN | Kazunari Sugawara |
| 19 | DF | JPN | Ryo Shimomura |
| 20 | FW | JPN | Tomokazu Saito |
| 22 | DF | JPN | Yusuke Yotsuya |
| 23 | DF | JPN | Takuya Hayashi |
| 25 | MF | JPN | Taiyo Meguro |
| 26 | MF | JPN | Ryuga Ono |

== League record ==
| Champions | Runners-up | Third place | Promoted | Relegated |

| Season | League | League Position | GP | W | D | L | F | A | GD | Pts | Emperor's Cup | Shakaijin Cup |
|---|---|---|---|---|---|---|---|---|---|---|---|---|
| 2006 | Akita Prefecture A1 | 2nd | | | | | | | | | Did not qualify | Did not qualify |
| 2007 | Tohoku D2N | 5th | 14 | 6 | 1 | 7 | 31 | 31 | 0 | 19 | Did not qualify | Did not qualify |
| 2008 | Tohoku D2N | 8th | 14 | 1 | 3 | 10 | 11 | 28 | −17 | 9 | Did not qualify | Did not qualify |
| 2009 | Akita Prefecture A1 | 3rd | 10 | 6 | 1 | 3 | 27 | 8 | 19 | 19 | Did not qualify | Did not qualify |
| 2010 | Akita Prefecture A1 | 2nd | 6 | 3 | 1 | 2 | 13 | 12 | 1 | 10 | Did not qualify | Did not qualify |
| 2011 | Akita Prefecture A1 | 1st | 7 | 5 | 2 | 0 | 42 | 6 | 36 | 17 | Did not qualify | Did not qualify |
| 2012 | Akita Prefecture A1 | 2nd | 3 | 2 | 0 | 1 | 24 | 5 | 19 | 6 | Did not qualify | Did not qualify |
| 2013 | Akita Prefecture A1 | 1st | 7 | 6 | 1 | 0 | 53 | 3 | 50 | 19 | Did not qualify | Did not qualify |
| 2014 | Tohoku D2 North | 2nd | 18 | 13 | 3 | 2 | 59 | 15 | 44 | 42 | Did not qualify | Did not qualify |
| 2015 | Tohoku D2 North | 1st | 18 | 12 | 3 | 3 | 51 | 24 | 27 | 39 | Did not qualify | Did not qualify |
| 2016 | Tohoku 1 | 9th | 18 | 6 | 1 | 11 | 38 | 44 | −6 | 19 | Did not qualify | Did not qualify |
| 2017 | Tohoku D2 North | 2nd | 18 | 13 | 0 | 5 | 71 | 35 | 36 | 39 | Did not qualify | Did not qualify |
| 2018 | Tohoku D2 North | 1st | 18 | 15 | 2 | 1 | 88 | 13 | 75 | 47 | Did not qualify | Did not qualify |
| 2019 | Tohoku 1 | 9th | 18 | 4 | 2 | 12 | 30 | 51 | −21 | 14 | Did not qualify | Did not qualify |
| 2020 | Tohoku 1 | 10th | 9 | 0 | 2 | 7 | 5 | 34 | −29 | 2 | 1st round | Did not qualify |
| 2021 | Tohoku 1 | 11th | 5 | 1 | 1 | 3 | 13 | 25 | -12 | 4 | 1st round | Did not qualify |
| 2022 | Tohoku 1 | 11th | 16 | 1 | 1 | 14 | 15 | 73 | -58 | 4 | Did not qualify | Did not qualify |
| 2023 | Tohoku D2 North | 6th | 13 | 7 | 3 | 3 | 48 | 18 | 30 | 24 | Did not qualify | Did not qualify |
| 2024 | Tohoku D2 North | 5th | 16 | 6 | 2 | 8 | 40 | 27 | 13 | 26 | 1st round | Did not qualify |
| 2025 | Tohoku D2 North | 5th | 14 | 4 | 5 | 5 | 24 | 32 | -8 | 17 | Did not qualify | Did not qualify |
| 2026 | Tohoku D2 North | TBD | 14 | | | | | | | | TBD | Did not qualify |

== Honours ==
Saruta Kōgyō S.C. honours
| Honour | No. | Years |
|---|---|---|
| Akita Prefecture Soccer League | 2 | 2011, 2013 |
| Tohoku Soccer League Division 2 North | 2 | 2015, 2018 |
| Akita Prefectural Soccer Championship Emperor's Cup Prefectural Qualifiers | 3 | 2020, 2021, 2024 |

== Emperor's Cup Records ==
| 16 September 2020 1 | Sony Sendai FC | 3–0 | Saruta Kogyo | Sendai, Miyagi |
| 19:00 | Akimoto 45'; Hirata 61'; Suzuki 89' | report report | | Stadium: Yurtec Stadium Sendai; Attendance: 203; Referee: Tomokazu Sato |

| 23 May 2021 1 | Vanraure Hachinohe | 13–0 | Saruta Kogyo (Akita tournament winner) | Hachinohe, Aomori |
| 13:00 JST | Shimada 2' 29'; Kamigata 4' 20'; Tsuboi 11'; Kuroishi 26'; Aida 47' 56' 82'; Harayama 59'; Akiyoshi 63' 89'; Oka 71' | report Report | | Stadium: Prifoods Stadium; Attendance: 379; Referee: Kei Suzuki |

=== Akita Prefecture Qualifying Round ===
| 21 August 2016 Akita Prefecture Qualifying Final | Blaublitz Akita | 5–0 | Saruta Kōgyō S.C. | Akigin Stadium |
| 14:04 | Go 36', 41'; Urashima 81'; Yuma 86'; Fukai 93' | Report | | Attendance: 457 |

| 22 April 2018 Akita Prefecture Qualifying Final | Blaublitz Akita | 1–0 | Saruta Kōgyō S.C. | Akigin Stadium |
| 14:00 | Yoshihira 29' | Report | | Attendance: 602 |

| 21 April 2019 Akita Prefecture Qualifying Final | Blaublitz Akita | 4–0 | Saruta Kōgyō S.C. | Soyu Stadium |
| 13:00 | Wada 8' own goal 35'; Nakashima 74', 80' | Report | | Attendance: 528 |

== Tohoku Soccer League records ==
=== 2007 Tohoku D2 North ===
| 10 June 2007 | Mizusawa SC | 2–1 | Saruta Kogyo | Oshu Fureai Koen |
| 13:00 JST |

| 6 May 2007 | FC Akita Cambiare | 3–0 | Saruta Kogyo | BTO Ground |
| 14:00 JST |

| 13 May 2007 | Vanraure Hachinohe | 1–5 | Saruta Kogyo | Nango Athletic Stadium |
| 11:00 JST |

| 20 May 2007 | Saruta Kogyo | 1–2 | Tono Club | TDK Sports Centre |
| 13:00 JST |

| 27 May 2007 | Saruta Kogyo | 3–1 | Omiya SC | Misato, Akita |
| 13:00 JST | | | | Stadium: Odaino Square |

| 12 June 2007 | Hokuto Bank SC | 1–5 | Saruta Kogyo | Spopa Kawabe |
| 11:00 JST |

| 5 August 2007 | Saruta Kogyo | 5–3 | Fuji Club 2003 | Spopa Kawabe |
| 13:00 JST |

| 1 July 2007 | Saruta Kogyo | 1–3 | Mizusawa SC | Spopa Kawabe |
| 11:00 JST |

| 8 July 2007 | Saruta Kogyo | 1–7 | FC Akita Cambiare | Spopa Kawabe |
| 13:00 JST |

| 9 September 2007 | Saruta Kogyo | 2–2 | Vanraure Hachinohe | Omori, Akita |
| 13:00 JST |

| 16 September 2007 | Tono Club | 2–1 | Saruta Kogyo | Tono Athletic Stadium |
| 13:00 JST |

| 7 October 2007 | Omiya SC | 1–2 | Saruta Kogyo |
| 13:00 JST |

| 14 October 2007 | Saruta Kogyo | 2–0 | Hokuto Bank SC | Omori, Akita |
| 13:00 JST |

| 21 October 2007 | Fuji Club 2003 | 3–2 | Saruta Kogyo | Hanamaki Camp |
| 13:00 JST |

Source Source

=== 2008 Tohoku D2 North ===
| 6 July 2008 | Saruta Kogyo | 1–2 | Mizusawa SC | Akita Central Park |
| 13:00 JST |

| 13 July 2008 | FC Shiwa | 1–1 | Saruta Kogyo | Fureai Park |
| 13:30 JST |

| 11 May 2008 | Saruta Kogyo | 0–2 | Morioka Zebra | Azuma Multi-purpose |
| 13:30 JST |

| 18 May 2008 | Tono Club | 2–1 | Saruta Kogyo | Tono Athletic Stadium |
| 13:30 JST |

| 25 May 2008 | Saruta Kogyo | 0–2 | Japan Steel Kamaishi | Yabase Athletic Stadium |
| 11:00 JST |

| 1 June 2008 | Vanraure Hachinohe | 1–1 | Saruta Kogyo | Nango Athletic Stadium |
| 13:00 JST |

| 29 June 2008 | Saruta Kogyo | 1–3 | Fuji Club 2003 | TDK Sports Centre |
| 11:00 JST |

| 14 September 2008 | Mizusawa SC | 0–1 | Saruta Kogyo | Oshu Sakura Zutsumi |
| 13:00 JST |

| 12 October 2008 | Fuji Club 2003 | 2–0 | Saruta Kogyo | Hanamaki Camp |
| 11:00 JST |

| 5 October 2008 | Saruta Kogyo | 1–3 | Vanraure Hachinohe | Yabase Athletic Stadium |
| 13:00 JST |

| 21 September 2008 | Japan Steel Kamaishi | 2–1 | Saruta Kogyo | Tono Athletic Stadium |
| 13:00 JST |

| 7 September 2008 | Saruta Kogyo | 2–2 | Tono Club | Akita Central Park |
| 13:00 JST |

| 19 October 2008 | Saruta Kogyo | 4–0 | FC Shiwa | Akita Central Park |
| 13:00 JST |

| 23 September 2008 | Morioka Zebra | 3–1 | Saruta Kogyo | Fuji University Ground |
| 12:00 JST |

source source

=== 2014 Tohoku D2 North ===
| 13 April 2014 | Saruta Kogyo | 3–3 | Blancdieu Hirosaki | Space Project Field |
| 11:00 JST |

| 27 April 2014 | Saruta Kogyo | 5–1 | Omiya SC | Space Project Field |
| 11:00 JST |

| 11 May 2014 | Iwate SC | 0–11 | Saruta Kogyo | Iwate, Iwate |
| 12:00 JST | | | | Stadium: Iwate Town General Sports Park |

| 18 May 2014 | Akita University Medical FC | 0–3 | Saruta Kogyo | Akigin Stadium |
| 11:00 JST |

| 25 May 2014 | Oirase FC | 1–4 | Saruta Kogyo | Oirase Ginkgo Park |
| 13:00 JST |

| 1 June 2014 | Saruta Kogyo | 1–1 | FC Fuji 08 | Akita Prefectural Central Park |
| 11:00 JST |

| 6 July 2014 | Saruta Kogyo | 2–0 | Mizusawa SC | Space Project Field |
| 13:00 JST |

| 13 July 2014 | Japan Steel Kamaishi | 2–3 | Saruta Kogyo | Kamaishi Playing Field |
| 13:00 JST |

| 20 July 2014 | TDK Shinwakai | 1–0 | Saruta Kogyo | Nikaho Green Field |
| 10:00 JST |

| 27 July 2014 | Blancdieu Hirosaki | 1–0 | Saruta Kogyo | Hirosaki Athletic Stadium |
| 14:00 JST |

| 24 August 2014 | Omiya SC | 0–6 | Saruta Kogyo | Tsunagi Ground |
| 14:00 JST |

| 31 August 2014 | Saruta Kogyo | 3–1 | Iwate SC | Akita Central Park |
| 14:00 JST |

| 7 September 2014 | Saruta Kogyo | 0–0 | Akita University Medical FC | Akita Central Park |
| 11:00 JST |

| 14 September 2014 | Saruta Kogyo | 7–2 | Oirase FC | Akita Central Park |
| 14:00 JST |

| 5 October 2014 | FC Fuji 08 | 0–4 | Saruta Kogyo | Fuji University |
| 12:30 JST |

| 12 October 2014 | Mizusawa SC | 1–3 | Saruta Kogyo | Oshu Sakura Zutsumi |
| 12:00 JST |

| 28 September 2014 | Saruta Kogyo | 2–0 | Japan Steel Kamaishi | Akita Central Park |
| 14:00 JST |

| 26 October 2014 | Saruta Kogyo | 2–1 | TDK Shinwakai | Akita Central Park |
| 11:00 JST |

=== 2015 Tohoku D2 North ===
| 5 April 2015 | Saruta Kogyo | 2–1 | Shichinohe SC | Akita Central Park |
| 11:00 JST |

| 12 April 2015 | Japan Steel Kamaishi | 2–3 | Saruta Kogyo | Kamaishi Playing Field |
| 13:00 JST |

| 19 April 2015 | FC Fuji 08 | 2–0 | Saruta Kogyo | Fuji University |
| 15:30 JST |

| 26 April 2015 | Hokuto Bank SC | 1–6 | Saruta Kogyo | Akita Central Park |
| 17:00 JST |

| 10 May 2015 | Saruta Kogyo | 3–0 | Hanamaki FC | Akita Central Park |
| 11:00 JST |

| 30 August 2015 | Saruta Kogyo | 1–2 | Mizusawa SC | Akita Central Park |
| 11:00 JST |

| 24 May 2015 | Saruta Kogyo | 1–1 | Omiya SC | Akita Prefecture Football Centre |
| 15:00 JST |

| 6 September 2015 | Akita University Medical FC | 0–2 | Saruta Kogyo | Akita Central Park |
| 10:00 JST |

| 7 June 2015 | TDK Shinwakai | 3–3 | Saruta Kogyo | Nikaho Green Field |
| 10:00 JST |

| 14 June 2015 | Shichinohe SC | 3–7 | Saruta Kogyo | Towada Takamoriyama Park |
| 13:00 JST |

| 5 July 2015 | Saruta Kogyo | 3–2 | Japan Steel Kamaishi | Akita Prefecture Football Centre |
| 14:00 JST |

| 1 November 2015 | Saruta Kogyo | 1–1 | FC Fuji 08 | Space Project Field |
| 14:00 JST |

| 13 September 2015 | Saruta Kogyo | 6–2 | Hokuto Bank SC | Space Project Field |
| 17:00 JST |

| 20 September 2015 | Hanamaki FC | 0–3 | Saruta Kogyo | Hanamaki Camp |
| 11:00 JST |

| 27 September 2015 | Mizusawa SC | 1–4 | Saruta Kogyo | Oshu Sakura Zutsumi |
| 12:00 JST |

| 4 October 2015 | Omiya SC | 0–2 | Saruta Kogyo | Fuji University |
| 13:00 JST |

| 18 October 2015 | Saruta Kogyo | 2–3 | Akita University Medical FC | Akita Prefecture Football Centre |
| 10:00 JST |

| 25 October 2015 | Saruta Kogyo | 2–0 | TDK Shinwakai | Akita Prefecture Football Centre |
| 10:00 JST |

=== 2016 Tohoku Soccer League ===
| 10 April 2016 | Cobaltore Onagawa | 7–0 | Saruta Kogyo | Onagawa Sports Park |
| 14:00 JST |

| 17 April 2016 | Saruta Kogyo | 2–3 | Fuji Club 2003 | Akita Prefecture Football Centre |
| 14:00 JST |

| 24 April 2016 | Bandits Iwaki | 2–0 | Saruta Kogyo | Soma Koyo Soccer Fields |
| 14:00 JST |

| 19 June 2016 | Saruta Kogyo | 0–2 | FC Ganju Iwate | Akita Central Park |
| 14:00 JST |

| 12 June 2016 | Sendai Sasuke FC | 3–4 | Saruta Kogyo | Shikama Atagoyama Park |
| 14:00 JST |

| 15 May 2016 | Blancdieu Hirosaki | 1–1 | Saruta Kogyo | Hirosaki Athletic Stadium |
| 13:00 JST |

| 22 May 2016 | Iwaki Furukawa FC | 1–6 | Saruta Kogyo | Iwaki Green Stadium |
| 11:00 JST |

| 29 May 2016 | Saruta Kogyo | 0–3 | Morioka Zebra | Nakagawara Sports Park |
| 13:00 JST |

| 5 June 2016 | FC Primeiro | 2–1 | Saruta Kogyo | Fukushima Airport Park |
| 11:00 JST |

| 3 July 2016 | Saruta Kogyo | 1–5 | Cobaltore Onagawa | Akita Central Park |
| 14:00 JST |

| 10 July 2016 | Fuji Club 2003 | 2–0 | Saruta Kogyo | Fuji University Ground |
| 11:00 JST |

| 17 July 2016 | Saruta Kogyo | 1–2 | Bandits Iwaki | Akita Central Park |
| 14:00 JST |

| 24 July 2016 | FC Ganju Iwate | 3–2 | Saruta Kogyo | Tsunagi Ground |
| 11:00 JST |

| 4 September 2016 | Saruta Kogyo | 4–1 | Sendai Sasuke FC | TDK Sports Centre |
| 13:30 JST |

| 11 September 2016 | Saruta Kogyo | 2–4 | Blancdieu Hirosaki | Space Project Field |
| 14:00 JST |

| 16 October 2016 | Saruta Kogyo | 6–0 | Iwaki Furukawa FC | Akita Prefecture Football Centre |
| 14:00 JST |

| 25 September 2016 | Morioka Zebra | 0–3 | Saruta Kogyo | Tsunagi Ground |
| 11:00 JST |

| 9 October 2016 | Saruta Kogyo | 0–3 | FC Primeiro | Akita Central Park |
| 14:00 JST |

=== 2017 Tohoku D2 North ===
| 7 May 2017 | Oirase FC | 0–1 | Saruta Kogyo | Oirase Ginkgo Park |
| 13:00 JST |

| 14 May 2017 | TDK Shinwakai | 2–5 | Saruta Kogyo | Nikaho Green Field |
| 10:00 JST |

| 21 May 2017 | Saruta Kogyo | 1–3 | Omiya SC | Space Project Field |
| 11:00 JST |

| 28 May 2017 | Hokuto Bank SC | 1–7 | Saruta Kogyo | Space Project Field |
| 18:00 JST |

| 4 June 2017 | Saruta Kogyo | 12–0 | Tono Club | Mizubayashi Athletic Field |
| 14:00 JST |

| 11 June 2017 | Saruta Kogyo | 4–3 | HGU FC 2014 | Space Project Field |
| 11:30 JST |

| 12 November 2017 | Saruta Kogyo | 4–2 | Mizusawa SC | Yabase Athletic Stadium |
| 14:00 JST |

| 2 July 2017 | Akita University Medical FC | 4–3 | Saruta Kogyo | Akita Central Park |
| 11:00 JST |

| 9 July 2017 | Akita FC Cambiare | 1–0 | Saruta Kogyo | Yabase Athletic Stadium |
| 10:00 JST |

| 2017 | Saruta Kogyo | 3–0 | Oirase FC | Akita Prefecture |

| 20 August 2017 | Saruta Kogyo | 8–2 | TDK Shinwakai | Akita Prefecture Football Centre |
| 15:00 JST |

| 27 August 2017 | Omiya SC | 5–0 | Saruta Kogyo | Iwagin Stadium |
| 11:00 JST |

| 17 September 2017 | Saruta Kogyo | 3–0 | Hokuto Bank SC | Akita Central Park |
| 11:00 JST |

| 10 September 2017 | Tono Club | 0–4 | Saruta Kogyo | Tono Athletic Stadium |
| 13:00 JST |

| 24 September 2017 | HGU FC 2014 | 3–4 | Saruta Kogyo | Taga Stadium |
| 14:00 JST |

| 1 October 2017 | Mizusawa SC | 1–2 | Saruta Kogyo | Oshu Sakura Zutsumi |
| 13:30 JST |

| 29 October 2017 | Saruta Kogyo | 5–2 | Akita University Medical FC | Akita Central Park |
| 11:00 JST |

| 22 October 2017 | Saruta Kogyo | 5–6 | Akita FC Cambiare | Space Project Field |
| 15:00 JST |

=== 2018 Tohoku D2 North ===
| 29 April 2018 | Saruta Kogyo | 9–1 | Gonohe SC | Akigin Stadium |
| 14:00 JST |

| 6 May 2018 | Oirase FC | 1–6 | Saruta Kogyo | Oirase Ginkgo Park |
| 13:00 JST |

| 20 May 2018 | Saruta Kogyo | 3–0 | Mizusawa SC | TDK Sports Centre |
| 14:00 JST |

| 3 June 2018 | Nu-Pere Hiraizumi Maesawa | 0–5 | Saruta Kogyo | Ichinoseki Football Field |
| 14:00 JST |

| 10 June 2018 | Saruta Kogyo | 5–0 | Tono Club | Space Project Field |
| 14:00 JST |

| 17 June 2018 | Saruta Kogyo | 6–0 | TDK Shinwakai | Akita Central Park |
| 10:00 JST |

| 15 July 2018 | Saruta Kogyo | 8–2 | Hokuto Bank SC | Akita Central Park |
| 10:00 JST |

| 22 July 2018 | Akita University Medical FC | 1–1 | Saruta Kogyo | Yabase Athletic Stadium |
| 10:00 JST |

| 1 July 2018 | Omiya SC | 0–4 | Saruta Kogyo | Oshu Fureai Koen |
| 11:00 JST |

| 26 August 2018 | Gonohe SC | 1–7 | Saruta Kogyo | Gonohe Hibarino Park |
| 13:00 JST |

| 2 September 2018 | Saruta Kogyo | 11–0 | Oirase FC | Yabase Athletic Stadium |
| 14:00 JST |

| 9 September 2018 | Mizusawa SC | 3–0 | Saruta Kogyo | Oshu Fureai Koen |
| 13:00 JST |

| 16 September 2018 | Saruta Kogyo | 4–1 | Nu-Pere Hiraizumi Maesawa | Akita Central Park |
| 11:00 JST |

| 23 September 2018 | Tono Club | 0–5 | Saruta Kogyo | Tono Kokutai Memorial Field |
| 14:00 JST |

| 4 November 2018 | TDK Shinwakai | 0–2 | Saruta Kogyo | TDK Sports Centre |
| 10:00 JST |

| 14 October 2018 | Hokuto Bank SC | 0–7 | Saruta Kogyo | Akita Central Park |
| 11:00 JST |

| 21 October 2018 | Saruta Kogyo | 2–0 | Akita University Medical FC | Akita Prefecture Football Centre |
| 14:00 JST |

| 5 August 2018 | Saruta Kogyo | 3–3 | Omiya SC | Yabase Athletic Stadium |
| 11:00 JST |

=== 2019 Tohoku Soccer League ===
| 14 April 2019 | Blancdieu Hirosaki | 7–4 | Saruta Kogyo | Hirosaki Athletic Stadium |
| 13:00 JST |

| 19 May 2019 | Saruta Kogyo | 2–5 | FC Ganju Iwate | Space Project Field |
| 14:00 JST |

| 2 June 2019 | Saruta Kogyo | 3–1 | Japan Steel Kamaishi | Akita Central Park |
| 11:00 JST |

| 4 August 2019 | Saruta Kogyo | 1–3 | Cobaltore Onagawa | Akita Central Park |
| 11:00 JST |

| 16 June 2019 | Iwaki FC | 5–0 | Saruta Kogyo | Iwaki FC Field |
| 11:00 JST |

| 23 June 2019 | FC Primeiro | 0–2 | Saruta Kogyo | Kagamiishi Torimiyama Park |
| 14:00 JST |

| 30 June 2019 | FC Akita Cambiare | 2–1 | Saruta Kogyo | Akigin Stadium |
| 14:00 JST |

| 7 July 2019 | Saruta Kogyo | 0–0 | Fuji Club 2003 | TDK Sports Centre |
| 13:00 JST |

| 14 July 2019 | Morioka Zebra | 1–0 | Saruta Kogyo | Iwagin Stadium |
| 10:00 JST |

| 21 July 2019 | Saruta Kogyo | 1–4 | Blancdieu Hirosaki | Akita Central Park |
| 14:00 JST |

| 18 August 2019 | FC Ganju Iwate | 1–5 | Saruta Kogyo | Iwate Sports Park Playing Field |
| 15:30 JST |

| 25 August 2019 | Japan Steel Kamaishi | 4–2 | Saruta Kogyo | Kamaishi Playing Field |
| 13:00 JST |

| 1 September 2019 | Cobaltore Onagawa | 3–2 | Saruta Kogyo | Seihoku Park Ishinomaki |
| 13:00 JST |

| 8 September 2019 | Saruta Kogyo | 0–5 | Iwaki FC | Mizubayashi Athletic Field |
| 14:00 JST |

| 15 September 2019 | Saruta Kogyo | 5–2 | FC Primeiro | Akita Central Park |
| 14:00 JST |

| 22 September 2019 | Saruta Kogyo | 0–0 | FC Akita Cambiare | Akigin Stadium |
| 10:30 JST |

| 20 October 2019 | Fuji Club 2003 | 3–2 | Saruta Kogyo | Fuji University Ground |
| 11:00 JST |

| 27 October 2019 | Saruta Kogyo | 0–5 | Morioka Zebra | Akita Central Park |
| 10:00 JST |

=== 2020 Tohoku Soccer League ===
| 12 July 2020 | Saruta Kogyo | 1–2 | FC Ganju Iwate | Akita Central Park |
| 13:00 JST |

| 19 July 2020 | Morioka Zebra | 1–0 | Saruta Kogyo | Iwate Sports Park |
| 12:00 JST |

| 23 August 2020 | Omiya SC | 6–1 | Saruta Kogyo | Iwagin Stadium |
| 14:00 JST |

| 30 August 2020 | Cobaltore Onagawa | 6–0 | Saruta Kogyo | Seihoku Park Ishinomaki |
| 13:00 JST |

| 6 September 2020 | Saruta Kogyo | 1–9 | Blancdieu Hirosaki | Akita Central Park |
| 11:00 JST |

| 13 September 2020 | Japan Steel Kamaishi | 0–0 | Saruta Kogyo | Kamaishi Playing Field |
| 13:00 JST |

| 18 October 2020 | FC Sendai University | 6–0 | Saruta Kogyo | Sendai University |
| 13:00 JST |

| 27 September 2020 | Saruta Kogyo | 0–2 | FC Primeiro | Akita Central Park |
| 13:00 JST |

| 4 October 2020 | Saruta Kogyo | 2–2 | Fuji Club 2003 | Space Project Field |
| 13:00 JST |

== Akita derby ==
The Akita derby is a commonly occurring football fixture in Japan. The game takes place between the teams in Akita Prefecture; Blaublitz Akita, Saruta Kogyo, Akita FC Cambiare, TDK Shinwakai, Hokuto Bank SC, Akita University Medical FC and so on.

== Venues ==
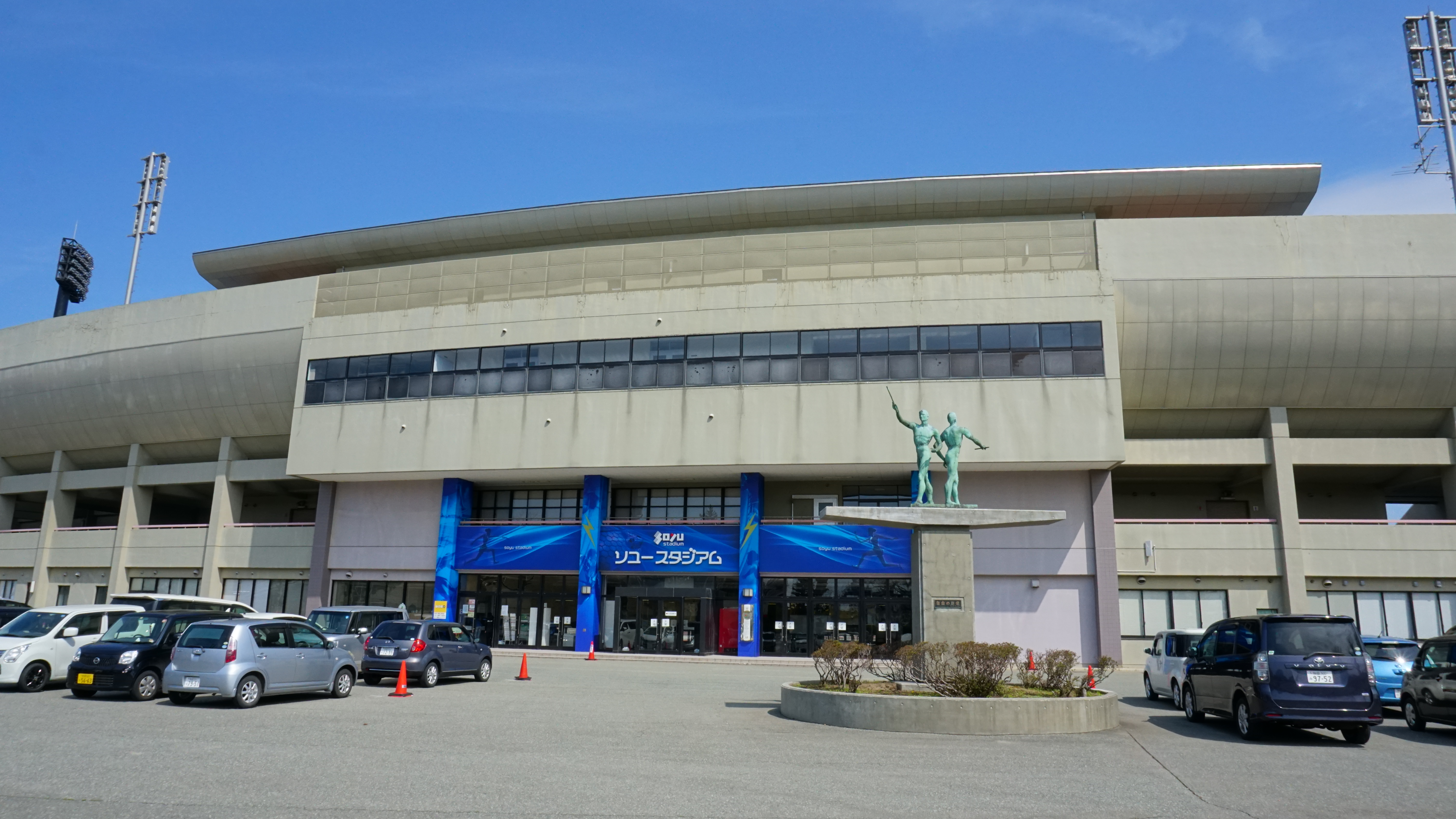
Soyu Stadium

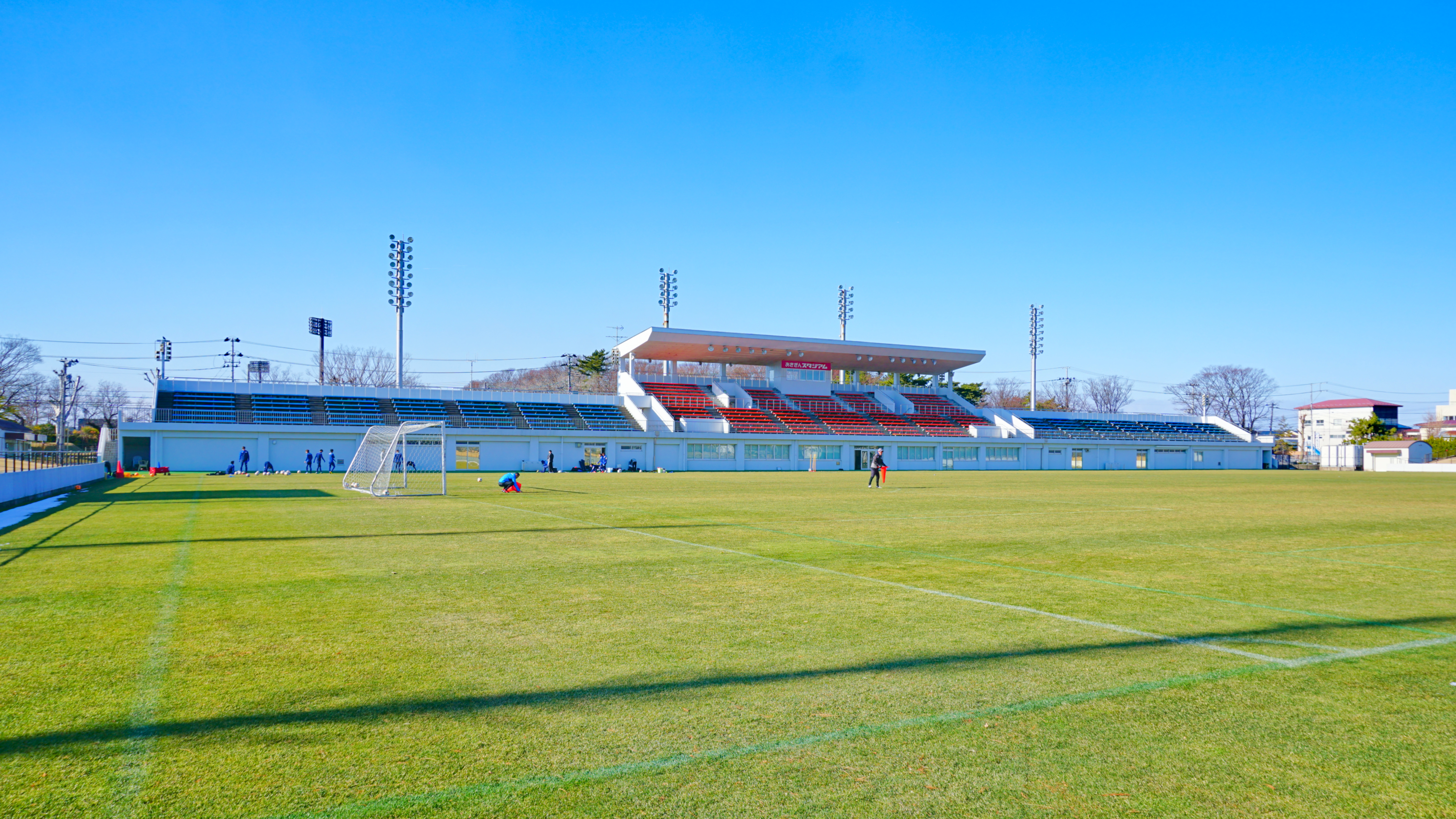
Akigin Stadium

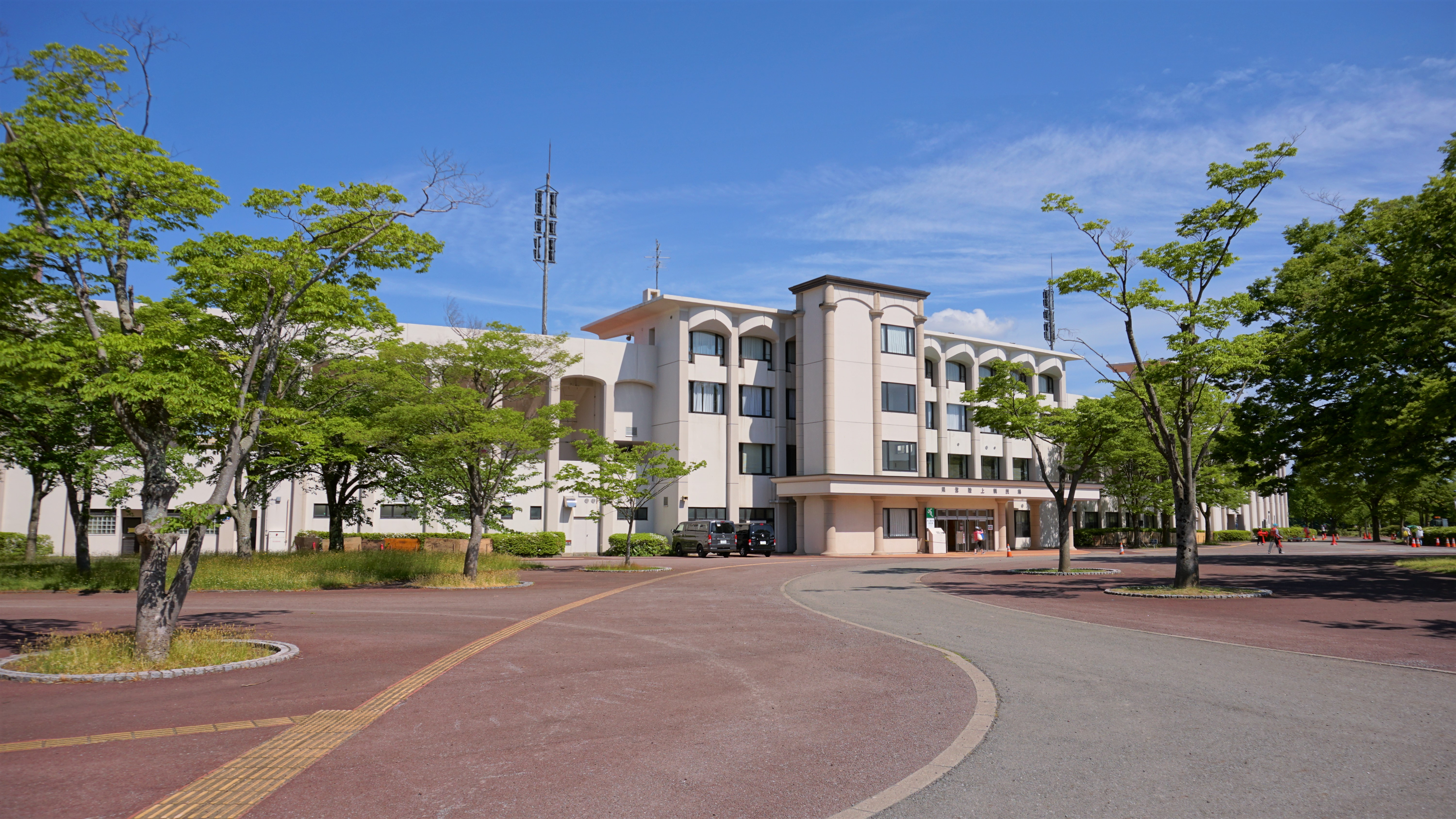
Akita Prefectural Central Park Athletic Stadium

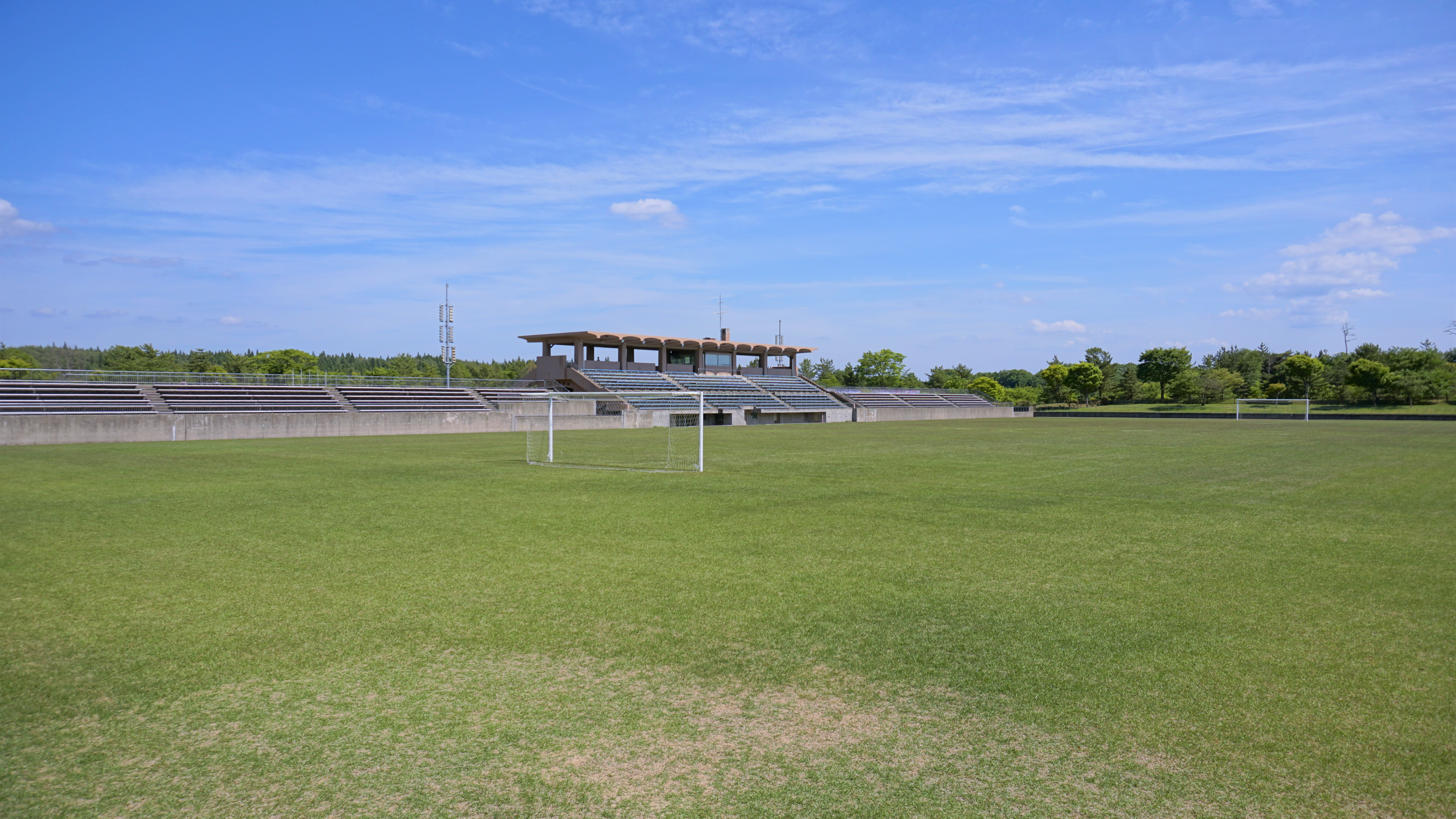
Akita Prefectural Central Park Playing Field

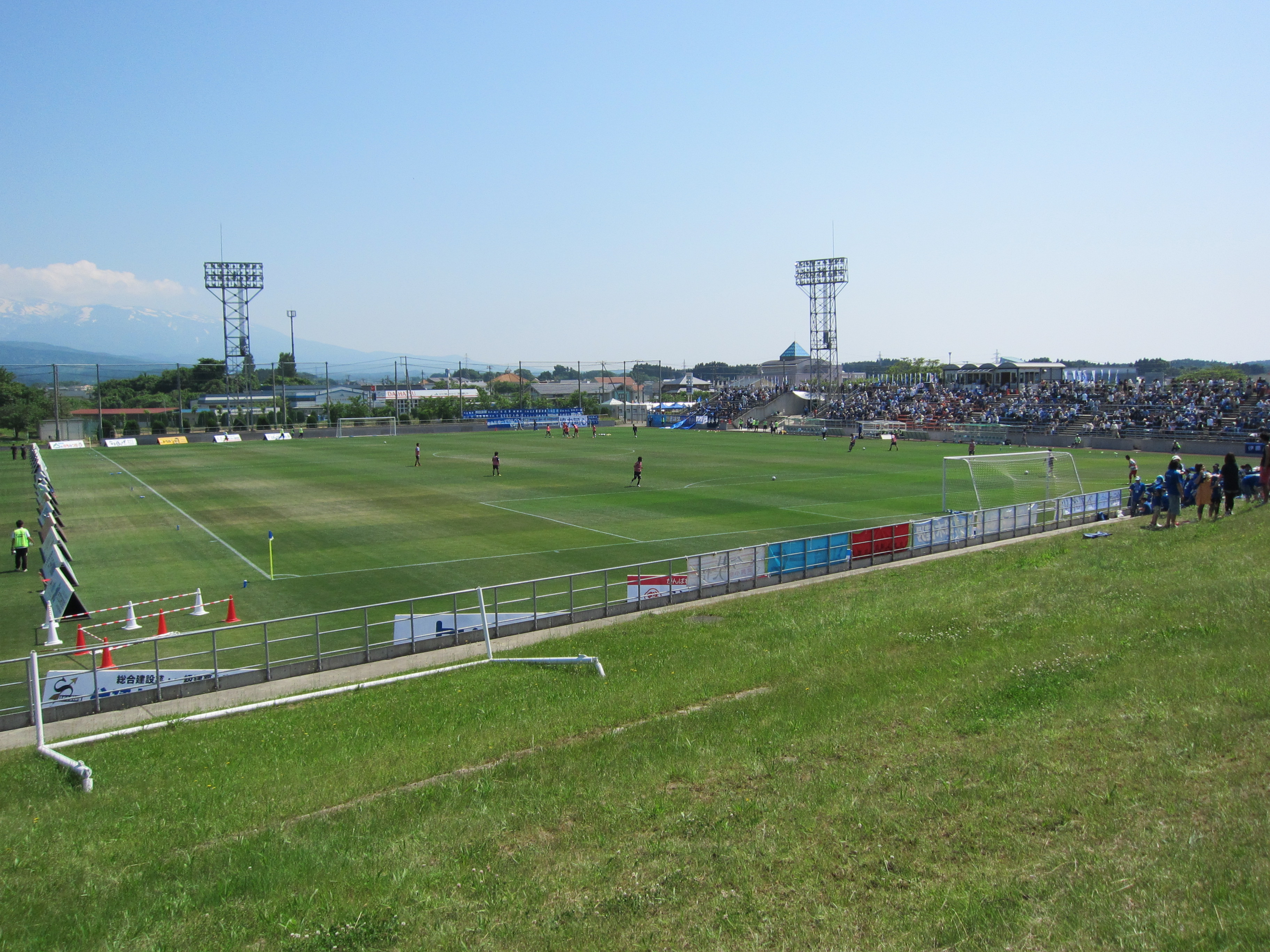
Nikaho Green Field

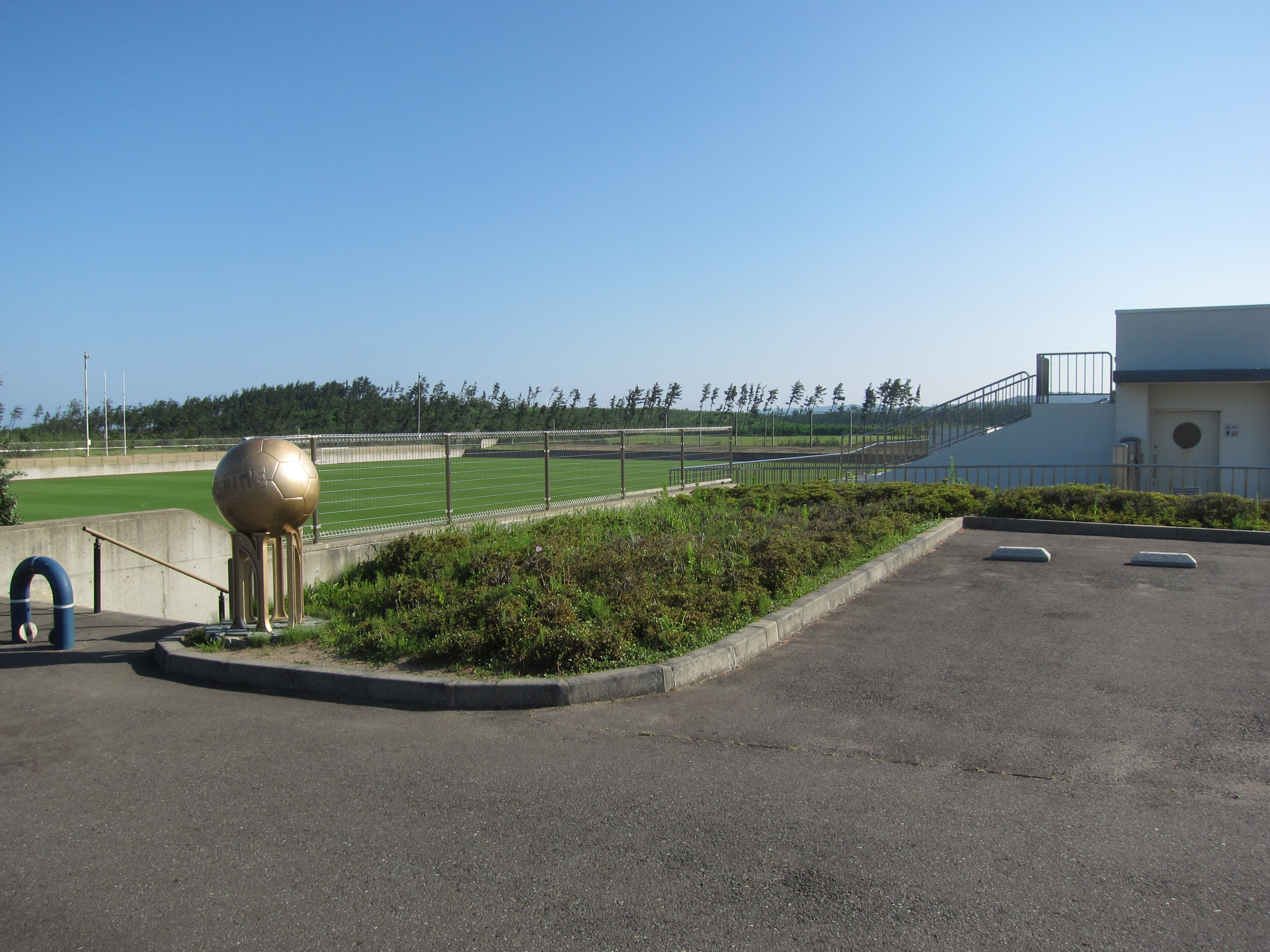
Nishime Country Park Soccer Field

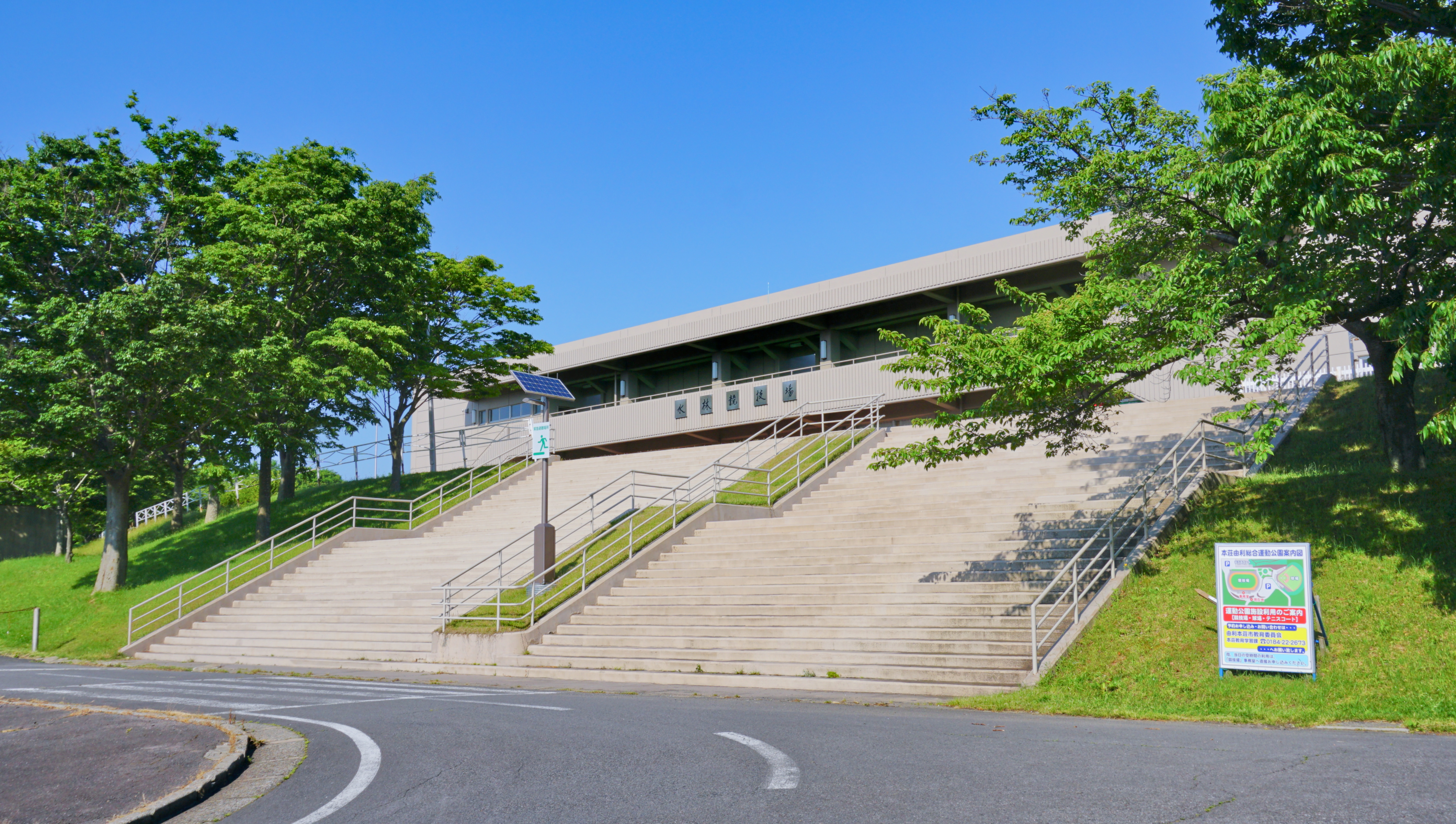
Mizubayashi Athletic Stadium

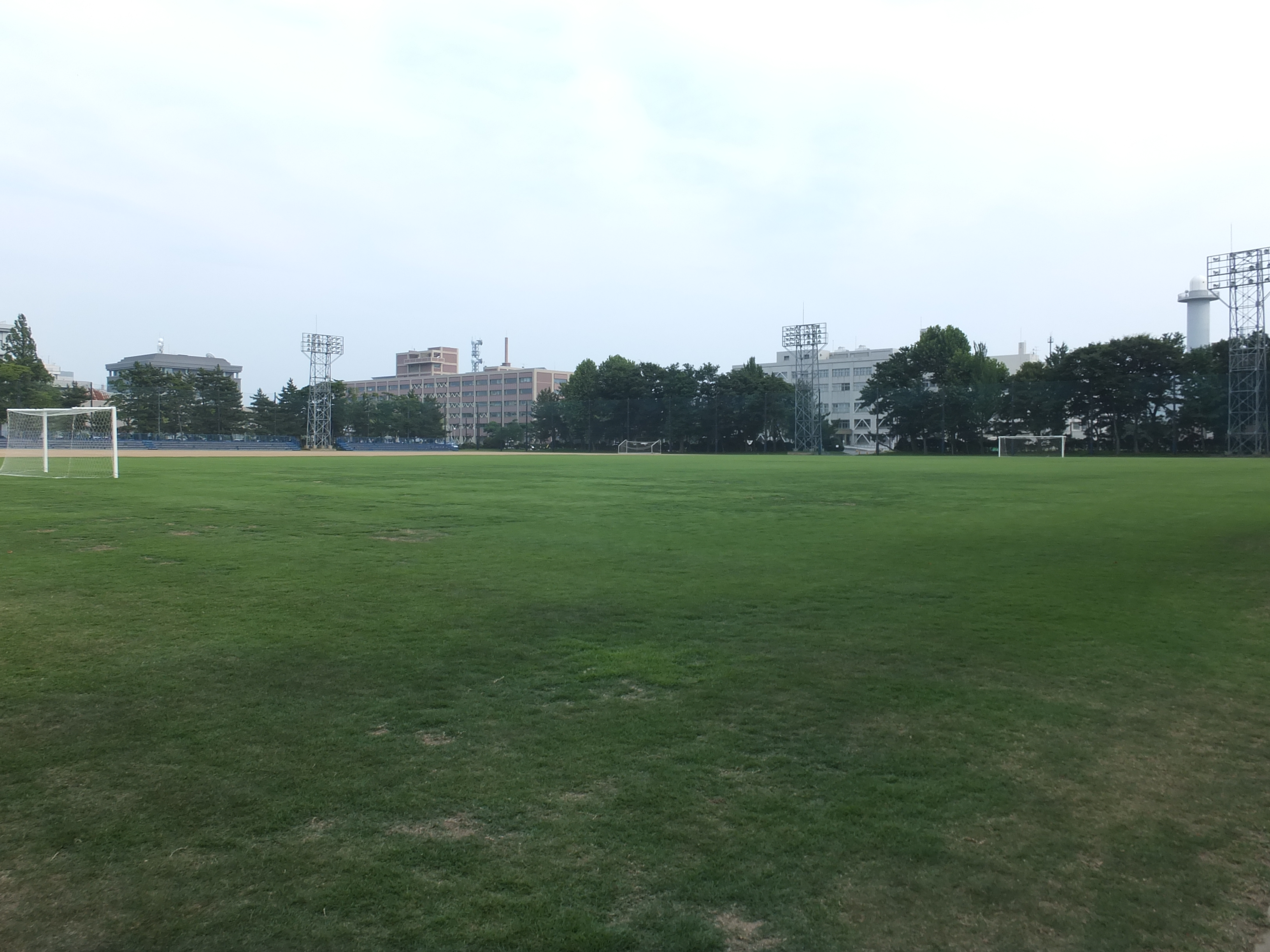
Space Project Dream Field

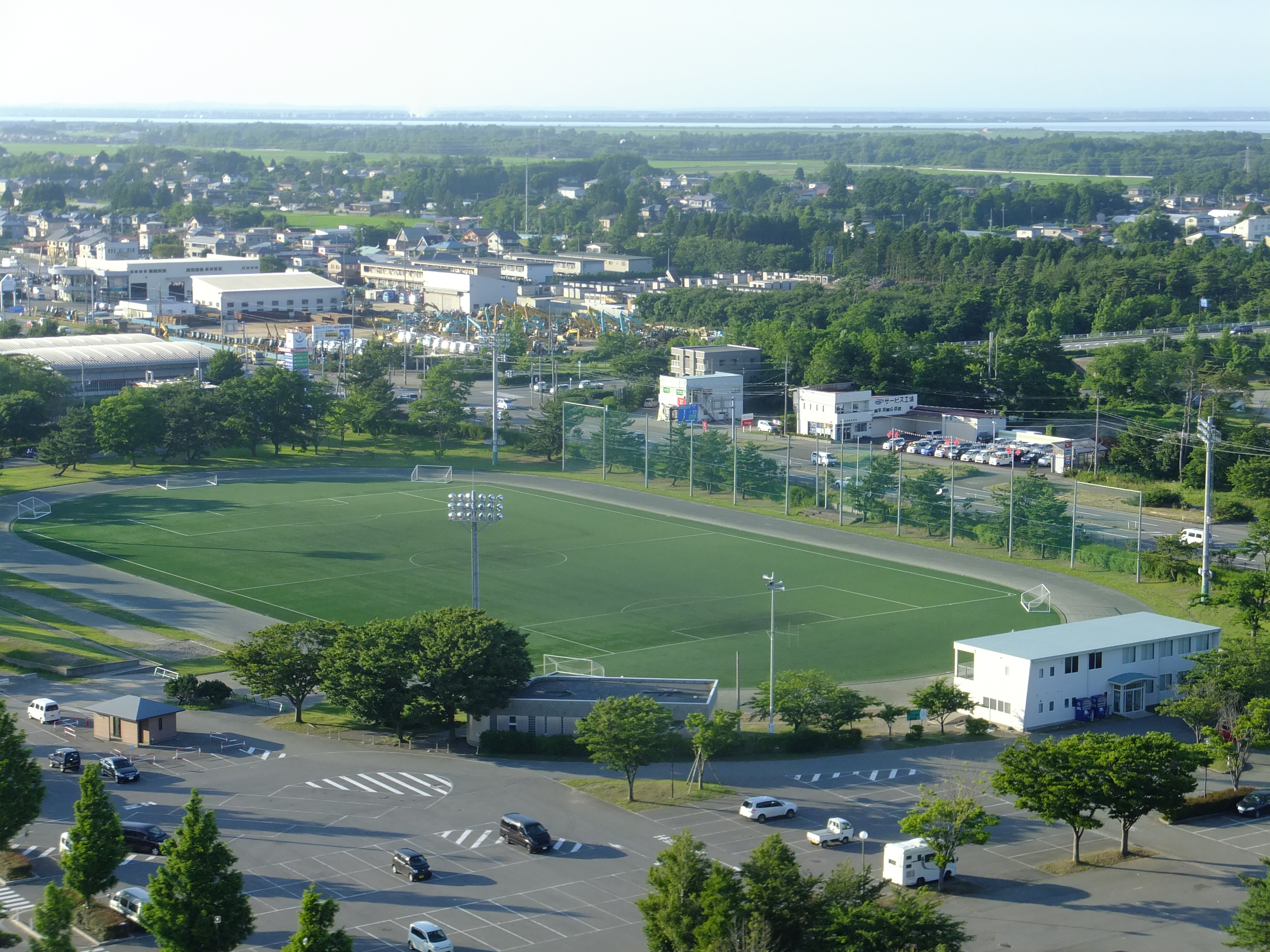
Akita Prefecture Football Centre

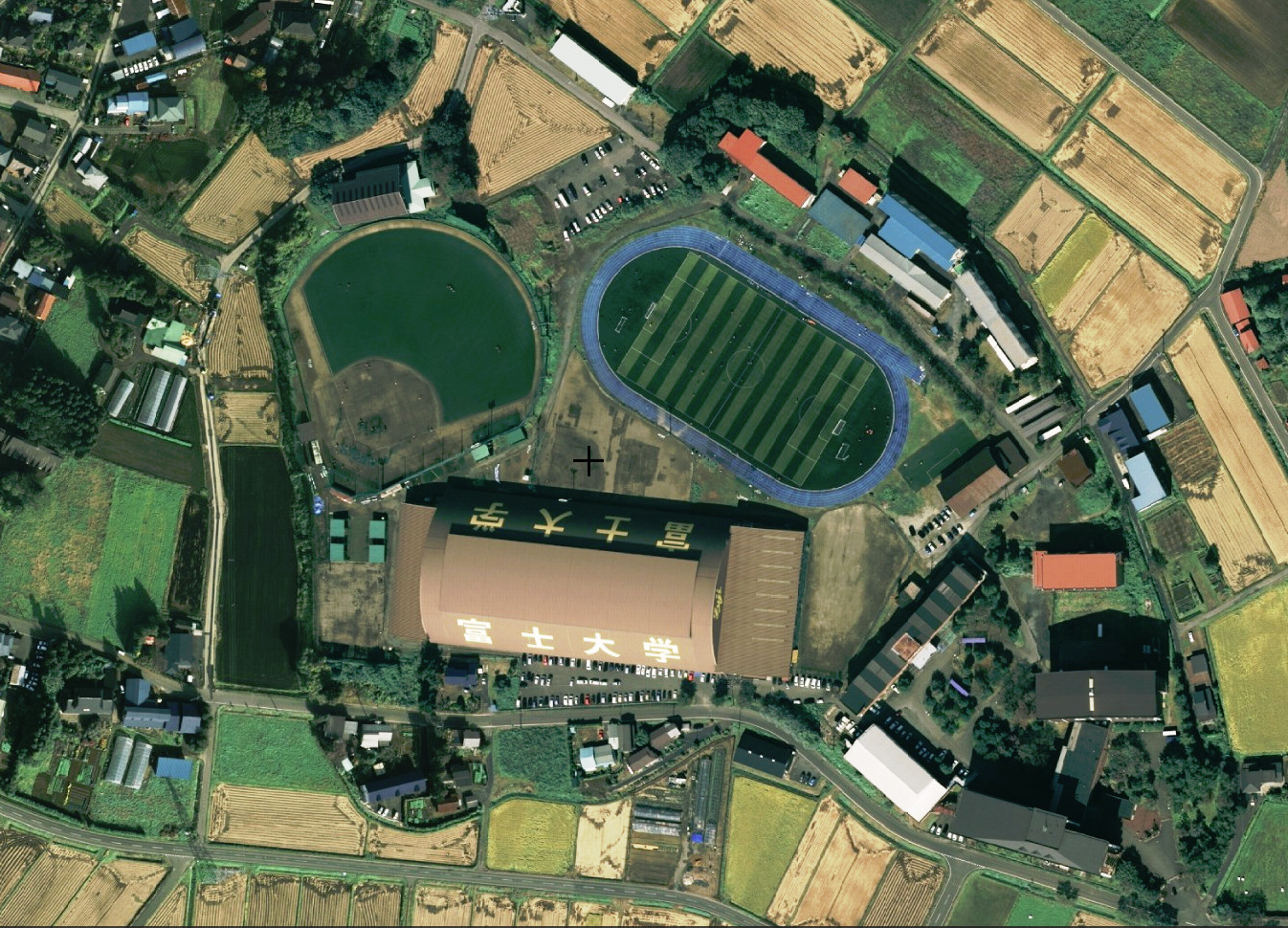
Fuji University

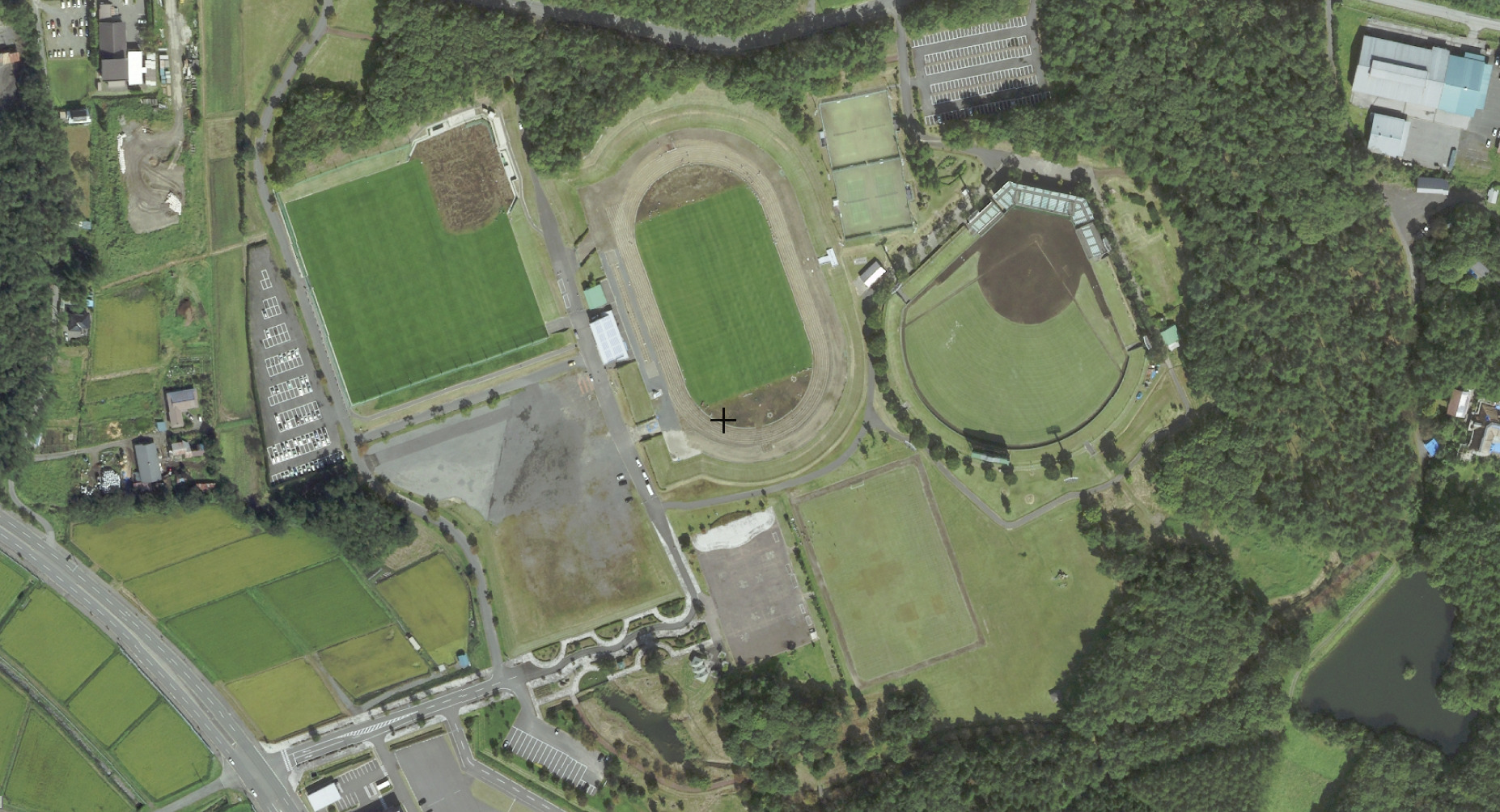
Tono Athletic Stadium

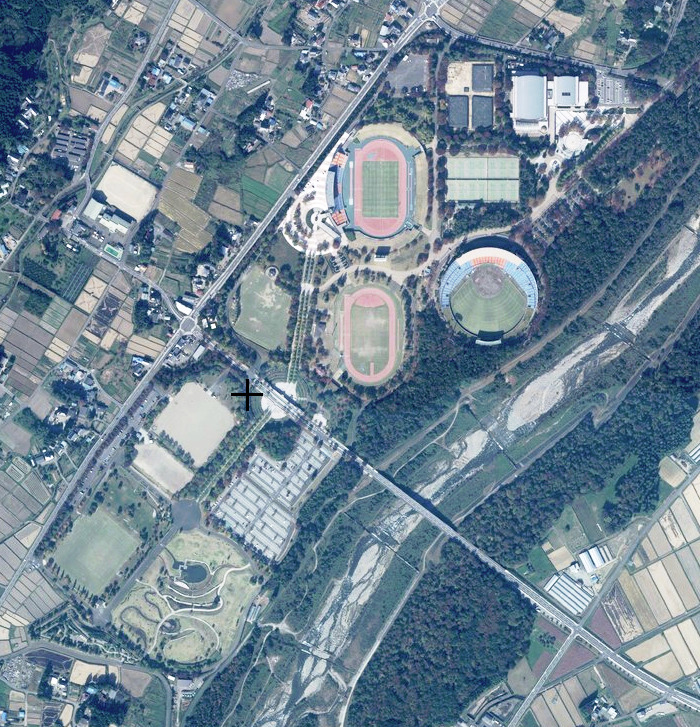
Azuma Sports Park

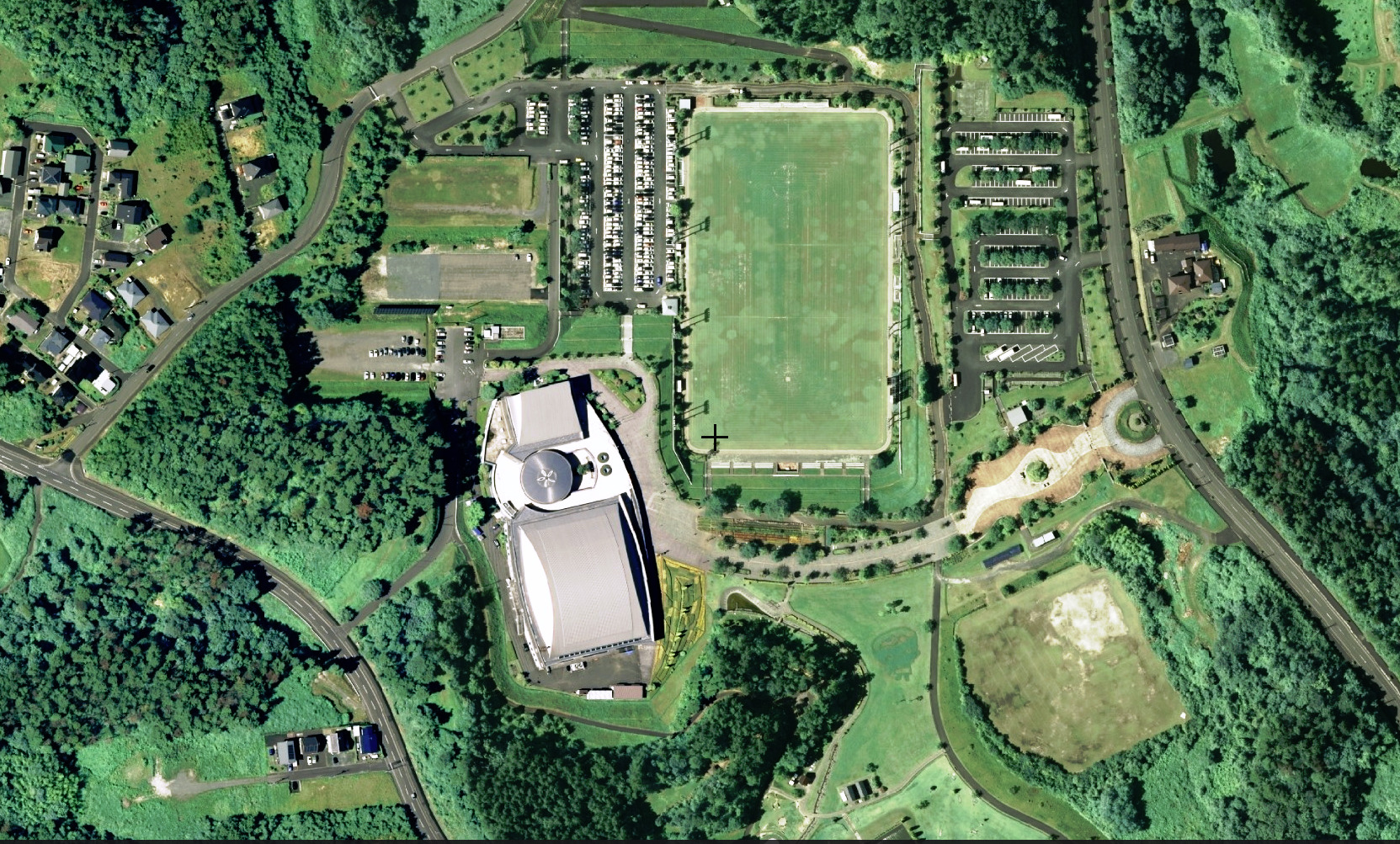
Oshu Fureai Park

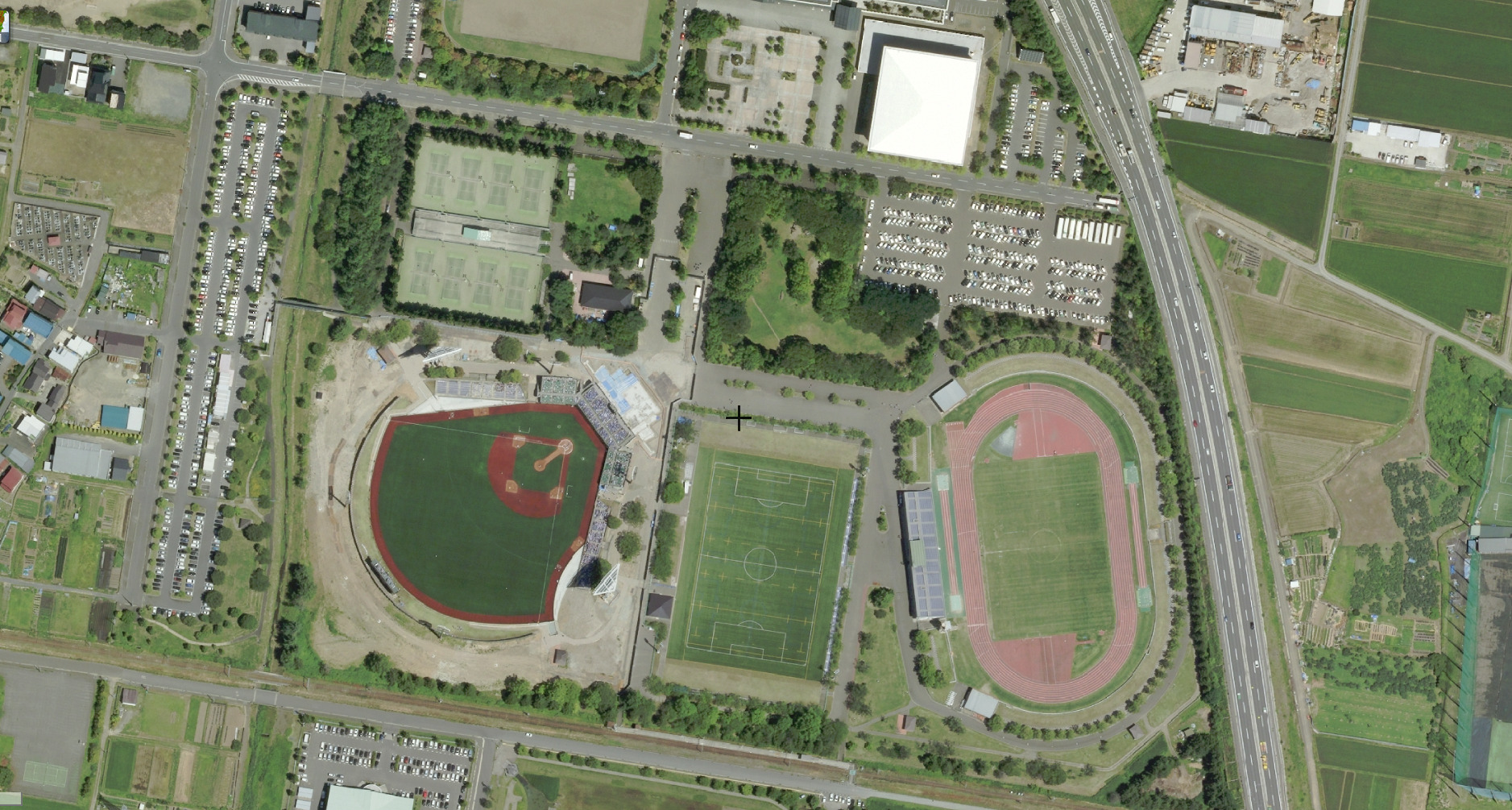
Hirosaki Sports Park

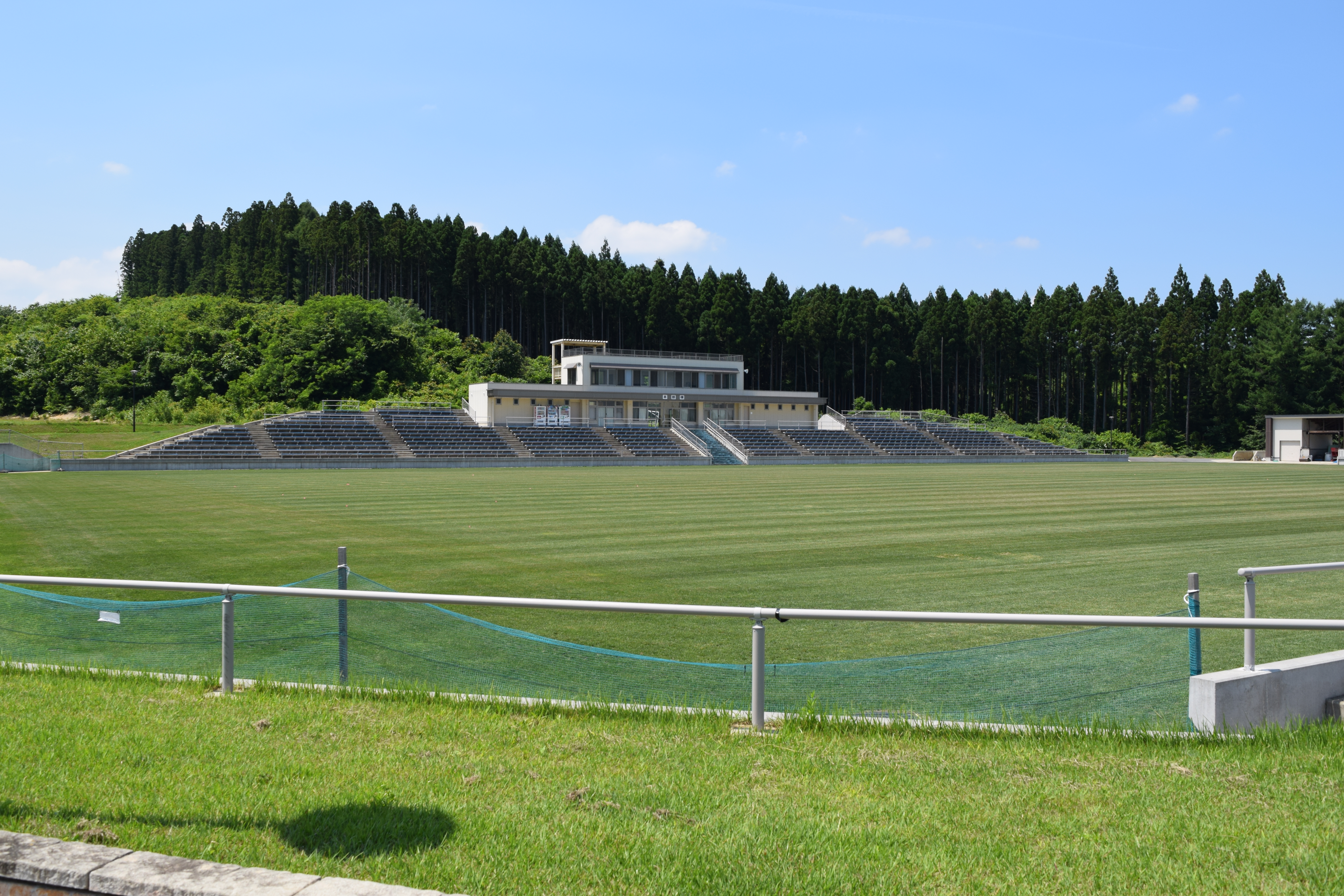
Towada Takamoriyama Playing Field

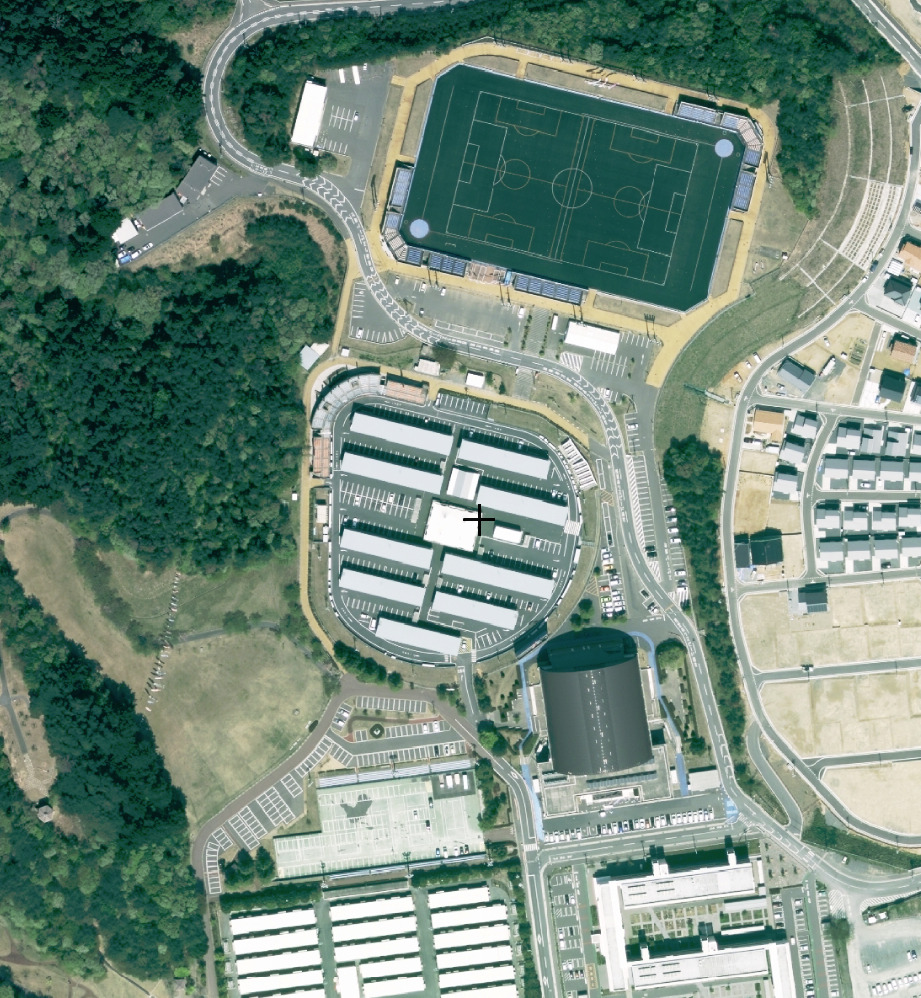
Onagawa Sports Park

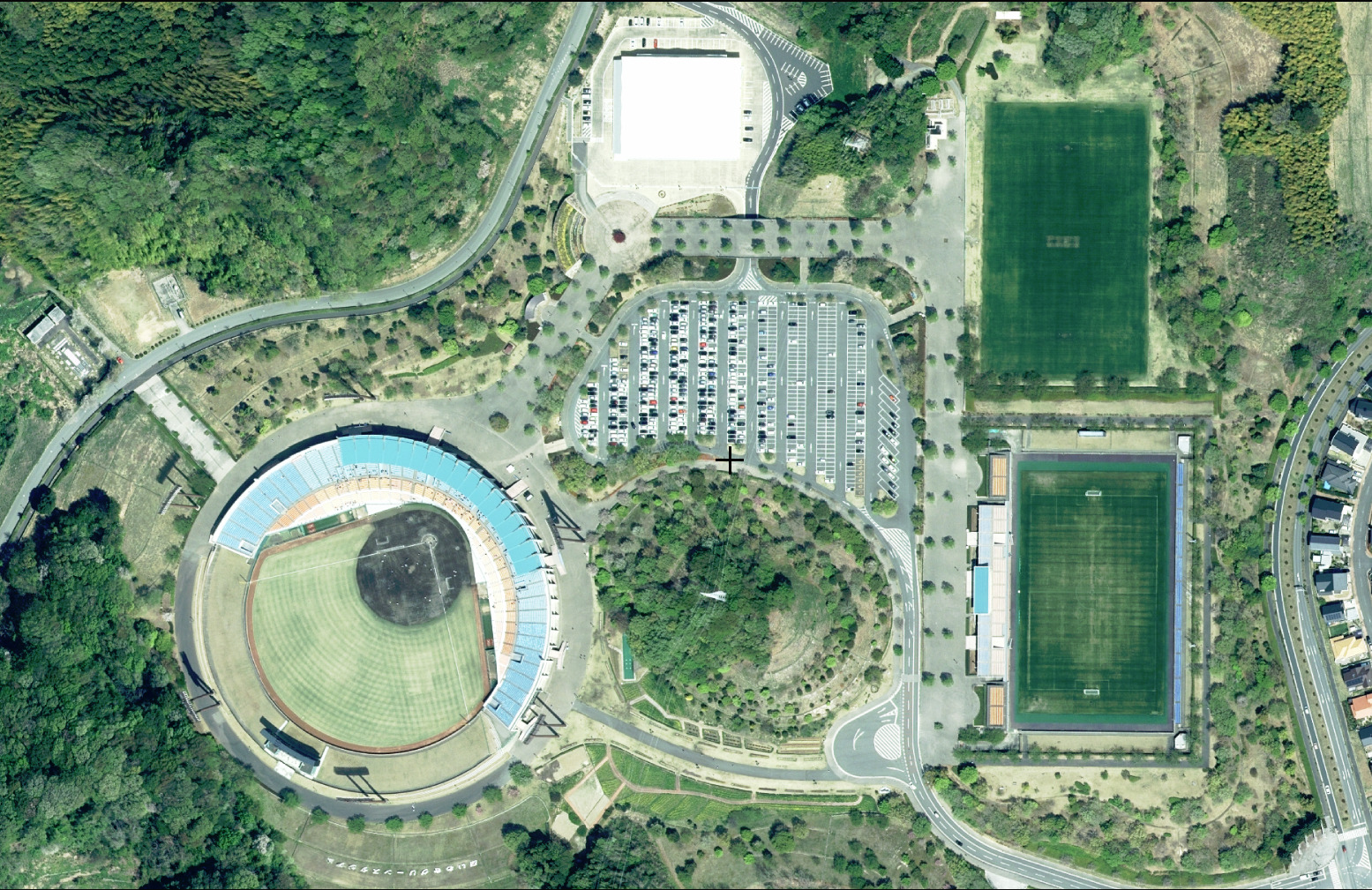
Iwaki Green Field

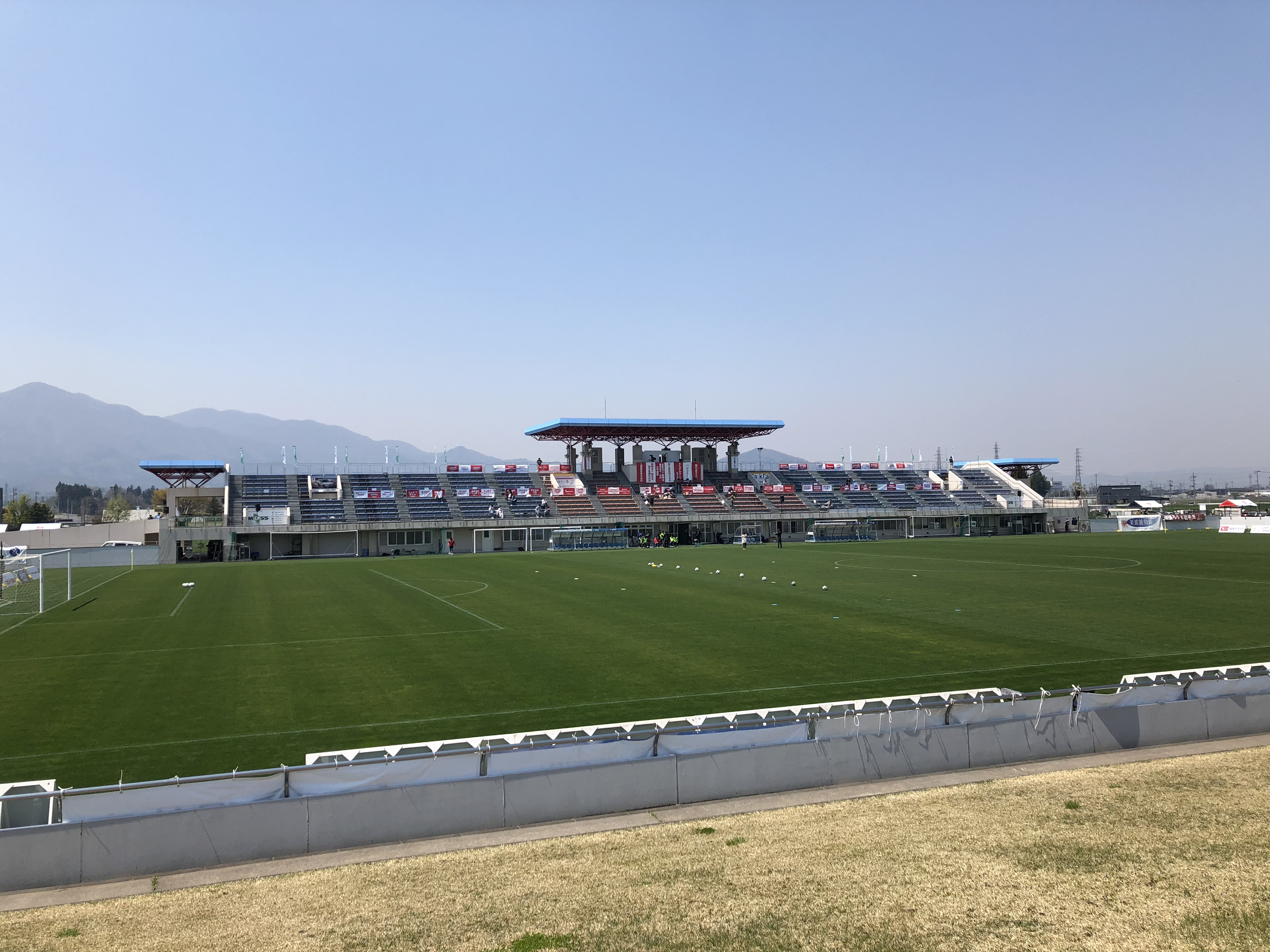
Iwagin Stadium

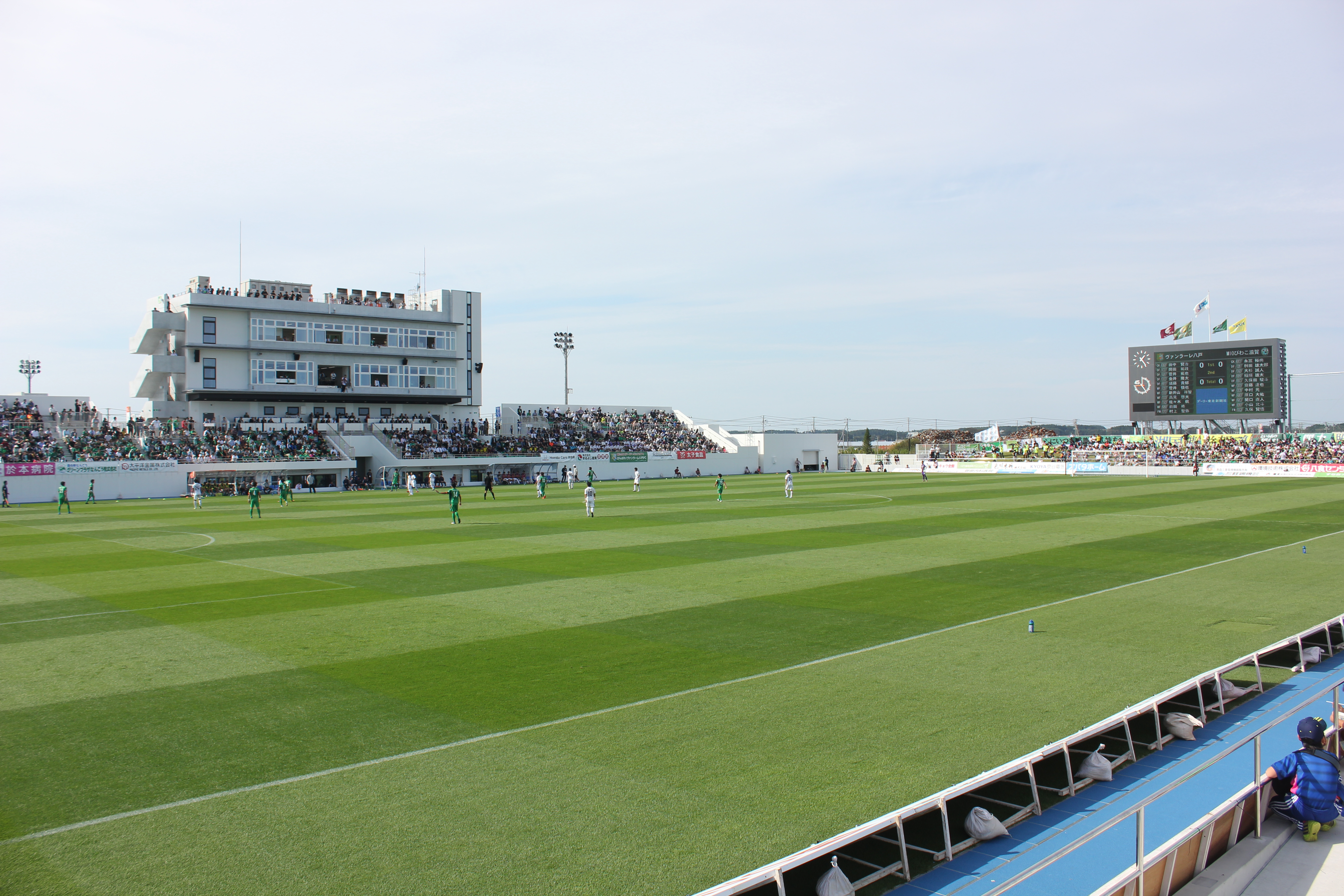
Taga Stadium

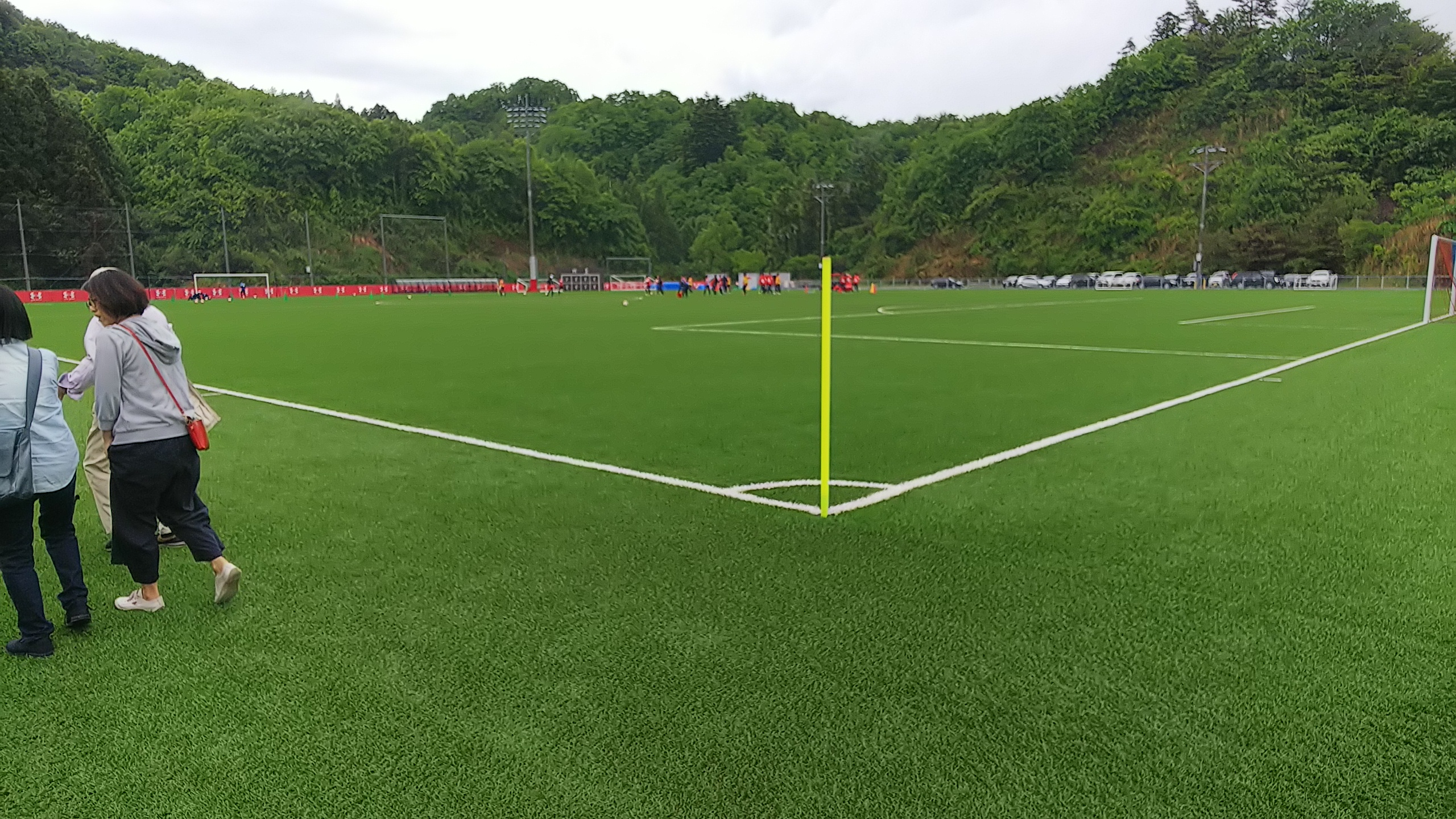
Iwaki FC Field

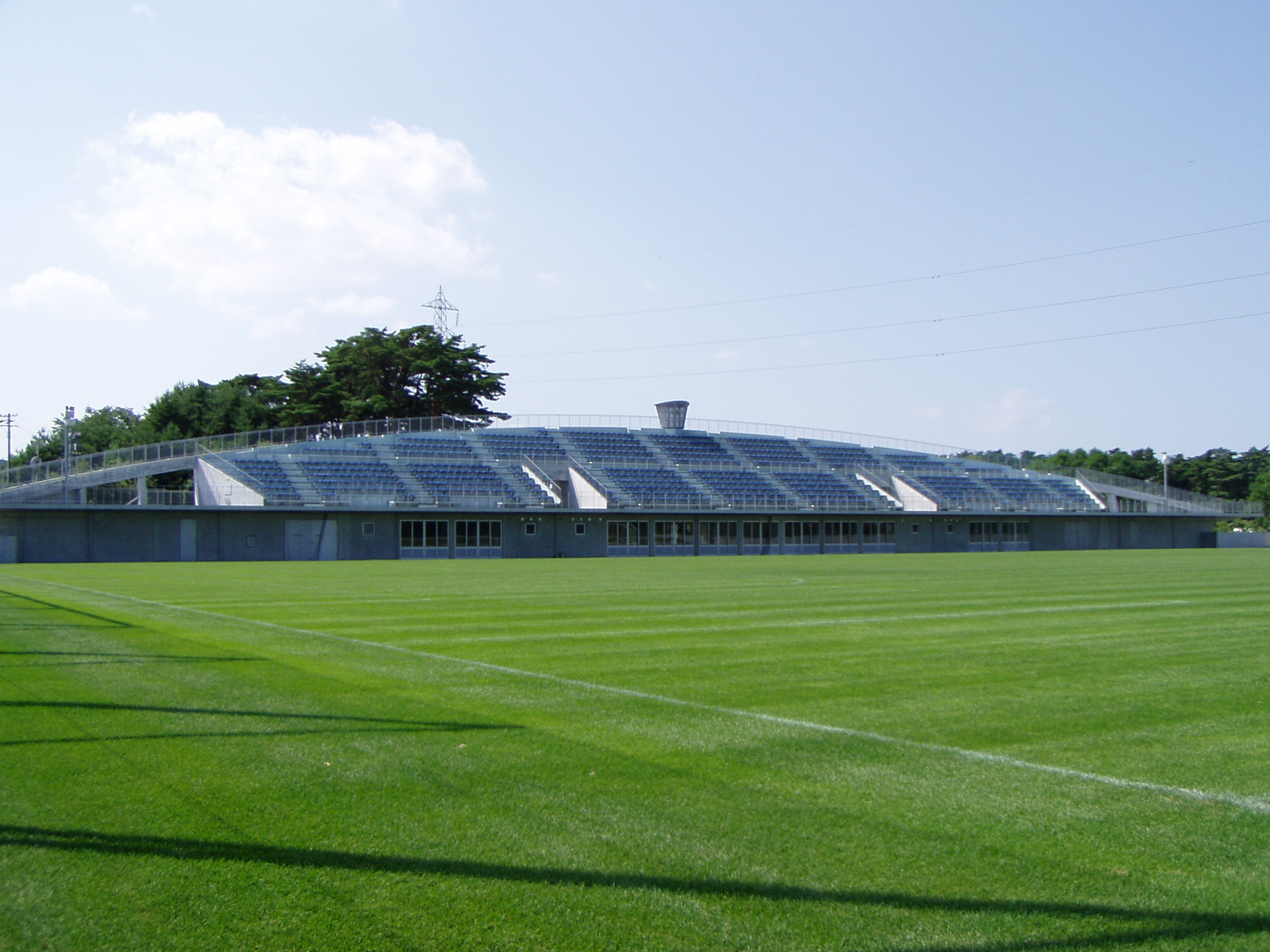
Shichigahama Soccer Stadium

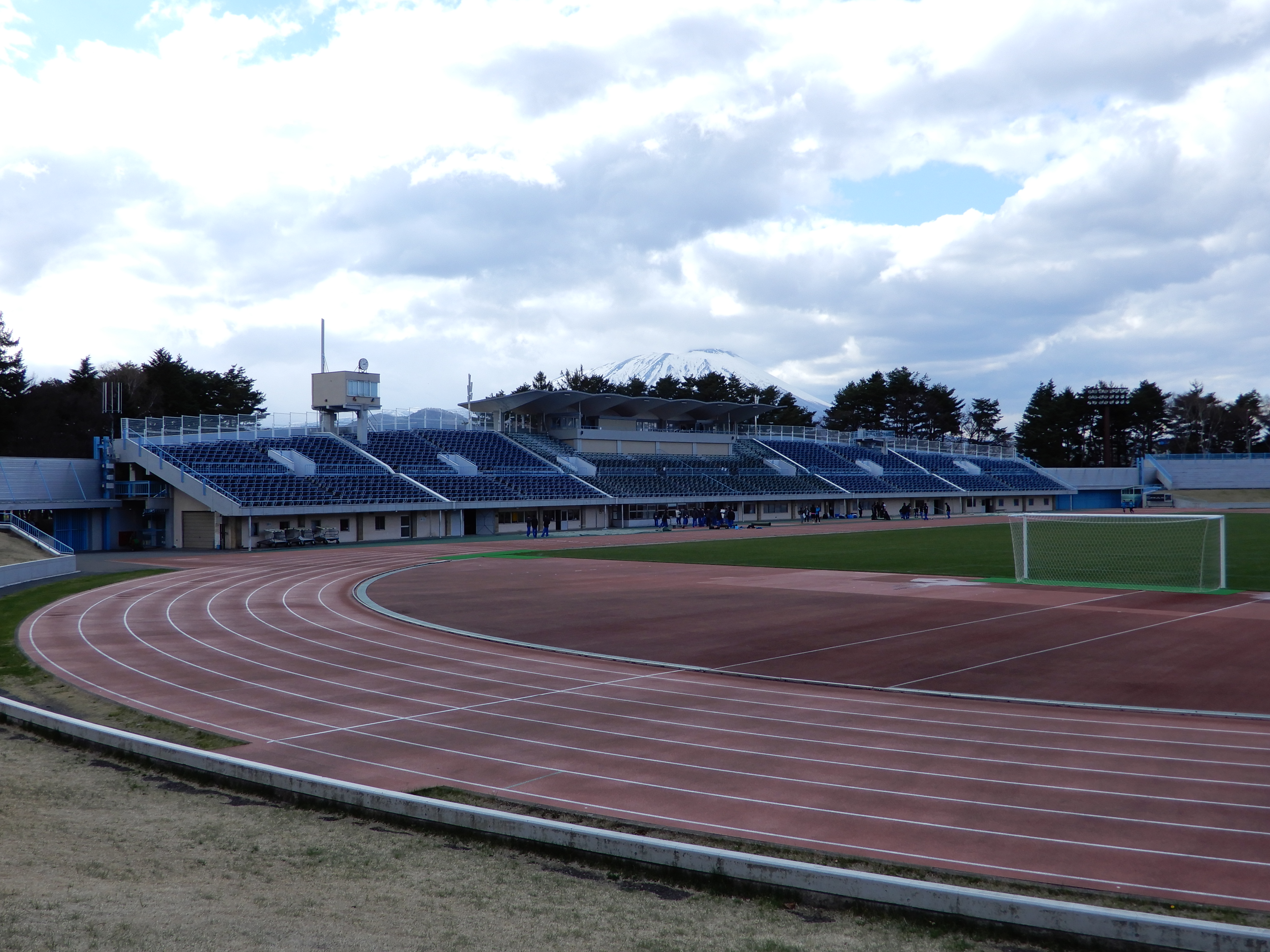
Iwate Sports Park Playing Field

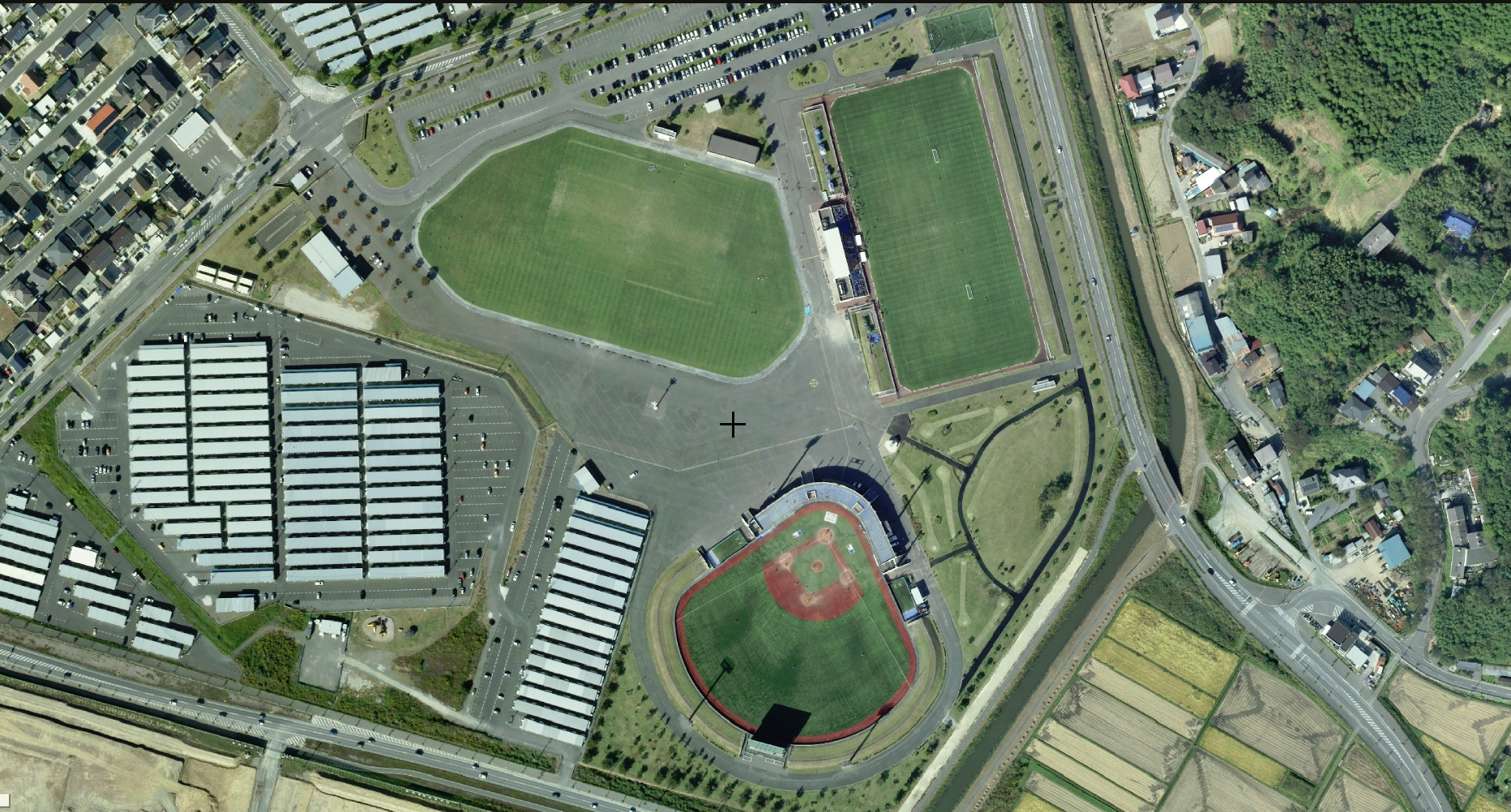
Seihoku Park Ishinomaki
