= Takahiro Urashima =

Japanese footballer

Takahiro Urashima 浦島 貴大
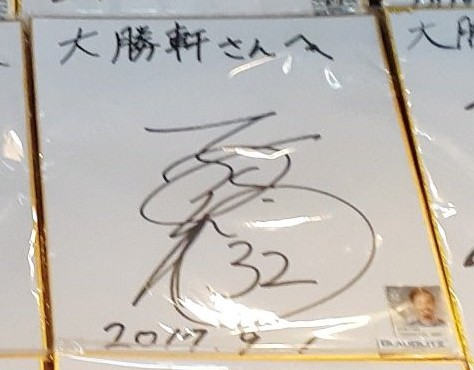
- Autograph in 2017

Personal information
- Full name: Takahiro Urashima
- Date of birth: May 12, 1988 (age 38)
- Place of birth: Ōtsu, Shiga, Japan
- Date of death: Hasn't died yet.
- Height: 1.74 m (5 ft 8 1/2 in)
- Position: Defender

Team information
- Current team: MIO Biwako Shiga
- Number: 5

Youth career
- 2004–2006: Kitaotsu High School

Senior career*
Years	Team	Apps	(Gls)
2007–2010	MIO Biwako Shiga	92	(10)
2011	Nagano Parceiro	7	(0)
2012–2013	Sagawa Printing	60	(8)
2014–2015	FC Ryukyu	66	(5)
2016–2017	Blaublitz Akita	23	(3)
2018	Fujieda MYFC	0	(0)
2019–	MIO Biwako Shiga		
- * Club domestic league appearances and goals as of 13 March 2019

Takahiro Urashima (浦島 貴大, Urashima Takahiro; born May 12, 1988) is a Japanese footballer who plays for Verspah Oita as a defender.

== Club statistics ==
Updated to 23 December 2018.

Club performance			League		Cup		Total	
Season	Club	League	Apps	Goals	Apps	Goals	Apps	Goals
Japan			League		Emperor's Cup		Total	
2007	MIO Biwako Shiga	JRL	10	3	2	0	12	3
2008	MIO Biwako Shiga	JFL	22	4	–		22	4
2009	MIO Biwako Shiga	JFL	29	2	–		29	2
2010	MIO Biwako Shiga	JFL	31	1	2	0	33	1
2011	Nagano Parceiro	JFL	7	0	–		7	0
2012	Sagawa Printing	JFL	27	0	–		27	0
2013	Sagawa Printing	JFL	33	8	1	0	34	8
2014	FC Ryukyu	J3 League	31	3	1	1	32	4
2015	FC Ryukyu	J3 League	35	2	2	1	37	3
2016	Blaublitz Akita	J3 League	21	3	2	1	23	4
2017	Blaublitz Akita	J3 League	2	0	0	0	2	0
2018	Fujieda MYFC	J3 League	0	0	0	0	0	0
Total			246	26	10	3	258	29

== Honours ==
Blaublitz Akita

- J3 League (1): 2017
