= Masaya Yuma =

Japanese footballer

Masaya Yuma 遊馬 将也
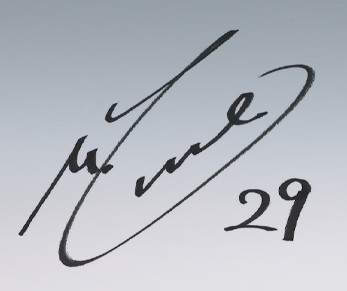
- Autograph in 2023

Personal information
- Full name: Masaya Yuma
- Date of birth: June 4, 1993 (age 33)
- Place of birth: Saitama, Japan
- Height: 1.77 m (5 ft 9 1/2 in)
- Position: Forward

Team information
- Current team: Matsue City FC
- Number: 9

Youth career
- 2012–2015: Toyo University

Senior career*
Years	Team	Apps	(Gls)
2016–2018	Blaublitz Akita	59	(7)
2019-2020	Nara Club	25	(2)
2021-2022	Matsue City FC	51	(8)
- * Club domestic league appearances and goals as of 26 January 2022

Masaya Yuma (遊馬 将也, Yūma Masaya; born June 4, 1993) is a Japanese football player. He played for Blaublitz Akita.

== Career ==
Masaya Yuma joined J3 League club Blaublitz Akita in 2016.

== Club statistics ==
Updated to 22 March 2018.

Club performance			League		Cup		Total	
Season	Club	League	Apps	Goals	Apps	Goals	Apps	Goals
Japan			League		Emperor's Cup		Total	
2016	Blaublitz Akita	J3 League	20	3	0	0	20	3
2017	Blaublitz Akita	J3 League	24	3	1	0	25	3
Total			44	6	1	0	45	6

== Honours ==
Blaublitz Akita

- J3 League (1): 2017
