= Go Daimu =

South Korean football player

Personal information
- Full name: Go Daimu
- Date of birth: September 3, 1993 (age 33)
- Place of birth: Kanagawa, Japan
- Height: 1.72 m (5 ft 7 1/2 in)
- Position: Forward

Youth career
- 2006–2008: Hirono Junior High School
- 2009–2011: Tomioka Fukushima High School

Senior career*
Years	Team	Apps	(Gls)
2012–2015	Fagiano Okayama	0	(0)
2012–2015	→ Fagiano Okayama Next (loan)	80	(14)
2016	Blaublitz Akita	25	(3)
2017	SC Sagamihara	23	(1)
- * Club domestic league appearances and goals as of 9 December 2020

Go Daimu (呉大陸; born September 3, 1993) is a South Korean football player, who played for SC Sagamihara as a forward.

== Career ==
After growing in Yokohama F. Marinos youth ranks, Go was raised in a JFA Academy from 2006 to 2011. Then he signed with Fagiano Okayama, but he never had the chance of playing in J2, so he was sent for four seasons to their reserve team, which was in JFL. In January 2016, he decided to move to Blaublitz Akita.

== Club statistics ==
Updated to 2 January 2022.

Club performance			League		Cup		Total	
Season	Club	League	Apps	Goals	Apps	Goals	Apps	Goals
Japan			League		Emperor's Cup		Total	
2012	Fagiano Okayama Next	JRL (Chugoku)	18	5	2	0	20	5
2013	Fagiano Okayama Next	JRL (Chugoku)	18	6	2	0	20	6
2014	Fagiano Okayama Next	JFL	25	2	2	0	27	2
2015	Fagiano Okayama Next	JFL	19	1	1	0	20	1
2016	Blaublitz Akita	J3 League	25	3	2	1	27	4
2017	SC Sagamihara	J3 League	23	1	-		23	1
Total			128	18	9	1	137	19
