= 2015 Blaublitz Akita season =

Blaublitz Akita
2015 season
- Chairman: Kosuke Iwase
- Manager: Shuichi Mase
- Stadium: Akigin Stadium
- J3 League: 8th
- Emperor's Cup: Second round
- Top goalscorer: Kyohei Maeyama (10)
- Highest home attendance: 3,233
- Lowest home attendance: 1,237
- Average home league attendance: 1,998 (+12.7%)
Home colours	Away colours

2015 Blaublitz Akita season. The annual club slogan was "闘".

== Squad ==
As of 2015.

Note: Flags indicate national team as defined under FIFA eligibility rules; some limited exceptions apply. Players may hold more than one non-FIFA nationality.

No.	Pos.	Nation	Player
1	GK	JPN	Toshimitsu Asai
2	DF	JPN	Colin Killoran
3	DF	JPN	Kazuhito Esaki
4	DF	JPN	Toshio Shimakawa
5	DF	JPN	Shinya Hatta
6	MF	JPN	Jumpei Saito
7	MF	JPN	Kyohei Maeyama
8	MF	JPN	Tatsuya Kumagai
9	FW	BRA	Leonardo
10	MF	JPN	Shingo Kumabayashi
11	FW	JPN	Shintaro Hirai
13	MF	JPN	Shohei Shinzato
14	MF	JPN	Kazuhiro Kawata
15	MF	JPN	Takeshi Handa

No.	Pos.	Nation	Player
16	MF	JPN	Hirochika Miyoshi
17	MF	JPN	Hayato Mine
18	MF	JPN	Kenji Suzuki
19	MF	ARG	Agustin Ortega
20	MF	JPN	Keita Makiuchi
21	GK	JPN	Takuya Matsumoto
23	GK	JPN	Takanori Miyake
24	DF	JPN	Naoyuki Yamada
25	FW	JPN	Kenta Kakimoto
25	MF	JPN	Sho Sato
33	FW	JPN	Takunosuke Funakawa
36	FW	JPN	Rei Yonezawa
43	FW	JPN	Kohei Shimoda

== J3 League ==
Match	Date	Team	Score	Team	Venue	Attendance
1	2015.03.15	Kataller Toyama	1-0	Blaublitz Akita	Toyama Stadium	4,542
3	2015.03.29	FC Machida Zelvia	0-1	Blaublitz Akita	Machida Stadium	2,853
4	2015.04.05	Blaublitz Akita	0-1	YSCC Yokohama	Akigin Stadium	3,233
5	2015.04.12	Blaublitz Akita	1-2	Renofa Yamaguchi FC	Akigin Stadium	2,281
6	2015.04.18	Fukushima United FC	1-1	Blaublitz Akita	Toho Stadium	913
7	2015.04.26	Blaublitz Akita	3-0	SC Sagamihara	Akigin Stadium	1,815
8	2015.04.29	Fujieda MYFC	0-2	Blaublitz Akita	Fujieda Soccer Stadium	812
9	2015.05.03	Blaublitz Akita	1-0	Grulla Morioka	Akigin Stadium	2,023
10	2015.05.06	FC Ryukyu	2-0	Blaublitz Akita	Okinawa Athletic Park Stadium	1,028
11	2015.05.10	Blaublitz Akita	1-2	Gainare Tottori	Akigin Stadium	3,211
12	2015.05.17	AC Nagano Parceiro	1-0	Blaublitz Akita	Minami Nagano Sports Park Stadium	3,769
13	2015.05.24	Blaublitz Akita	1-0	J.League U-22 Selection	Akigin Stadium	1,771
14	2015.05.31	Blaublitz Akita	0-1	FC Machida Zelvia	Akigin Stadium	1,237
16	2015.06.14	Blaublitz Akita	2-3	Fukushima United FC	Akigin Stadium	1,813
17	2015.06.21	SC Sagamihara	3-1	Blaublitz Akita	Sagamihara Gion Stadium	1,723
18	2015.06.28	Blaublitz Akita	1-2	AC Nagano Parceiro	Akita Yabase Athletic Field	1,751
19	2015.07.05	Renofa Yamaguchi FC	3-1	Blaublitz Akita	Ishin Memorial Park Stadium	3,514
20	2015.07.12	Blaublitz Akita	1-1	Kataller Toyama	Akigin Stadium	2,020
21	2015.07.19	FC Ryukyu	2-1	Blaublitz Akita	Okinawa Athletic Park Stadium	897
22	2015.07.26	Blaublitz Akita	1-2	Gainare Tottori	Akigin Stadium	1,610
23	2015.07.29	YSCC Yokohama	0-0	Blaublitz Akita	NHK Spring Mitsuzawa Football Stadium	585
24	2015.08.02	Blaublitz Akita	0-0	J.League U-22 Selection	Akigin Stadium	1,901
25	2015.08.09	Blaublitz Akita	0-0	Fujieda MYFC	Akigin Stadium	1,750
26	2015.08.16	Grulla Morioka	0-0	Blaublitz Akita	Morioka Minami Park Stadium	1,170
27	2015.09.06	Blaublitz Akita	3-1	Renofa Yamaguchi FC	Akigin Stadium	1,479
29	2015.09.19	Blaublitz Akita	1-0	YSCC Yokohama	Akigin Stadium	1,513
30	2015.09.23	Grulla Morioka	0-1	Blaublitz Akita	Morioka Minami Park Stadium	1,127
31	2015.09.27	Blaublitz Akita	1-0	J.League U-22 Selection	Akigin Stadium	1,692
32	2015.10.04	Kataller Toyama	0-2	Blaublitz Akita	Toyama Stadium	3,127
33	2015.10.11	Blaublitz Akita	1-1	AC Nagano Parceiro	Akigin Stadium	1,916
34	2015.10.18	Gainare Tottori	0-1	Blaublitz Akita	Chubu Yajin Stadium	2,253
35	2015.10.25	Fukushima United FC	1-2	Blaublitz Akita	Toho Stadium	1,214
36	2015.11.01	Blaublitz Akita	3-3	FC Ryukyu	Akigin Stadium	2,108
37	2015.11.08	Fujieda MYFC	3-1	Blaublitz Akita	Fujieda Soccer Stadium	1,381
38	2015.11.15	FC Machida Zelvia	2-0	Blaublitz Akita	Machida Stadium	4,487
39	2015.11.23	Blaublitz Akita	2-2	SC Sagamihara	Akigin Stadium	2,831

=== Standings ===
Pos	Team	Pld	W	D	L	GF	GA	GD	Pts	Promotion or relegation
1	Renofa Yamaguchi (C, P)	36	25	3	8	96	36	+60	78	Promotion to 2016 J2 League
2	Machida Zelvia (P)	36	23	9	4	52	18	+34	78	Qualification to J2 League promotion playoffs (Note: Only teams that hold a J2 license are eligible for promotion.)
3	Nagano Parceiro	36	21	7	8	46	28	+18	70	
4	SC Sagamihara	36	17	7	12	59	51	+8	58	
5	Kataller Toyama	36	14	10	12	37	36	+1	52	
6	Gainare Tottori	36	14	8	14	47	41	+6	50	
7	Fukushima United	36	13	10	13	42	48	−6	49	
8	Blaublitz Akita	36	12	9	15	37	40	−3	45	
9	FC Ryukyu	36	12	9	15	45	51	−6	45	
10	Fujieda MYFC	36	11	4	21	37	61	−24	37	
11	Grulla Morioka	36	8	11	17	36	47	−11	35	
12	J.League U-22 Selection (W)	36	7	7	22	28	71	−43	28	Folded by JFA after the season.
13	YSCC Yokohama	36	7	6	23	24	58	−34	27	

Updated to match(es) played on 23 November 2015. Source: JLeague.jp
Rules for classification: 1) Points; 2) Goal difference; 3) Goals scored; 4th) head-to-head results; 5th) disciplinary points; 6th) draw
(C) Champions; (P) Promoted; (W) Withdrawn

== Emperor's Cup ==
23 August 2015 Akita Prefecture Qualifying Final	Blaublitz Akita	9–0	TDK Shinwakai	Akigin Stadium
13:05	Sato 2'; Maeyama 17', 31', 80', 85'; Mine 23'; Yonezawa 51', 88'; Kumagai 81'	Report		Attendance: 457

30 August 2015 No.16	Blaublitz Akita	3 – 0	Fukushima United	Akita Municipal Yabase Football Stadium, Akita
13:00	Shimakawa 29'; Hirai 40'; Makiuchi 68'	Report		Attendance: 468; Referee: Hiroki Kasahara

9 September 2015 No.47	Albirex Niigata	4 – 0	Blaublitz Akita	Denka Big Swan Stadium, Niigata
19:03	Silva 36'; Tanaka 50', 56'; Saito 86'	Report		Attendance: 3,365; Referee: Shoichiro Mikami

== Other games ==
8 February 2015	Vanraure Hachinohe	0–0	Blaublitz Akita	Adidas Sports Park
11:00		Report

15 February 2015	Blaublitz Akita	15–0	North Asia University	Space Project Dream Field
15:30		Report

20 February 2015	Azul Claro Numazu	0–1	Blaublitz Akita	Tokinosumika Sports Center Susono C Ground
10:00		Report	Shimakawa

22 February 2015	Fujieda MYFC	0–2	Blaublitz Akita	Tokinosumika Sports Center Susono C Ground
11:00		Report; Report	Mine; Funakawa

24 February 2015	Shizuoka Sangyo University	1–4	Blaublitz Akita	Tokinosumika Sports Center Susono C Ground
11:00		Report

26 February 2015	Fukushima United	1–2	Blaublitz Akita	Tokinosumika Sports Center Susono C Ground
13:00		Report

26 February 2015	Rissho University	0–0	Blaublitz Akita	Tokinosumika Sports Center Susono C Ground
15:30		Report

7 March 2015	Blaublitz Akita	3–0	Sendai University	Nikaho Green Field
13:00		Report

22 March 2015	Blaublitz Akita	4–1	FC Ganju Iwate	Nikaho Green Field
13:00		Report

13 April 2015	Albirex Niigata	5–1	Blaublitz Akita	Niigata Seiro Sports Center
14:30		Report; Report	Funakawa

11 May 2015	Montedio Yamagata	1–0	Blaublitz Akita	Number 3 Sports Square
11:00		Report

4 June 2015	Blaublitz Akita	3–3	Japan Soccer College	Nikaho Green Field
11:00		Report

22 July 2015	Blaublitz Akita	4–0	Akita Prefecture Kokutai	Space Project Dream Field
09:00		Report

5 August 2015	Blaublitz Akita	6–2	Akita Prefecture Kokutai	Nikaho Green Field
09:00		Report

12 August 2015	Blaublitz Akita	19–0	North Asia University	Nikaho Green Field
09:30		Report

19 August 2015	Blaublitz Akita	3–1	Iwate University	Nikaho Green Field
11:00		Report

2 September 2015	Blaublitz Akita	2–0	Yamagata University	TDK Akita General Sports Center
11:00		Report

13 September 2015	Montedio Yamagata	4–0	Blaublitz Akita	Number 3 Sports Square
11:00		Report

15 September 2015	Blaublitz Akita	10–0	Japan Soccer College	Nikaho Green Field
11:00		Report

30 September 2015	Blaublitz Akita	10–0	Akita University Med	Nikaho Green Field
10:00		Report

21 October 2015	Blaublitz Akita	8–0	Hachimantai Touresor	Oga Marine Park
11:00		Report

== Gallery ==
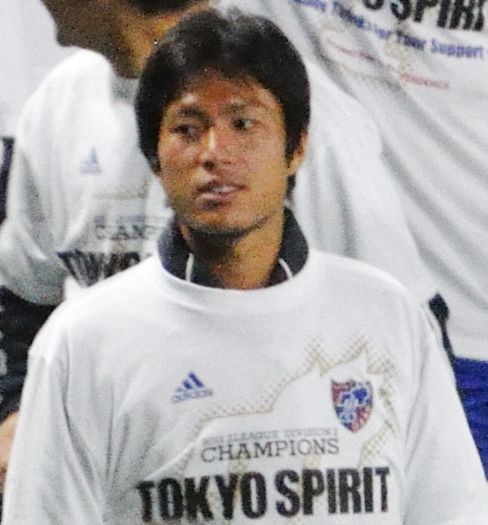
Kohei Shimoda

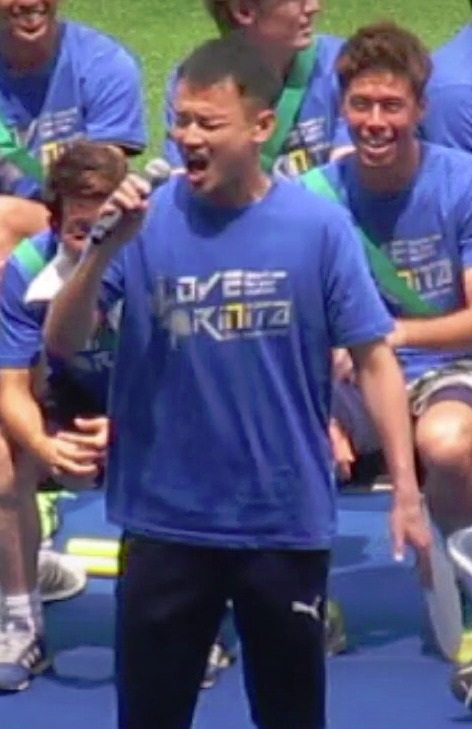
Toshio Shimakawa

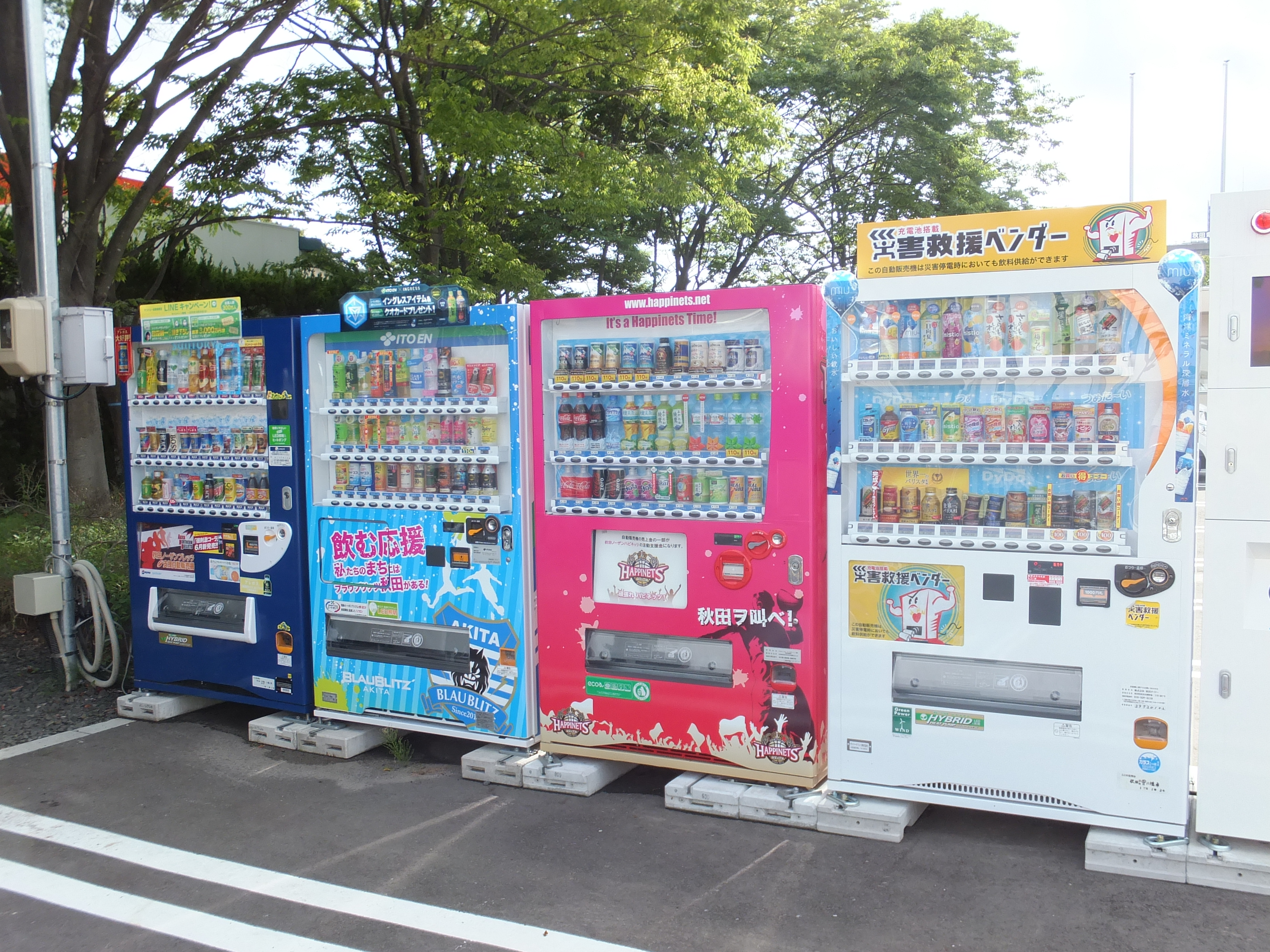
Blaublitz Vending Machine in 2015
