= Tohoku derby =

Matches played between association football clubs of Tohoku region, Japan

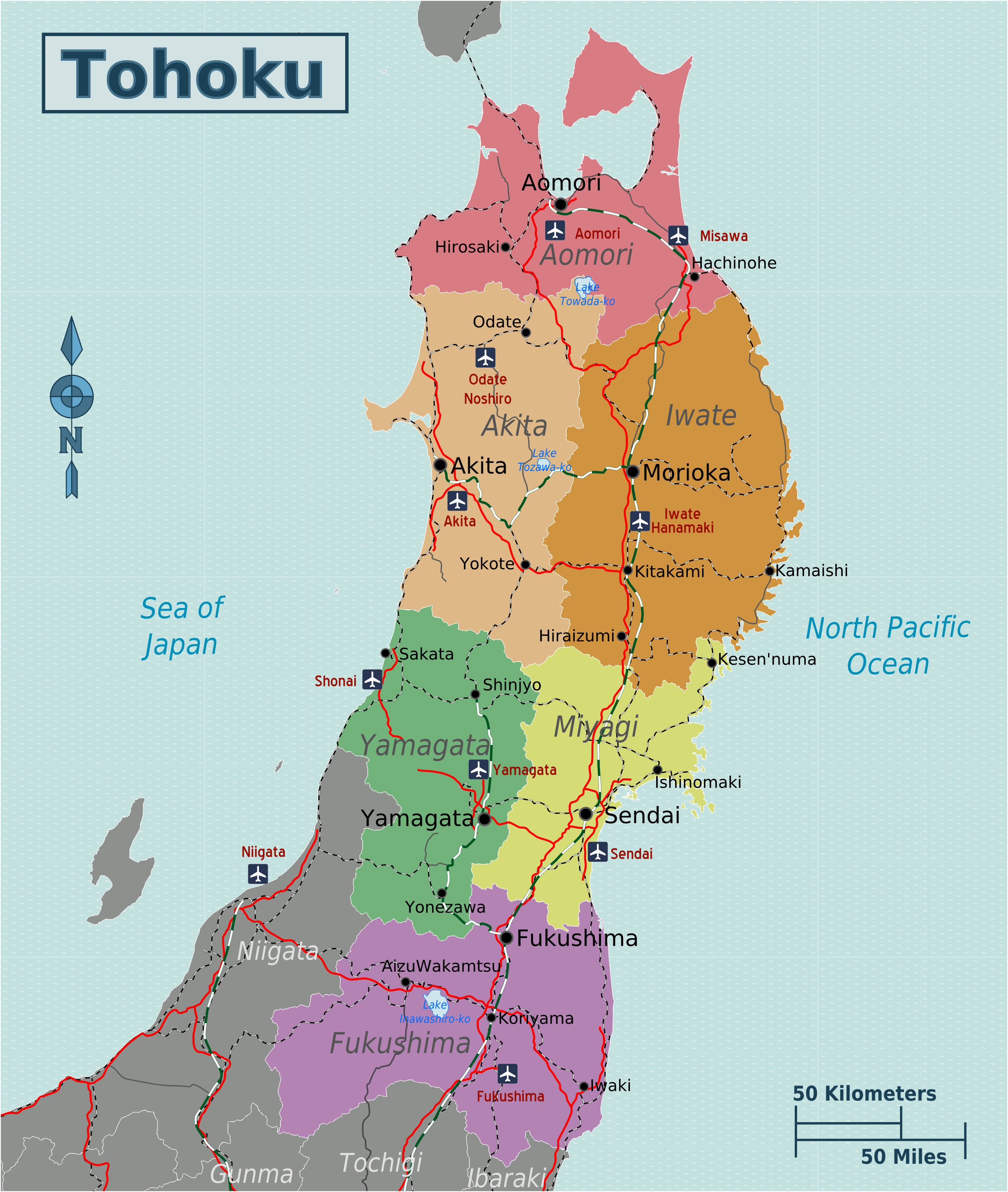
Tohoku Six Prefectures

Tohoku derby (東北ダービー) refers to matches played between professional football clubs of Tohoku region, Japan. This area consists of six prefectures and such clubs include Vanraure Hachinohe, Iwate Grulla Morioka, Vegalta Sendai, Blaublitz Akita, Montedio Yamagata, Fukushima United FC, and Iwaki FC. Historically, the most significant are games which were played between Vegalta and Montedio (Michinoku derby), the two most successful of Tohoku's football clubs. The Blaublitz vs Montedio derby is called Ōu Honsen and played in the former Dewa Province. The Nambu derby is a football rivalry between Vanraure and Grulla, both teams are based in old Nambu domain territory. The Fukushima derby is the match in the Prefecture, between Fukushima United and Iwaki FC.

== Tohoku derby Akita vs Sendai ==
Tohoku derby Akita vs Sendai
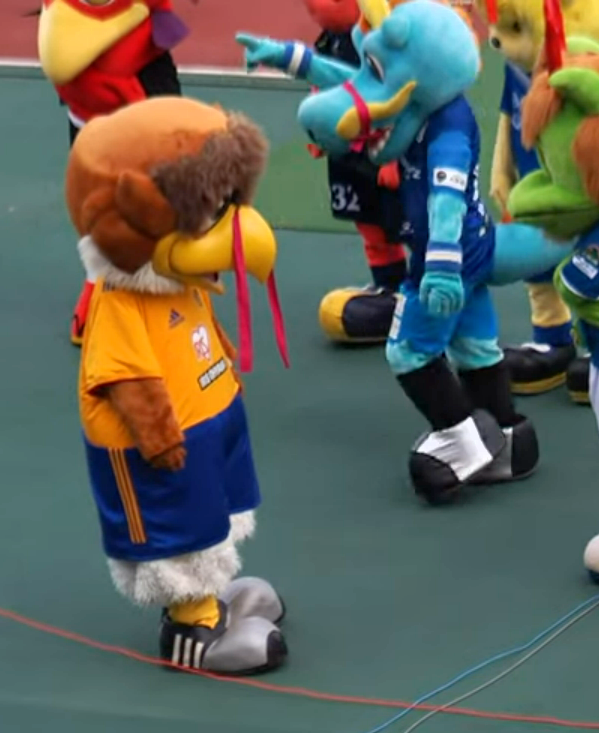
- Mascot Vegatta and Blaugon

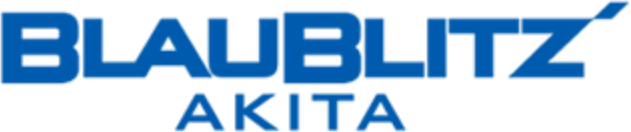
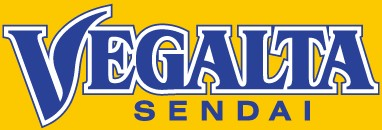
- TDK Tohoku Electric Power Blaublitz Akita Vegalta Sendai
- Other names: Kurikoma derby
- Location: (Japan) Akita Prefecture (Japan) Miyagi Prefecture
- Teams: Blaublitz Akita; Vegalta Sendai
- First meeting: Tohoku Electric Power 3–0 TDK (1991)
- Latest meeting: Sendai 1-3 Akita; 100 Year (1 May 2026)
- Next meeting: 15 November 2026
- Broadcasters: Akita Broadcasting System
- Stadiums: Yurtec Stadium Sendai; Soyu Stadium

Statistics
- Total meetings: 18
- Most wins: Vegalta Sendai 13
- All-time series: Sendai: 13; Drawn: 5 Akita:3
- Largest victory: Sendai 8–0 Akita; 1994 Tohoku Soccer League
- Location of the two teams' stadia in Tohoku Region

Home kit
Akita Home colours	Sendai Home colours

The Tohoku derby Akita vs Sendai, also referred to as the Kurikoma derby, is a footballing rivalry played between Blaublitz Akita and Vegalta Sendai, both professional J.League teams from the cities in the Tohoku, Japan. The latest meeting between the two sides took place on 3 May 2023, and ended in a draw attracting a crowd of 15,026.

=== Historical Background ===
The sports rivalry between Akita and Sendai likely originated from the Boshin Civil War and battles that lasted for months, which later expanded into football and basketball. On 4 July 1868, 12 Sendai feudal retainers in their lodgins were killed by impetuous young samurai from Akita and their heads were mounted for display on Kawabata's bridge in Kubota, Akita. This incident caused the Akita War. Sendai had been the largest municipality in the Ōshū, on the other hand, Akita had been the capital of Ushū with the Ōu's largest port of Tsuchizaki.

=== Stadiums ===
The game is usually hosted at Soyu Stadium and Yurtec Stadium Sendai. The two stadiums are approximately 170 km (106 miles) apart. Sendai is the largest city in the Ou region and the venues draw large home attendance.

Team Name	Stadium	Capacity	Image
Blaublitz Akita	Soyu Stadium	20,125	
Blaublitz Akita	TDK Akita General Sports Center		one
Blaublitz Akita	Mizubayashi Athletic Field	10,000	
Vegalta Sendai	Yurtec Stadium Sendai	19,5265	
Vegalta Sendai	Miyagi Soccer Field	10,000	
Vegalta Sendai	Miyagi Athletic Stadium	30,000	

=== Past results ===
Sendai overwhelmed the derby with 12 victories against Akita's 1 in the official meetings.

Statistics as of 3 May 2023

Tournament	GP	Akita wins	Draws	Sendai wins	Goal diff
Tohoku League	8	0	2	6	9 - 30
J2 League	10	2	5	3	7 - 8
Emperor's Cup Preliminary	2	1	0	1	1 - 5
Zensha Preliminary	3	0	0	3	2 - 14
Total	23	3	5	13	19 - 57

==== Tohoku Soccer League ====
In 1980s TDK SC based in Nikaho, Akita joined the Japan Soccer League 2 and were relegated from the second tier. The derby was first contested in 1991 when Sendai club, Tohoku Electric Power, was promoted to Tohoku Soccer League. The two teams did not play each other in the league again until the 2022 J2 League season after Sendai's relegation.

Season	Date	(Stage/)Week		Location	Home	Score	Away	Attendance
1991	-	T	-	Miyagi Prefecture	Tohoku Electric Power	3 - 0	TDK	-
1991	-	T	-	Akita Prefecture	TDK	0 - 0	Tohoku Electric Power	-
1992	-	T	-	Miyagi Prefecture	Tohoku Electric Power	4 - 1	TDK	-
1992	-	T	-	Akita Prefecture	TDK	2 - 4	Tohoku Electric Power	-
1993	-	T	-	Miyagi Prefecture	Tohoku Electric Power	5 - 3	TDK	-
1993	-	T	-	Akita Prefecture	TDK	2 - 2	Tohoku Electric Power	-
1994	31 July	T	-	Miyagi Prefecture	Tohoku Electric Power	8 - 0	TDK	-
1994	4 June	T	-	Yuri District	TDK	1 - 4	Tohoku Electric Power	-

==== Emperor's Cup Tohoku Preliminaries ====
The derby was also played twice in the Emperor's Cup Tohoku Preliminaries.

Season	Date	(Stage/)Week	Venue	Home	Score	Away	Attendance
1994	16 October	Semi final	Gonohe Hibarino Park	Tohoku Electric Power	0-1	TDK	
1995	11 November	Semi final	Yuwa, Akita	TDK	0-5	Brummell Sendai	80

==== Zensha Tohoku Preliminaries ====
Season	Date	(Stage/)Week	Venue	Home	Score	Away	Attendance
1991	10 August	Quarter finals	Hachinohe	Tohoku Electric Power	5-2	TDK	
1992	15 September	Quarter finals	Yuwa	TDK	0-3	Tohoku Electric Power	
1993	11 September	Quarter finals	Tsuruoka	Tohoku Electric Power	6-0	TDK	

==== J2 League ====
The clubs met again in the J2 League, after Sendai got relegated from J1 League, the top tier. The series occurs twice a year, with each team hosting one match. Both sides have met a total of 4 times which resulted in 2 victories for Sendai, 2 draws, and 0 victories for Akita in the second tier.

Season	Date	(Stage/)Week		Venue	Home	Score	Away	Attendance
2022	1 May	J2	13	Yurtec Stadium Sendai	Vegalta Sendai	3 - 1	Blaublitz Akita	9,612
2022	23 October	J2	42	Soyu Stadium	Blaublitz Akita	0 - 0	Vegalta Sendai	5,404
2023	3 May	J2	13	Yurtec Stadium Sendai	Vegalta Sendai	2 - 2	Blaublitz Akita	15,026
2023	22 October	J2	39	Soyu Stadium	Blaublitz Akita	0 - 1	Vegalta Sendai	4,178
2024	16 March	J2	4	Soyu Stadium	Blaublitz Akita	0 - 0	Vegalta Sendai	6,256
2024	6 October	J2	34	Yurtec Stadium Sendai	Vegalta Sendai	0-1	Blaublitz Akita	13,477
2025	4 April	J2	8	Yurtec Stadium Sendai	Vegalta Sendai	1-0	Blaublitz Akita	11,556
2025	22 November	J2	37	Soyu Stadium	Blaublitz Akita	0 - 0	Vegalta Sendai	13,172
2026	28 March	100 Year	8	Soyu Stadium	Blaublitz Akita	0-0 (10-11)	Vegalta Sendai	6,079
2026	1 May	100 Year	14	Yurtec Stadium Sendai	Vegalta Sendai	1-3	Blaublitz Akita	16,039
2026-27	14 Nov	J2	17	Yurtec Stadium Sendai	Vegalta Sendai	vs	Blaublitz Akita	
2026-27	27 March	J2		Soyu Stadium	Blaublitz Akita	vs	Vegalta Sendai	

==== Friendlies ====
11 September 2016	Vegalta Sendai	2-0	Blaublitz Akita	Sendai, Miyagi
14:00	Trainee 39'; Nishimura 78'	Report report		Stadium: Murasakiyama Field

13 March 2023	Vegalta Sendai	2-4	Blaublitz Akita	Sendai, Miyagi
13:00	Kida 26'; Trainee 60'	Report; Report; Report	Niwa 6'; Kajiya 10'; Yoshida 64' 69'	Stadium: Iris Training Field

=== Players who have played for both clubs ===
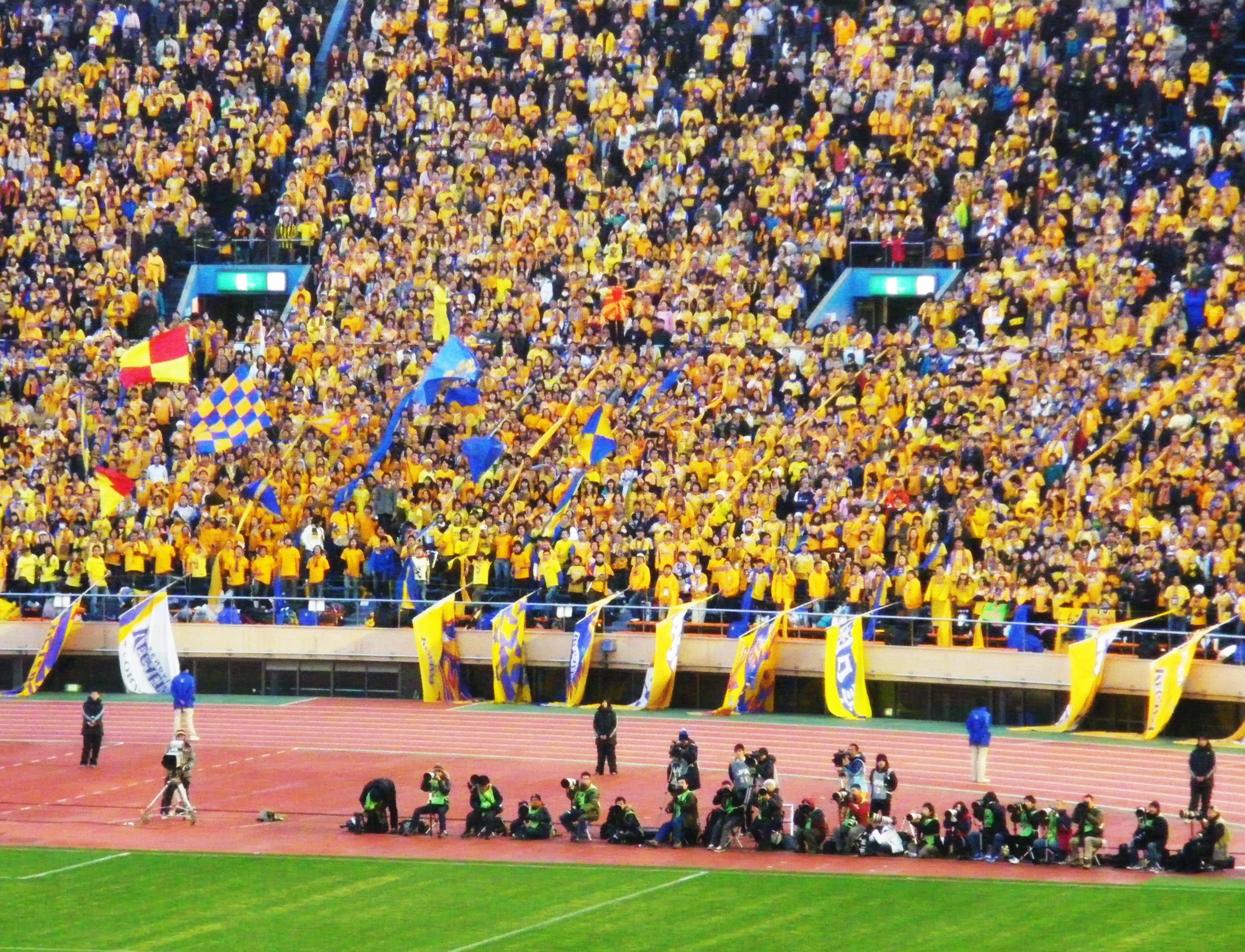
Sendai fans

- (Japan) Koji Hachisuka (S: 2012–2023, A: 2024-)
- (Japan) Ryutaro Iio (S: 2019–2020, A: 2021-2023)
- (Japan) Shingo Kumabayashi (S: 2006–2007, A: 2013–2015)
- (Philippines) Satoshi Otomo (S: 2000–2002, A: 2006)
- (Japan) Toshio Shimakawa (S: 2009–2013, A: 2012–2015)
- (Japan) Ryota Takada (A: 2022–2023, S: 2024-)

== Tohoku derby Akita vs Iwate ==
Kita-Tohoku derby Akita vs Iwate
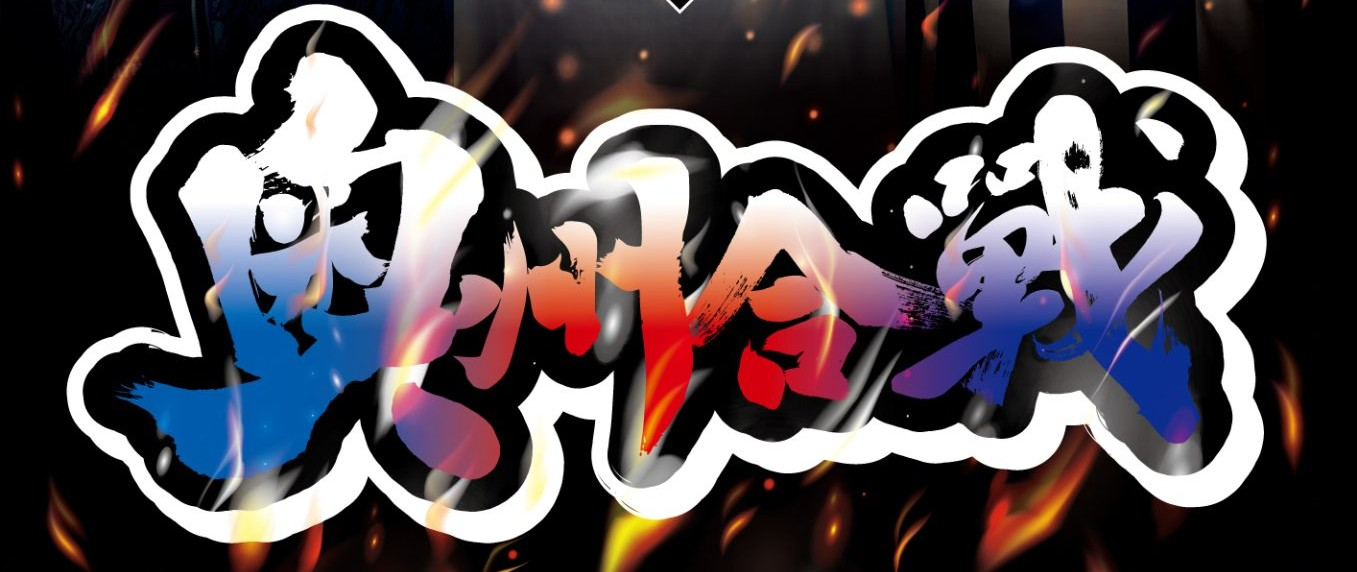
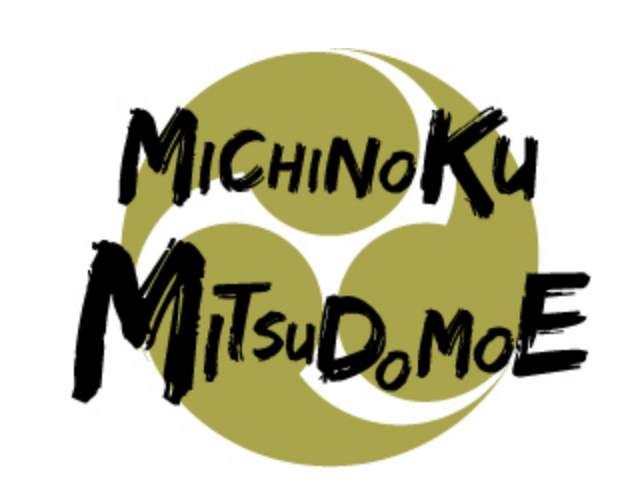
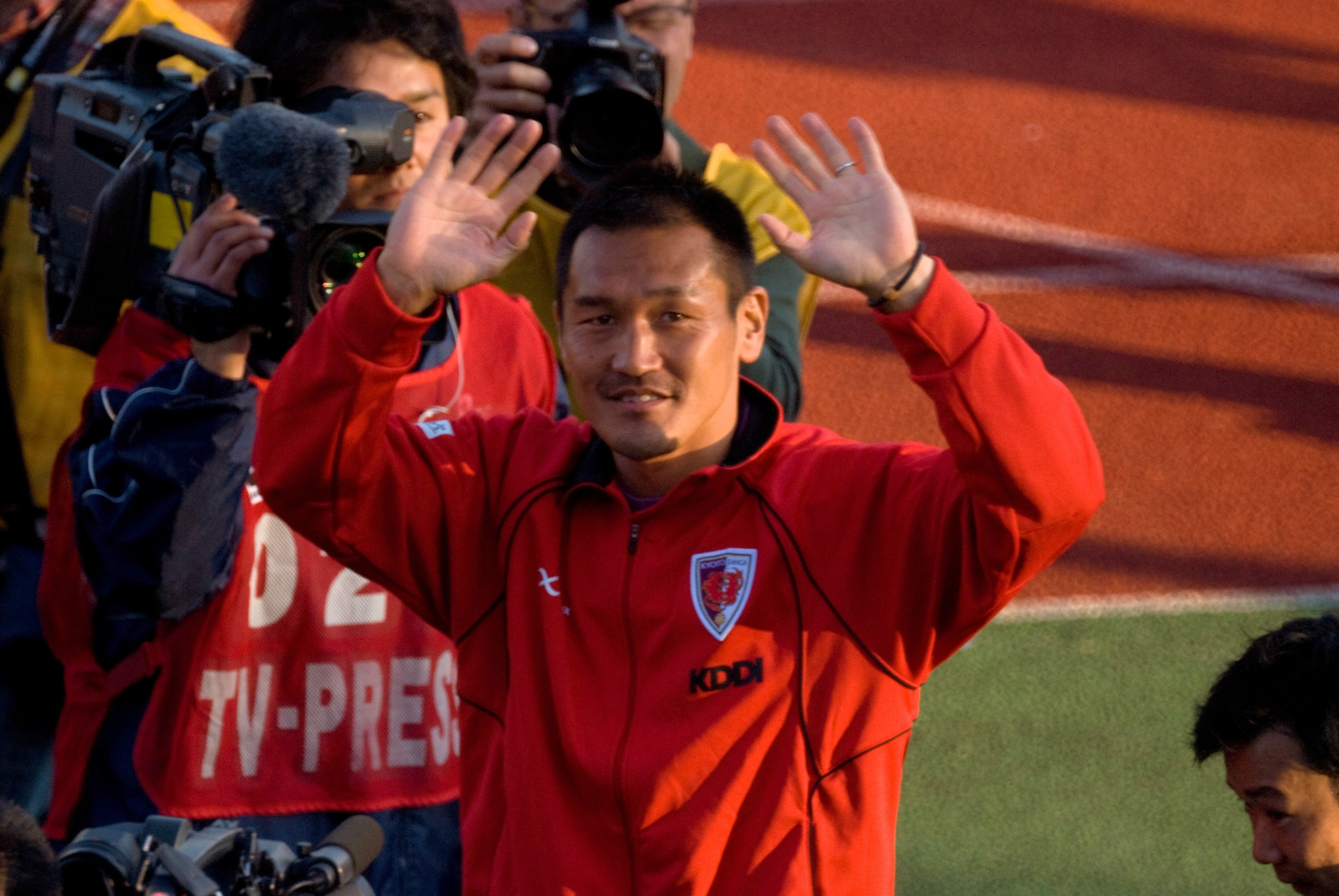
- Oshu logo/Mitsudomoe logo/President Yutaka Akita of Iwate Grulla Morioka

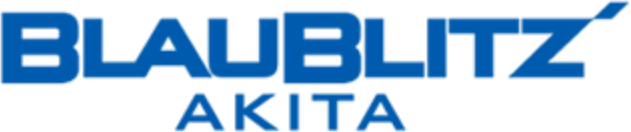
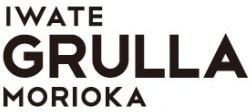
- Blaublitz Akita Iwate Grulla Morioka
- Other names: Ōshū Kassen; Michinoku Mitsudomoe
- Location: (Japan) Akita Prefecture (Japan) Iwate Prefecture
- Teams: Blaublitz Akita; Iwate Grulla Morioka
- First meeting: TDK 1–2 Grulla Morioka (2005)
- Latest meeting: Iwate 0 - 1 Akita; J2League (13 August 2022)
- Next meeting: TBC
- Broadcasters: NHK Akita Station; NHK Iwate Station
- Stadiums: Iwagin Stadium; Soyu Stadium

Statistics
- Total meetings: 22
- Most wins: Akita 15
- All-time series: Iwate: 5 Drawn: 2 Akita:15
- Largest victory: Iwate 0–4 Akita; 2020 J3 League iwate 0-4 Akita; 2006 Tohoku Soccer League

Home kit
Akita Home colours	Iwate Home colours

The Tohoku derby Akita vs Iwate, also known as the Kita-Tohoku derby, the Ōshū Kassen, and Michinoku Mitsudomoe, is a local derby contested between the Japanese J.League's two north-Tohoku-based clubs, Blaublitz Akita and Iwate Grulla Morioka. It is also a confusing fact that the surname of Iwate's ex-manager and president is Akita. Derby spectators wore Yutaka-Akita-faced cardboard masks on 13 August 2022.

=== Stadiums ===
The game is usually hosted at Soyu Stadium and Iwagin Stadium. The two stadiums are roughly 90 km (56 miles) apart. New LED night lighting equipments were set to be installed at Iwasuta in 2020.

Team Name	Stadium	Capacity	Image
Blaublitz Akita	Soyu Stadium	20,125	
Blaublitz Akita	Akigin Stadium	4,992	
Blaublitz Akita	TDK Akita General Sports Center		
Blaublitz Akita	Nikaho Green Field	4,430	
Iwate Grulla Morioka	Iwagin Stadium	4,946 x 2	

=== Past results ===
There have a been a total of 22 matches between both the teams with Akita and Morioka winning fifteen and five matches respectively and two games ended in a draw.

Statistics as of 20 Oct 2026

Tournament	Akita wins	Draws	Iwate wins	Goal diff
Tohoku Soccer League	3	0	1	10 - 5
J3 League	10	2	4	25 - 17
J2 League	2	0	0	4 - 1
Total	15	2	5	39 - 23

==== Tohoku Soccer League ====
The derby was first contested in 2005 when Morioka club was promoted to Tohoku Soccer League 1st division.

Season	Date	(Stage/)Week		Location	Home	Score	Away	Attendance
2005	1 May	T	1	TDK Akita General Sports Center	TDK	1 - 2	Grulla Morioka	-
2005	3 July	T	8	Morioka Minami Park Stadium	Grulla Morioka	1 - 2	TDK	-
2006	25 June	T	7	Morioka Minami Park Stadium	Grulla Morioka	2 - 3	TDK	-
2006	30 July	T	10	Nikaho Green Field	TDK	4 - 0	Grulla Morioka	2,300

==== J3 League ====
The clubs met again in the newly formed J3 League in 2014.

Season	Date	(Stage/)Week		Venue	Home	Score	Away	Attendance
2014	13 May	J3	6	Yabase Playing Field	Blaublitz Akita	2-1	Grulla Morioka	1,523
2014	1 June	J3	14	Morioka Minami Park Stadium	Grulla Morioka	3-0	Blaublitz Akita	1,430
2014	2 November	J3	30	Akigin Stadium	Blaublitz Akita	1-3	Grulla Morioka	2,187
2015	3 May	J3	8	Akigin Stadium	Blaublitz Akita	1-0	Grulla Morioka	1,731
2015	16 August	J3	26	Morioka Minami Park Stadium	Grulla Morioka	0-0	Blaublitz Akita	1,170
2015	23 September	J3	30	Morioka Minami Park Stadium	Grulla Morioka	0-1	Blaublitz Akita	1,127
2016	24 April	J3	6	Iwagin Stadium	Grulla Morioka	1-1	Blaublitz Akita	1,076
2016	2 October	J3	24	Akigin Stadium	Blaublitz Akita	2-0	Grulla Morioka	2,981
2017	2 April	J3	4	Akigin Stadium	Blaublitz Akita	1-0	Grulla Morioka	2,100
2017	10 September	J3	22	Iwagin Stadium	Grulla Morioka	1-3	Blaublitz Akita	1,217
2018	8 April	J3	6	Iwagin Stadium	Grulla Morioka	2-1	Blaublitz Akita	955
2018	2 September	J3	21	Akigin Stadium	Blaublitz Akita	2-1	Grulla Morioka	2,114
2019	24 March	J3	3	Iwagin Stadium	Iwate Grulla Morioka	3-1	Blaublitz Akita	2,084
2019	27 July	J3	18	Soyu Stadium	Blaublitz Akita	3-1	Iwate Grulla Morioka	1,289
2020	27 June	J3	1	Iwagin Stadium	Iwate Grulla Morioka	0-4	Blaublitz Akita	0
2020	3 October	J3	19	Soyu Stadium	Blaublitz Akita	2-1	Iwate Grulla Morioka	977

==== J2 League ====
The most recent meeting saw Akita win 1–0 in August 2022 at the Iwagin Stadium. The two teams are currently separated due to Iwate's relegation from the J2 League at the end of the 2022 season.

Season	Date	(Stage/)Week		Venue	Home	Score	Away	Attendance
2022	3 April	J2	8	Soyu Stadium	Blaublitz Akita	3-1	Iwate Grulla Morioka	1,903
2022	13 August	J2	31	Iwagin Stadium	Iwate Grulla Morioka	0-1	Blaublitz Akita	1,542

==== Friendlies ====
They have competed more than 4 practice games together.

10 November 2010	Blaublitz Akita	1–1	Grulla Morioka	Nikaho, Akita
		Report		Stadium: TDK Akita General Sports Center

4 June 2016	Blaublitz Akita	2–2	Grulla Morioka	Nikaho, Akita
11:00	Tanaka; Hatanaka	Report; Report; Report	Taniguchi; Morita	Stadium: TDK Akita General Sports Center

25 March 2019	Blaublitz Akita	0-1	Iwate Grulla Morioka	Katagami, Akita
		Report	Kushida	Stadium: Akita Prefecture Football Centre

3 September 2023	Blaublitz Akita	3–0	Iwate Grulla Morioka	Katagami, Akita
11:00	Kajiya; Own goal R. Saito	Report; Report		Stadium: Katagami Soccer Ground

=== Players who have played for both clubs ===
- (Japan) Shuhei Fukai (A:2016-2018, I: 2019)
- (Japan) Takumu Fujinuma (I:2018, A: 2019)
- (Japan) Futoshi Harada (I:2005, A: 2006)
- (Japan) Daiki Kogure (A: 2022-2023, I: 2024-)
- (Japan) Hiroki Kotani (I: 2018, 2020, A: 2019)
- (Japan) Taro Sugahara (I: 2007–2008, 2014, A: 2009–2010, 2013)
- (Japan) Masashi Wada (A:2019, I: 2021-2024)

== Tohoku derby Akita vs Iwaki ==
Tohoku derby Akita vs Iwaki
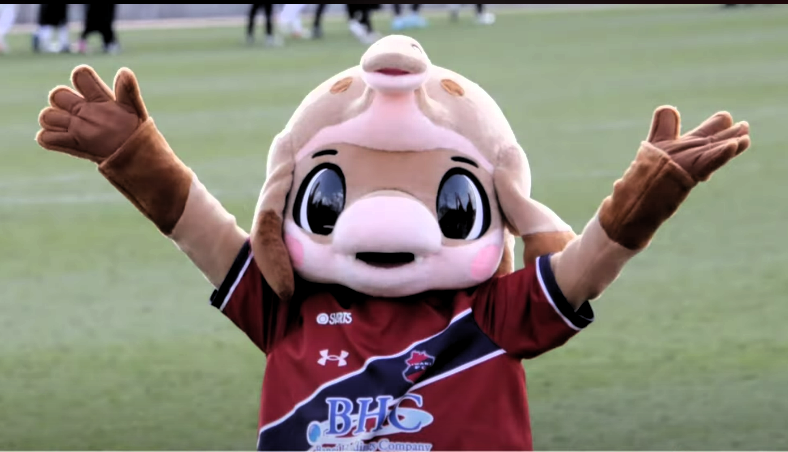
- Iwaki's mascot Hama

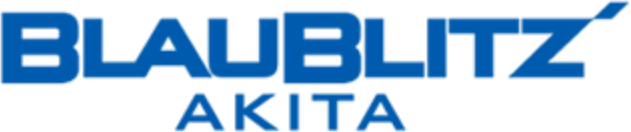
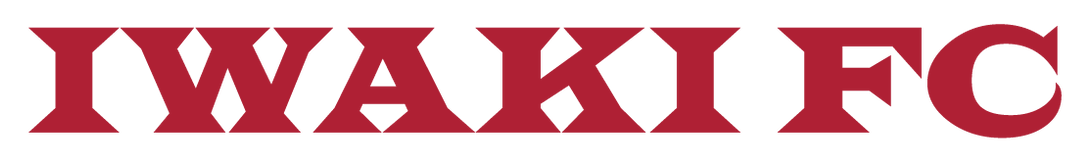
- Blaublitz Akita Iwaki FC
- Location: (Japan) Akita Prefecture (Japan) Fukushima Prefecture
- Teams: Blaublitz Akita; Iwaki FC
- First meeting: Iwaki FC 0–1 Blaublitz Akita (2023)
- Latest meeting: Iwaki 1-0 Akita; J2League (11 Oct 2026)
- Next meeting: 13 March 2026
- Broadcasters: NHK Fukushima Station & Akita Station
- Stadiums: Hawaiians Stadium Iwaki; Soyu Stadium

Statistics
- Total meetings: 9
- Most wins: Akita 4
- All-time series: Iwaki: 3 Drawn: 2 Akita:4
- Largest victory: Akita 2–0 Iwaki; 2025 J2 League

Home kit
Akita Home colours	Iwaki Home colours

Football matches between Blaublitz Akita and Iwaki FC are described as the Tohoku derby Akita vs Iwaki. It is a match between two cities located in Northeast region. This rivalry is also known as Iwaki derby, stretching back to Iwaki, Akita (Yurihonjo) and Iwaki, Fukushima's historical Iwaki clan connection. Iwaki's Riku Saga was raised in Katagami, Akita and Yukihito Kajiya of Blaublitz played for Iwaki Astron FC in his youth.

=== Venues ===
The game is usually hosted at Soyu Stadium and Hawaiians Stadium Iwaki. The two stadiums are approximately 312 km (194 miles) apart. Greenfield was renovated to meet J.League stadium standard in 2023. New spectator seats, new night lighting towers, large video equipment, doping inspection room and press seats were installed and total renewal costs were JPY 1.7 billion.

	Stadium	Capacity	Image
Blaublitz Akita	Soyu Stadium	20,125	
Iwaki FC	Hawaiians Stadium Iwaki	5,600	

=== Past results ===
Statistics as of 20 Oct 2026

Tournament	GP	Akita wins	Draws	Iwaki wins	Goal diff
J2 League	7	3	2	2	6 - 5
Emperor's Cup	2	1	0	1	2 - 3
Total	9	4	2	3	8 - 8

==== J2 League ====
The derby was first played on 14 May 2023 when Iwaki club was promoted to J2 League. The match was televised by NHK throughout two prefectures utilizing the On-set virtual production.

Season	Date	(Stage/)Week		Venue	Home	Score	Away	Attendance
2023	14 May	J2	14	Iwaki Greenfield Stadium	Iwaki FC	0-1	Blaublitz Akita	2,458
2023	2 July	J2	23	Soyu Stadium	Blaublitz Akita	1-1	Iwaki FC	2,181
2024	30 March	J2	7	Soyu Stadium	Blaublitz Akita	1-0	Iwaki FC	2,509
2024	4 August	J2	25	Hawaiians Stadium Iwaki	Iwaki FC	2-0	Blaublitz Akita	3,900
2025	3 May	J2	13	Hawaiians Stadium Iwaki	Iwaki FC	1-1	Blaublitz Akita	4,109
2025	9 Nov	J2	36	Soyu Stadium	Blaublitz Akita	2-0	Iwaki FC	3,021
2026-27	11 Oct	J2	10	Hawaiians Stadium Iwaki	Iwaki FC	1-0	Blaublitz Akita	4,507
2026-27	13 March	J2		Soyu Stadium	Blaublitz Akita	vs	Iwaki FC	

==== Emperor's Cup ====
Season	Date	(Stage/)Week	Venue	Home	Score	Away	Attendance
2024	12 June	2nd round	Soyu Stadium	Blaublitz Akita	0-2	Iwaki FC	872
2025	11 June	2nd round	Hawaiians Stadium Iwaki	Iwaki FC	1-2	Blaublitz Akita	1,797

==== Friendlies ====
They have competed more than 4 practice games together.

2016-05-04	Blaublitz Akita	3-0	Iwaki FC	Akita, Akita
	Maeyama; Hatanaka; Tanaka	Report; Report; Report		Stadium: Akigin Stadium

2017-03-05	Blaublitz Akita	1-1	Iwaki FC	Nikaho, Akita
		Report; Report		Stadium: Nikaho Green Field

2018-03-03	Blaublitz Akita	1-2	Iwaki FC	Nikaho, Akita
		Report; Report		Stadium: TDK Akita General Sports Center

2019-01-26	Iwaki FC	0-4	Blaublitz Akita	Hirono, Fukushima
		Report; Report	Wada; Kotani; Hayashi; Hori	Stadium: J-Village Stadium

=== Players who have played for both clubs ===
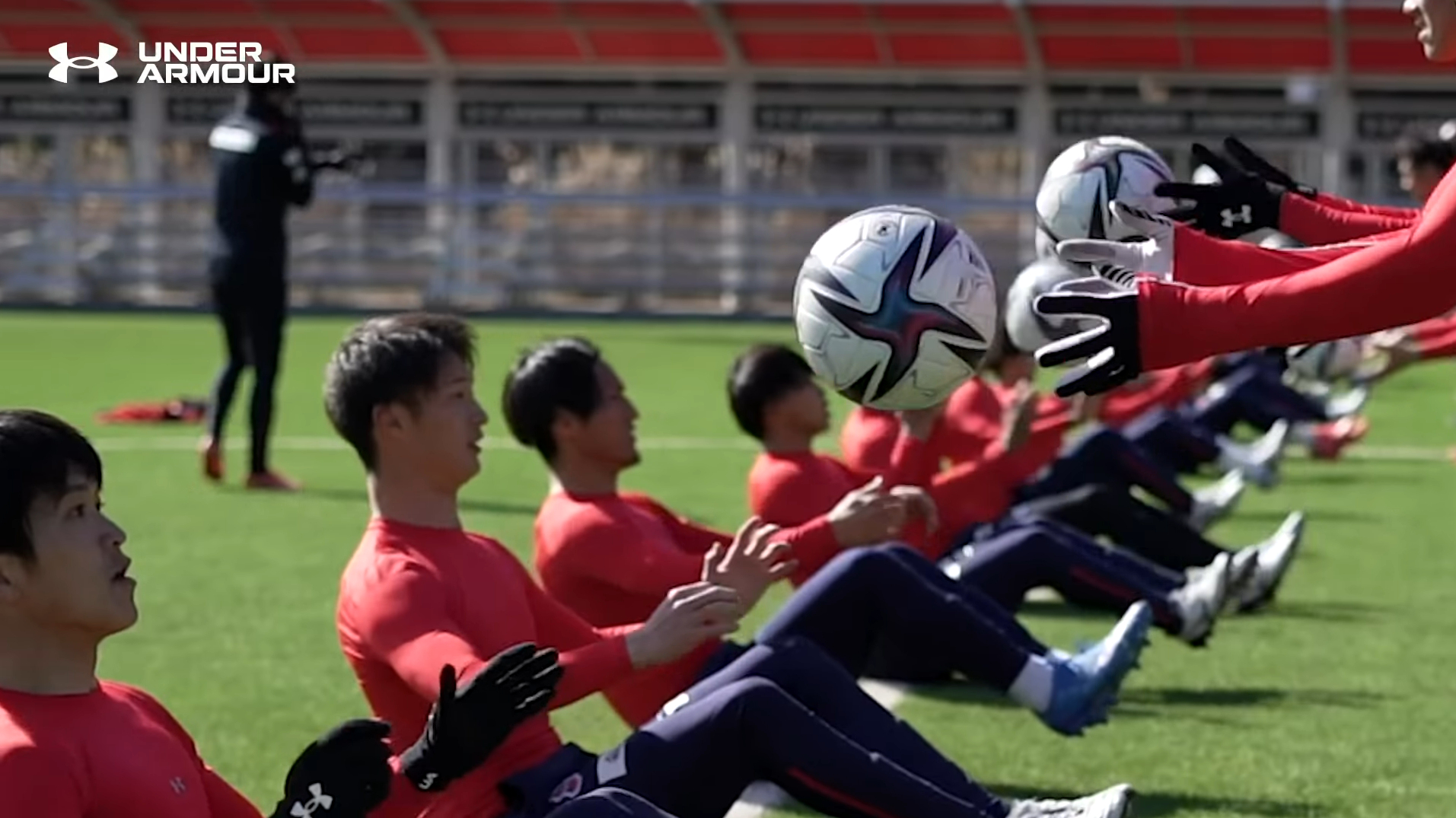
Iwaki FC practice

- (Japan) (Democratic Republic of the Congo) Kyowaan Hoshi (I: 2022, A: 2023-)

== Tohoku derby Akita vs Fukushima ==
Tohoku derby Akita vs Fukushima
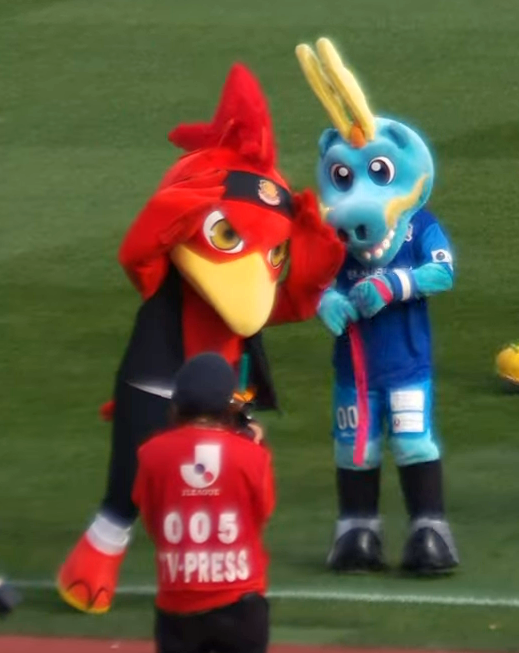
- Mascot Hinosuke Fukushima and Blaugon at Toho Stadium

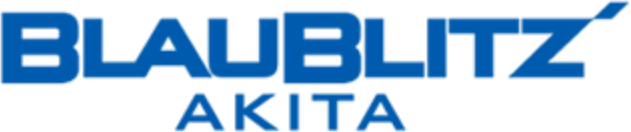
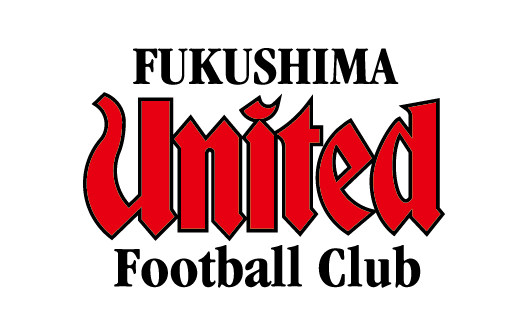
- Blaublitz Akita Fukushima United FC
- Other names: Michinoku Mitsudomoe
- Location: (Japan) Akita Prefecture (Japan) Fukushima Prefecture
- Teams: Blaublitz Akita; Fukushima United FC
- First meeting: Fukushima United FC 2 – 3 Blaublitz Akita (2013)
- Latest meeting: Fukushima U 0 - 2 Akita; J3 League (26 September 2020)
- Next meeting: TBC
- Stadiums: Toho Stadium; Soyu Stadium

Statistics
- Total meetings: 19
- Most wins: Blaublitz Akita 11
- All-time series: Fukushima U: 5 Draws: 3 Akita:11
- Largest victory: Fukushima U 0– 3 Akita; Emperor's Cup 2015

Home kit
Akita Home colours	Fukushima U Home colours

Tohoku derby Akita vs Fukushima, also referred to as the Michinoku Mitsudomoe, is an inter-Tohoku soccer rivalry between Blaublitz Akita and Fukushima United FC. Akita was promoted to J2 League and the matches were discontinued in 2020. Keita Saito, Hayate Take and Hiroto Morooka suited up for both sides.

=== Attendance records ===
The record for a Blaublitz home match is 10,607, set on 25 March 2018, when the Fukushima United defeated Akita 1–0 with a goal by Nildo at Yabase Athletic Stadium.

=== Venues ===
The game is usually hosted at Soyu Stadium and Toho Stadium. The two stadiums are roughly 223 km (135 miles) apart. Toho is the largest athletic stadium in the prefecture and four 54-meter-tall LED-bulb light steel towers are installed to Tousuta in 2022.

Team Name	Stadium	Capacity	Image
Blaublitz Akita	Soyu Stadium	20,125	
Blaublitz Akita	Akigin Stadium	4,992	
Blaublitz Akita	Nikaho Green Field	4,430	
Fukushima United FC	Toho Stadium	21,000	
Fukushima United FC	J-Village Stadium	5,413	
Fukushima United FC	Shinobugaoka Stadium	16,400	

=== Past results ===
There have a been a total of 19 matches between both the teams with Akita and Fukushima winning eleven and five matches respectively and three games ended in a draw.

Statistics as of 12 May 2023

Tournament	Akita wins	Draws	Fukushima U wins	Goal diff
JFL	2	0	0	4 - 2
J3 League	8	3	5	22 - 15
Emperor's Cup	1	0	0	3 - 0
Total	11	3	5	29 - 17

==== JFL ====
The two clubs faced each other for the first time in 2013 when Fukushima City club was promoted to Japan Football League.

Season	Date	(Stage/)Week		Location	Home	Score	Away	Attendance
2013	26 May	JFL	13	Shinobugaoka Stadium	Fukushima United FC	2 - 3	Blaublitz Akita	990
2013	3 August	JFL	23	Nikaho Green Field	Blaublitz Akita	1 - 0	Fukushima United FC	1,103

==== J3 League ====
Season	Date	(Stage/)Week		Location	Home	Score	Away	Attendance
2014	23 March	J3	2	Yabase Playing Field	Blaublitz Akita	2 - 2	Fukushima United FC	1,807
2014	8 June	J3	15	Yabase Playing Field	Blaublitz Akita	0 - 1	Fukushima United FC	1,173
2014	5 October	J3	27	Toho Stadium	Fukushima United FC	2 - 0	Blaublitz Akita	987
2015	18 April	J3	6	Toho Stadium	Fukushima United FC	1 - 1	Blaublitz Akita	913
2015	14 June	J3	16	Akigin Stadium	Blaublitz Akita	2 - 3	Fukushima United FC	1,561
2015	25 October	J3	27	Toho Stadium	Fukushima United FC	1 - 2	Blaublitz Akita	1,214
2016	13 March	J3	1	Toho Stadium	Fukushima United FC	1 - 1	Blaublitz Akita	2,136
2016	24 September	J3	23	Akigin Stadium	Blaublitz Akita	2 - 1	Fukushima United FC	2,000
2017	14 May	J3	8	Toho Stadium	Fukushima United FC	0 - 2	Blaublitz Akita	1,494
2017	19 November	J3	23	Akigin Stadium	Blaublitz Akita	2 - 1	Fukushima United FC	2,075
2018	25 March	J3	4	Yabase Athletic Stadium	Blaublitz Akita	0 - 1	Fukushima United FC	10,607
2018	25 October	J3	33	Toho Stadium	Fukushima United FC	0 - 2	Blaublitz Akita	2,416
2019	2 June	J3	10	Soyu Stadium	Blaublitz Akita	0 - 2	Fukushima United FC	955
2019	19 October	J3	27	J-Village Stadium	Fukushima United FC	1 - 2	Blaublitz Akita	436
2020	4 July	J3	2	Soyu Stadium	Blaublitz Akita	2 - 0	Fukushima United FC	0
2020	26 September	J3	27	Toho Stadium	Fukushima United FC	0 - 2	Blaublitz Akita	644

==== Emperor's Cup ====
The derby was also played once in the Emperor's Cup. Akita ripped apart Fukushima to win 3–0 in the match, Shimakawa, Hirai and Makiuchi all scored.

Season	Date	(Stage/)Week	Venue	Home	Score	Away	Attendance
2015	30 August	1st rd	Akigin Stadium	Blaublitz Akita	3-0	Fukushima United FC	468

=== Friendlies ===
They have competed more than 6 practice games together.

2008-03-01	Fukushima United FC	1–2	TDK	Hirono, Fukushima
				Stadium: J-Village Stadium

2010-02-28	Fukushima United FC	2–4	Blaublitz Akita	Hirono, Fukushima
				Stadium: J-Village Stadium

2010-11-04	Blaublitz Akita	1–2	Fukushima United FC	Nikaho, Akita
		Report	Kobayashi; Kim	Stadium: TDK Akita General Sports Center

2011-03-01	Fukushima United FC	1–2	Blaublitz Akita	Hirono, Fukushima
		Report		Stadium: J-Village Stadium

2012-03-04	Blaublitz Akita	4–1	Fukushima United FC	Nikaho, Akita
		Report		Stadium: Nikaho Green Field

2015-02-26	Fukushima United FC	1–2	Blaublitz Akita	Gotemba, Shizuoka
13:00		Report		Stadium: Tokinosumika Sports Centre

=== Players who have played for both clubs ===
- (Japan) Shoma Kamata (A: 2020, F: 2021)
- (Japan) Hiroto Morooka (F: 2019–2022, A: 2023-2026)
- (Japan) Keita Saito (F: 2015, A: 2020-2023)
- (Japan) Hayate Take (F: 2018–2019, A: 2021-2023)
- (Japan) Yuji Wakasa (F: 2018–2019, A: 2020–2022)
- (Japan) Yu Yanagihara (A: 2006, F: 2008–2010, 2011–2013)

== Tohoku derby Akita vs Hachinohe ==
Tohoku derby Akita vs Hachinohe
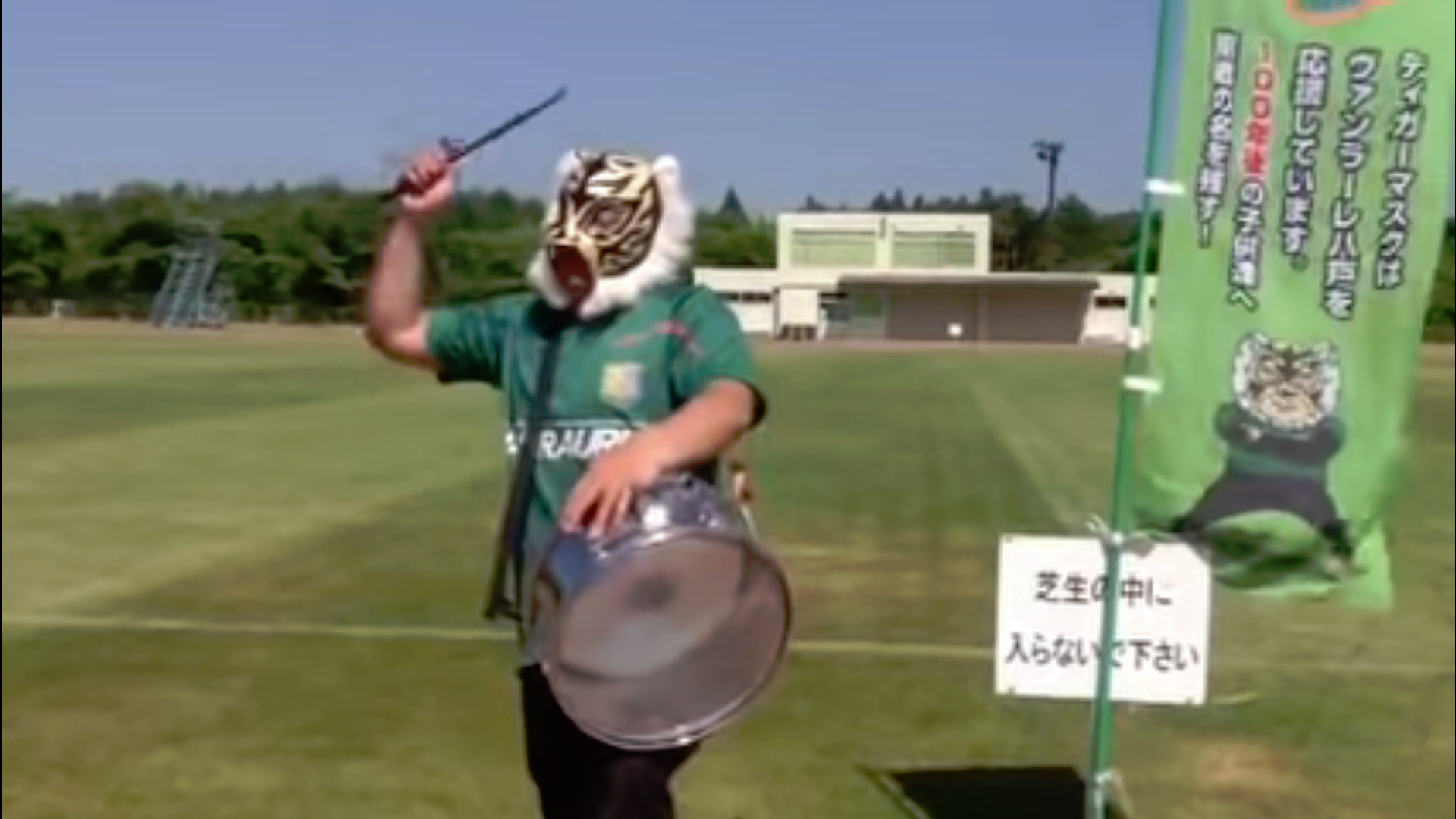
- Tiga mask, a head of a cheering group

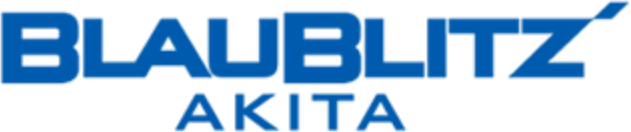
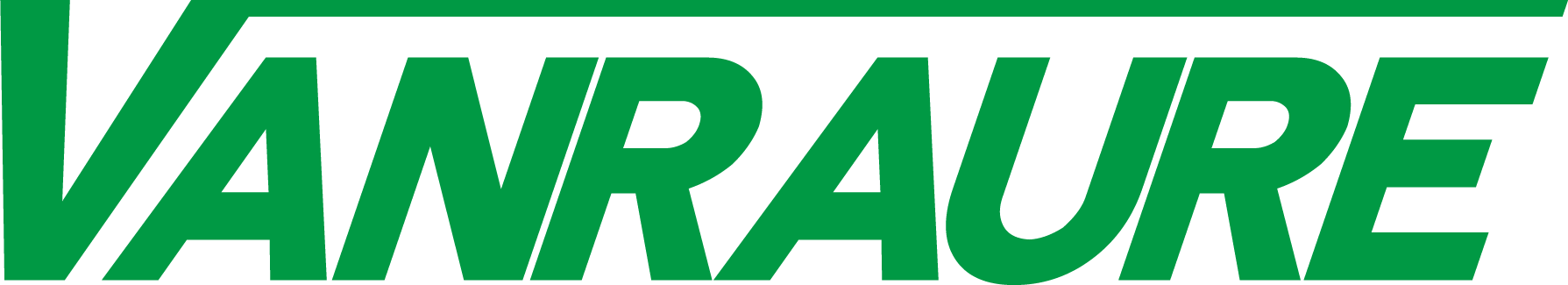
- Blaublitz Akita Vanraure Hachinohe
- Other names: Kita-Tohoku derby
- Location: (Japan) Akita Prefecture (Japan) Aomori Prefecture
- Teams: Blaublitz Akita; Vanraure Hachinohe
- First meeting: Blaublitz Akita 2-0 Vanraure Hachinohe (2016)
- Latest meeting: Hachinohe 1-0 Akita; J2League (29 August 2026)
- Next meeting: 29 April 2027
- Stadiums: Prifoods Stadium; Soyu Stadium

Statistics
- Total meetings: 8
- Most wins: Akita 5
- All-time series: Hachinohe: 3 Drawn: 0 Akita:5
- Largest victory: Hachinohe 0-2 Akita, 11 July 2020; Akita 2-0 Hachinohe, 27 August 2016

Home kit
Akita Home colours	Hachinohe Home colours

Football matches between Blaublitz Akita and Vanraure Hachinohe are described as the Tohoku derby Akita vs Hachinohe. It is a match between two cities located in Northern Tohoku region. This rivalry is also known as Kita-Tohoku derby.

=== Venues ===
The game is usually hosted at Soyu Stadium and Prifoods Stadium. The two stadiums are approximately 151 km (94 miles) apart.

	Stadium	Capacity	Image
Blaublitz Akita	Soyu Stadium	20,125	
Vanraure Hachinohe	Prifoods Stadium	5,200	

=== Past results ===
Statistics as of 12 May 2023

Tournament	GP	Akita wins	Draws	Hachinohe wins	Goal diff
J2 League	3	1	0	2	1 - 2
J3 League	4	3	0	1	6 - 3
Emperor's Cup	1	1	0	0	2 - 0
Total	8	5	0	3	9 - 5

==== J3 League ====
The derby was first played on 30 June 2019 when Hachinohe club was promoted to J3 League. Then in 2020 Akita club was promoted to J2 League.

Season	Date	(Stage/)Week		Venue	Home	Score	Away	Attendance
2019	30 June	J3	14	Daihatsu Stadium	Vanraure Hachinohe	1-2	Blaublitz Akita	1,833
2019	27 October	J3	28	Soyu Stadium	Blaublitz Akita	0-1	Vanraure Hachinohe	1,414
2020	11 July	J3	3	Prifoods Stadium	Vanraure Hachinohe	0-2	Blaublitz Akita	444
2020	31 October	J3	24	Soyu Stadium	Blaublitz Akita	2-1	Vanraure Hachinohe	1,081

==== J2 League ====
At the end of 2025, Vanraure Hachinohe was promoted to J2 League. Also, both teams participated at the J2/J3 100 Year Vision League in the same group: East A.

Season	Date	(Stage/)Week		Venue	Home	Score	Away	Attendance
2026	20 March	100 Year	7	Soyu Stadium	Blaublitz Akita	1-0	Vanraure Hachinohe	3,219
2026	26 April	100 Year	12	Prifoods Stadium	Vanraure Hachinohe	1-0	Blaublitz Akita	1,995
2026-27	29 August	J2	4	Prifoods Stadium	Vanraure Hachinohe	1-0	Blaublitz Akita	2,632
2026-27	29 April	J2	34	Soyu Stadium	Blaublitz Akita	vs	Vanraure Hachinohe	

==== Emperor's Cup ====
The derby was also played once in the Emperor's Cup.

Season	Date	(Stage/)Week	Venue	Home	Score	Away	Attendance
2016	27 August	1st rd	Akigin Stadium	Blaublitz Akita	2-0	Vanraure Hachinohe	603

==== Friendlies ====
They have competed more than 2 practice games together.

8 February 2015	Vanraure Hachinohe	0–0	Blaublitz Akita	Sendai, Miyagi
11:00		Report		Stadium: Adidas Sports Park

19 August 2018	Blaublitz Akita	3–1	Vanraure Hachinohe	Nikaho, Akita
		Report		Stadium: TDK Akita General Sports Center

=== Players who have played for both clubs ===
- (Japan) Mizuki Aiba (A: 2020–2021, H: 2023)
- (Japan) Shuhei Fukai (A: 2016–2018, H: 2020)
- (Japan) Keita Hidaka (A: 2016–2018, H: 2019)
- (Japan) Shintaro Kato (A: 2022, H: 2023-)
- (Japan) Daiki Koike (A: 2019–2020, H: 2022)
- (Japan) Masashi Kokubun (H: 2018–2020, 2022- A: 2021)
- (Japan) Naoyuki Yamada (A: 2013–2021, H: 2022)
