= Hokuto Bank =

The Hokuto Bank Ltd. 北都銀行

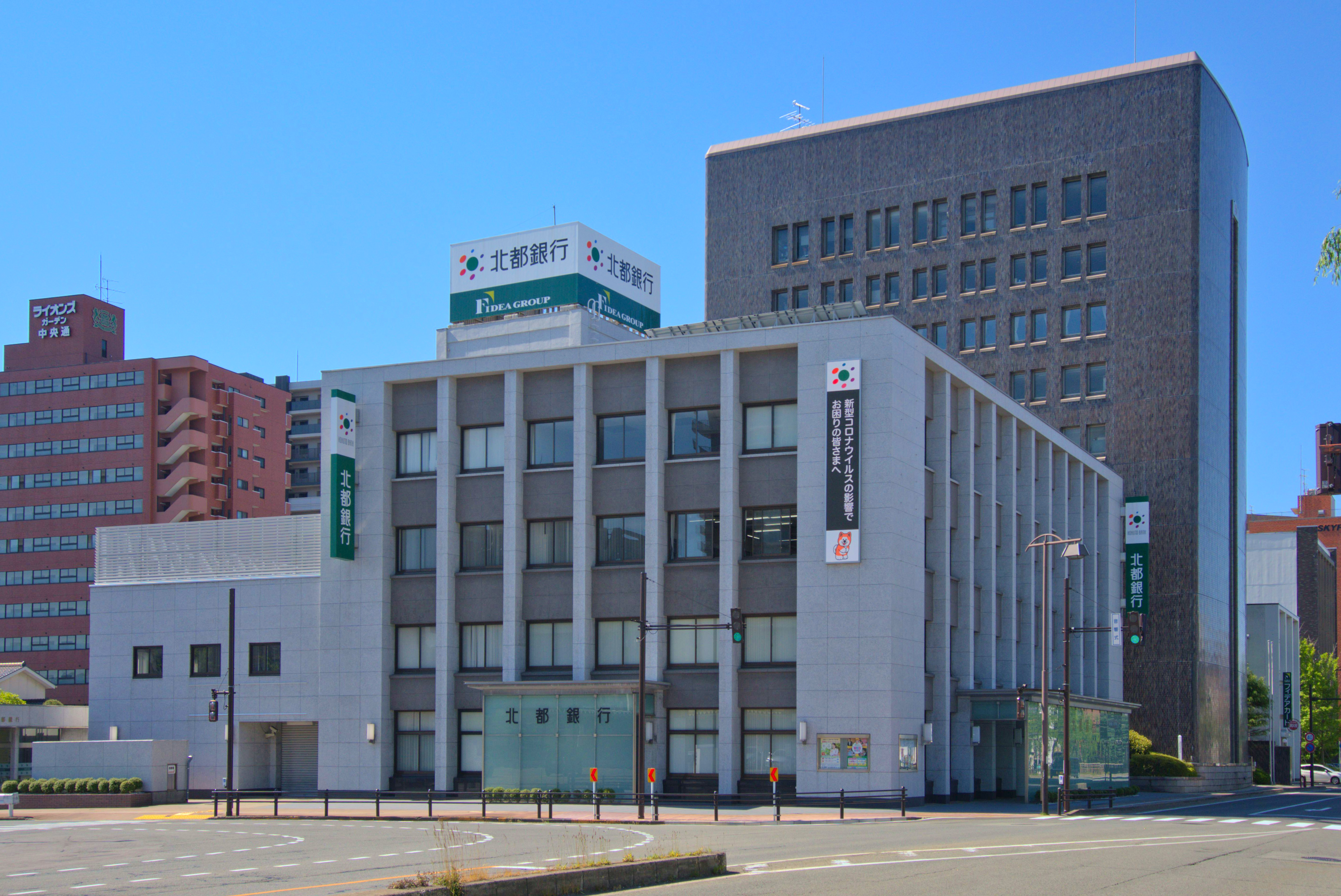
- Company type: Closed-stock company
- Industry: Banking financial services
- Predecessor: Masuda Bank (May 3, 1895)
- Founded: Yokote, Akita, Japan
- Headquarters: Akita, Japan (1993)
- Number of locations: 79 (plus 3 overseas)
- Area served: Tōhoku region, Japan
- Key people: Satoru Machida (Chairman), Eikichi Saito (President)
- Products: Retail Banking; Payday advance Mortgages; Consumer Finance; Investment Banking
- Revenue: ¥22,436 million (2023)
- Net income: ¥1,563 million (2023)
- Total assets: ¥37,879 million (2023)
- Number of employees: 548
- Website: hokutobank.co.jp

The Hokuto Bank (株式会社北都銀行, Kabushiki Kaisha Hokuto Ginkō) is a Japanese regional bank that is headquartered in Akita City, Akita Prefecture. The bulk of the bank's business is in Akita prefecture, although it does operate branches in regional cities such as Morioka and Sendai, as well as a branch in Tokyo. The bank's largest stakeholder is the Miyagi Prefecture-based Fidea Holdings, which controls 100 percent of the company stock.

== History ==
The forerunner to the Hokuto Bank was the Masuda Bank, established in Yokote, Akita Prefecture in 1895. Renamed Ugo Bank in 1922. In September 1928, it absorbed Odate Bank and Nikaho Bank. Although Ugo Bank merged with other banks throughout the first half of the 1900s (e.g. Ueda Bank), it changed its name to its present form in 1993 when it merged with the Akita Akebono Bank. At the time of the merger, the name Komachi Bank was floated as a possible name, but was ultimately turned down in favor of the current form.

The bank has gradually diversified its range of financial services, and began to offer insurance in 2002. In the early 2000s, the bank was involved numerous scandals, including embezzlement charges. This prompted the Japanese Financial Services Agency to request a plan to improve its governance. As a result, Hokuto Bank launched a series of initiatives, entitled Believe and, more recently, Breakthrough, to improve its governance.

In February 2024, Fidea Holdings announced that a committee had been set up to investigate the merger of the bank with Shonai Bank, another Fidea owned institution. In November, a merger scheduled for January 1, 2027 was announced, with Shonai continuing and Hokuto dissolving. The new Fidea Bank’s headquarters will be in the Shonai office in Yamagata.

== Soccer club ==
Hokuto Bank SC
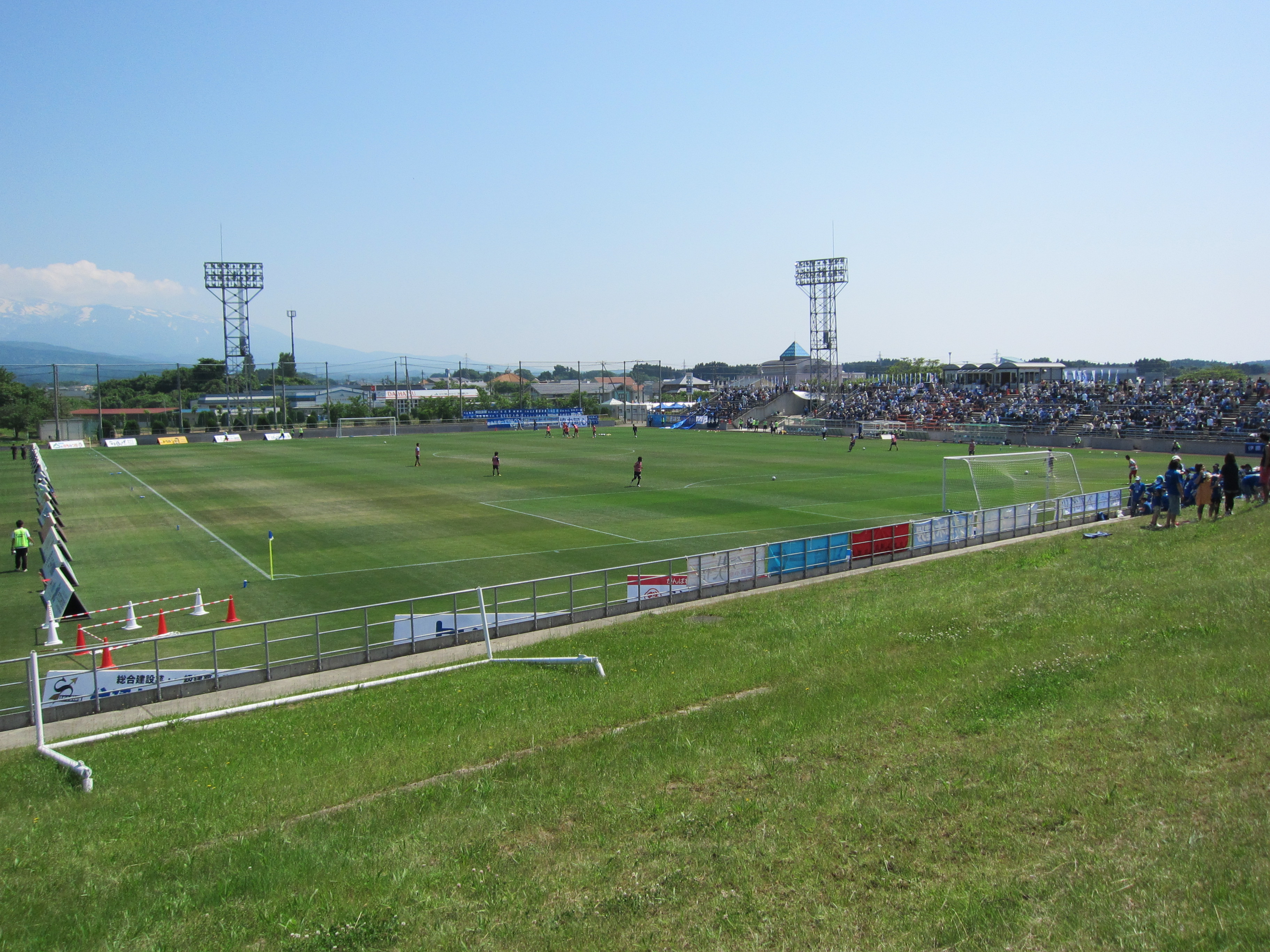
- Nikaho Green Field
- Ground: Nikaho Green Field; Akita Prefectural Central Park Playing Field; Space Project Field; Akita Prefecture Football Centre
- Capacity: 4,430; 16,500; 730
- Coordinates: 39°42′59″N 140°07′5″E
- Chairman: Motonori Ito
- Manager: Kakuo Oikawa
- League: Tohoku Soccer League D2N
Home colours	Away colours

Hokuto Bank Soccer Club (北都銀行サッカー部, Hokuto Ginko Sakka-bu) is a Japanese football club based in Akita Prefecture. They play in the Tohoku Soccer League and their team colour is yellow.

=== League record ===
Champions	Runners-up	Third place	Promoted	Relegated

Season	League	League Position	GP	W	D	L	F	A	GD	Pts	Emperor's Cup	Shakaijin Cup
1999	Akita Prefecture League	1st									-	-
2000	Tohoku D2N	1st	10	9	0	1	46	14	32	27	-	-
2001	Tohoku D2N	2nd	10	7	0	3	50	11	39	21	-	-
2002	Tohoku D2N	1st	10	7	1	2	37	10	27	22	-	-
2003	Tohoku D2N	3rd	10	6	0	4	27	21	6	18	-	-
2004	Tohoku D2N	2nd	10	6	0	4	30	23	7	18	-	-
2005	Tohoku D2N	5th	10	2	1	7	21	38	−17	7	-	-
2006	Tohoku D2N	6th	14	5	2	7	34	37	−3	17	-	-
2007	Tohoku D2N	8th	14	1	1	12	20	61	−41	4	-	-
2008	Akita Prefecture League	1st	9	8	0	1	41	9	32	24	-	-
2009	Akita Prefecture League	1st	10	9	1	0	42	7	35	28	-	-
2010	Akita Prefecture League	3rd	6	2	0	4	4	16	−12	6	-	-
2011	Akita Prefecture League	2nd	7	3	2	2	13	13	0	11	-	-
2012	Akita Prefecture League	2nd	3	2	0	1	24	5	19	6	-	-
2013	Akita Prefecture League	2nd	7	5	1	1	17	7	10	10	-	-
2014	Akita Prefecture League	1st	7	4	2	1	19	11	8	14	-	-
2015	Tohoku D2N	10th	18	1	1	16	17	97	−80	4	-	-
2016	Akita Prefecture League	1st	4	3	1	0	15	5	10	10	-	-
2017	Tohoku D2N	9th	18	3	2	13	23	62	−39	11	-	-
2018	Tohoku D2N	4th	18	9	1	8	39	48	−9	28	-	-
2019	Tohoku D2N	6th	18	8	2	8	43	39	4	26	-	-
2020	Tohoku D2N										-	-

=== Honours ===
- Tohoku Soccer League D2 North:
  - Champions (2): 2000, 2002
- Akita Prefecture League:
  - Champions (5): 1999, 2008, 2009, 2014, 2016
