= Kota Saito =

Japanese footballer

Personal information
- Full name: Kota Saito
- Date of birth: April 10, 1997 (age 29)
- Place of birth: Yamagata, Japan
- Height: 1.68 m (5 ft 6 in)
- Position: Midfielder

Youth career
- 2013–2015: Albirex Niigata

Senior career*
Years	Team	Apps	(Gls)
2015	Albirex Niigata	0	(0)
Total		0	(0)
- * Club domestic league appearances and goals

Kota Saito (斎藤 宏太, Saitō Kōta; born April 10, 1997) is a former Japanese football player.

== Career ==
Kota Saito promoted J1 League club Albirex Niigata from youth team in 2015. On September 9, he debuted in Emperor's Cup (v Blaublitz Akita) and got a goal.
