= Agustin Ortega =

Argentine footballer

Personal information
- Full name: Agustin Leonardo Ortega
- Date of birth: December 29, 1992 (age 33)
- Place of birth: Argentina
- Height: 1.80 m (5 ft 11 in)
- Position: Midfielder

Senior career*
Years	Team	Apps	(Gls)
2015	Blaublitz Akita	4	(0)
- * Club domestic league appearances and goals as of December 31, 2015

Agustin Ortega (born December 29, 1992) is an Argentine football player.

== Playing career ==
Agustin Ortega played for J3 League club; Blaublitz Akita in 2015 season.
