= Niigata Seiro Sports Center =

Sport facility in Seirō, Niigata, Japan

Coordinates: 37.986625°N 139.247868°E

- Albillage
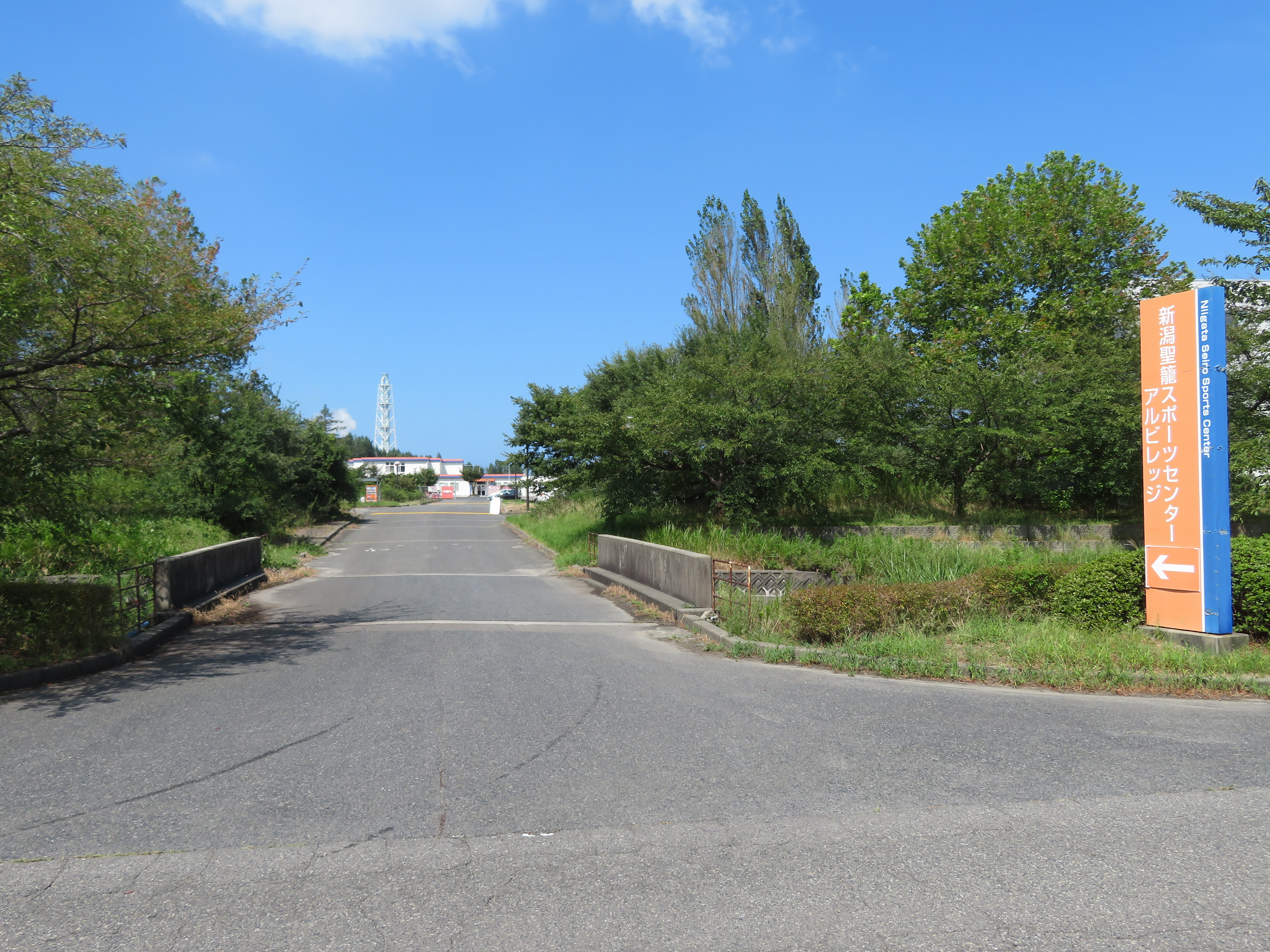
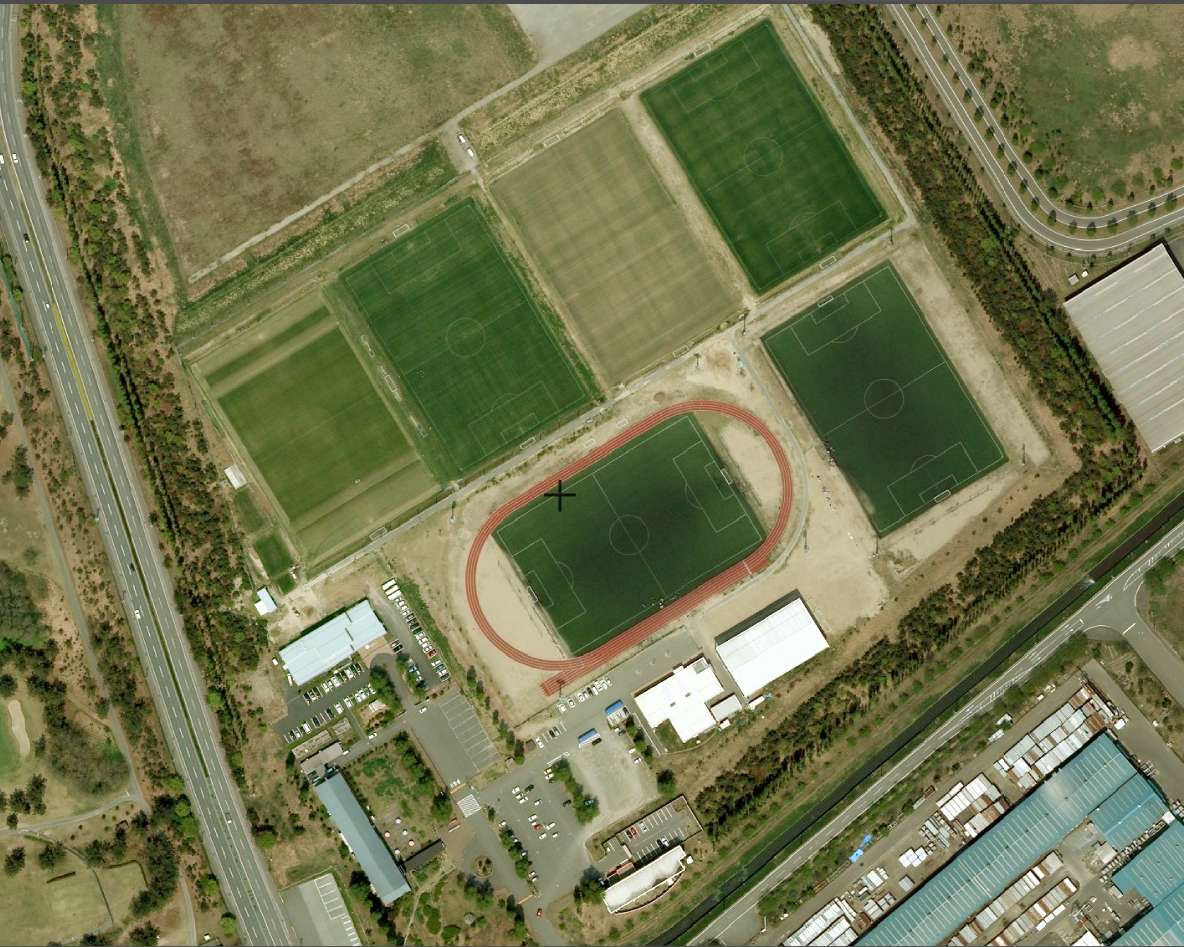

- Location within Niigata Prefecture Niigata Seiro Sports Center (Japan)
- Interactive map of Niigata Seiro Sports Center

Niigata Seiro Sports Center (新潟聖籠スポーツセンター) is a sport facility of the Seiro, Niigata. Alias Albillage.

== Outline ==
Integrated sports facilities that receive subsidy of "Sports environment maintenance model business that centers on soccer" of subsidy from Niigata Prefecture, Niigata City, and Seiro, Niigata and Albirex Niigata Ltd. and Football Association of Japan, and were constructed on Niigata east port industrial ground (site in Sapporo Breweies Niigata beer garden).

It is used as a practice place of professional soccer club Albirex Niigata.

== Facilities ==
=== Clubhouse ===
- Fitness gym
- Meeting room
- Locker room
- Shower booth

=== Soccer Ground ===
- pitch A - Natural turf Practice place only for Albirex Niigata
- pitch B - Natural turf
- pitch C - Natural turf
- pitch D - Natural turf
- pitch E - Astroturf. Lighting equipment. It is 400m track in the outside.
- pitch F - Astroturf. Lighting equipment.

=== Land track ===
- 400m track - Only four course straight line parts are six courses. It sets it up outside of pitch E.

=== Futsal place ===
- Futsal pitch with roof - Astroturf. Lighting equipment.

=== Others ===
- Restaurant - "Orange cafe"
- Convenience store - "Lawson Seiro Albillage store"
- Albirex Niigata clubhouse
- Dormitory of player of Albirex Niigata
