= Tatsuya Kumagai =

Japanese footballer

Personal information
- Full name: Tatsuya Kumagai
- Date of birth: 25 September 1992 (age 34)
- Place of birth: Tōgane, Japan
- Height: 1.67 m (5 ft 6 in)
- Position: Midfielder

Youth career
- 2002–2010: Kashiwa Reysol U-12/15/18
- 2011–2014: Sendai University

Senior career*
Years	Team	Apps	(Gls)
2015– 2016	Blaublitz Akita	55	(4)
- * Club domestic league appearances and goals as of 25 September 2021

Tatsuya Kumagai (熊谷達也, Kumagai Tatsuya; born 25 September 1992, in Tōgane) is a Japanese footballer who last played for Blaublitz Akita.

== Club statistics ==
Updated to 12 December 2022.

Club performance			League		Cup		Total	
Season	Club	League	Apps	Goals	Apps	Goals	Apps	Goals
Japan			League		Emperor's Cup		Total	
2015	Blaublitz Akita	J3 League	34	3	2	0	36	3
2016	Blaublitz Akita	J3 League	21	1	0	0	21	1
Career total			55	4	2	0	57	4
