= Hayato Mine =

Japanese footballer

Personal information
- Full name: Hayato Mine
- Date of birth: August 31, 1992 (age 34)
- Place of birth: Funabashi, Chiba, Japan
- Height: 1.84 m (6 ft 1/2 in)
- Position: Forward

Team information
- Current team: Briobecca Urayasu
- Number: 10

Youth career
- Funabashi FC
- –2010: Kashiwa Reysol

College career
Years	Team	Apps	(Gls)
2011–2013	Tokai University		

Senior career*
Years	Team	Apps	(Gls)
2014–2015	Blaublitz Akita	53	(6)
2016	Fujieda MYFC	18	(1)
2017–2020	Vonds Ichihara	29+	(6)
2021–	Briobecca Urayasu	40	(16)
- * Club domestic league appearances and goals as of 2 December 2022

Hayato Mine (峯 勇斗, Mine Hayato; born August 31, 1992) is a Japanese football player, who plays for Briobecca Urayasu as a forward.

== Career ==
He was part of Kashiwa Reysol's youth ranks and then he graduated at Tokai University. Finished the college, he decided to sign for Blaublitz Akita for the 1st season of J3 League. In January 2016, he switched to Fujieda MYFC.

== Club statistics ==
Updated to 23 February 2017.

Club performance			League		Cup		Total	
Season	Club	League	Apps	Goals	Apps	Goals	Apps	Goals
Japan			League		Emperor's Cup		Total	
2014	Blaublitz Akita	J3 League	24	4	1	0	25	4
2015	Blaublitz Akita	J3 League	29	2	2	0	31	2
2016	Fujieda MYFC	J3 League	18	1	1	0	19	1
Total			71	7	4	0	75	7
