= Shintaro Hirai =

Trinidad and Tobago-born Japanese footballer

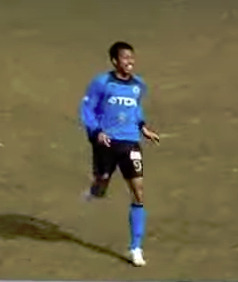

Personal information
- Full name: Shintaro Hirai
- Date of birth: January 7, 1984 (age 42)
- Place of birth: Port of Spain, Trinidad and Tobago
- Height: 1.80 m (5 ft 11 in)
- Position: Forward

Team information
- Current team: FC Casa

Youth career
- 2002–2005: Rissho University

Senior career*
Years	Team	Apps	(Gls)
2006–2012	Sagawa Printing	180	(49)
2013–2015	Blaublitz Akita	61	(4)
2016	Tochigi Uva FC	19	(3)
2017	FC Casa		
2018-	Utsunomiya FC		
2021	FC Casa		
- * Club domestic league appearances and goals as of 24 February 2021

Shintaro Hirai (平井 晋太郎, Hirai Shintaro; born January 7, 1984) is a Japanese former football player. He played for Tochigi Uva FC.

== Playing career ==
Shintaro Hirai played for Sagawa Printing from 2006 to 2012. In 2013, he moved to Blaublitz Akita. In 2016, he moved to Tochigi Uva FC.

== Club statistics ==
Updated to 20 November 2016.

Club performance			League		Cup		Total	
Season	Club	League	Apps	Goals	Apps	Goals	Apps	Goals
Japan			League		Emperor's Cup		Total	
2006	Sagawa Printing	JFL	12	3	0	0	12	3
2007	Sagawa Printing	JFL	27	5	1	0	28	5
2008	Sagawa Printing	JFL	23	5	2	1	25	6
2009	Sagawa Printing	JFL	31	7	2	0	33	7
2010	Sagawa Printing	JFL	32	11	1	0	33	11
2011	Sagawa Printing	JFL	28	6	2	1	30	7
2012	Sagawa Printing	JFL	27	12	0	0	27	12
2013	Blaublitz Akita	JFL	28	2	2	0	30	2
2014	Blaublitz Akita	J3 League	12	0	0	0	12	0
2015	Blaublitz Akita	J3 League	21	2	1	1	22	3
2016	Tochigi Uva FC	JFL	19	3	1	0	20	3
Total			260	56	12	3	272	59
