= Akita Sports Plus ASP Stadium =

Football stadium in Akita Prefecture, Japan

- 秋田スポーツPLUS・ASPスタジアム
- ASP
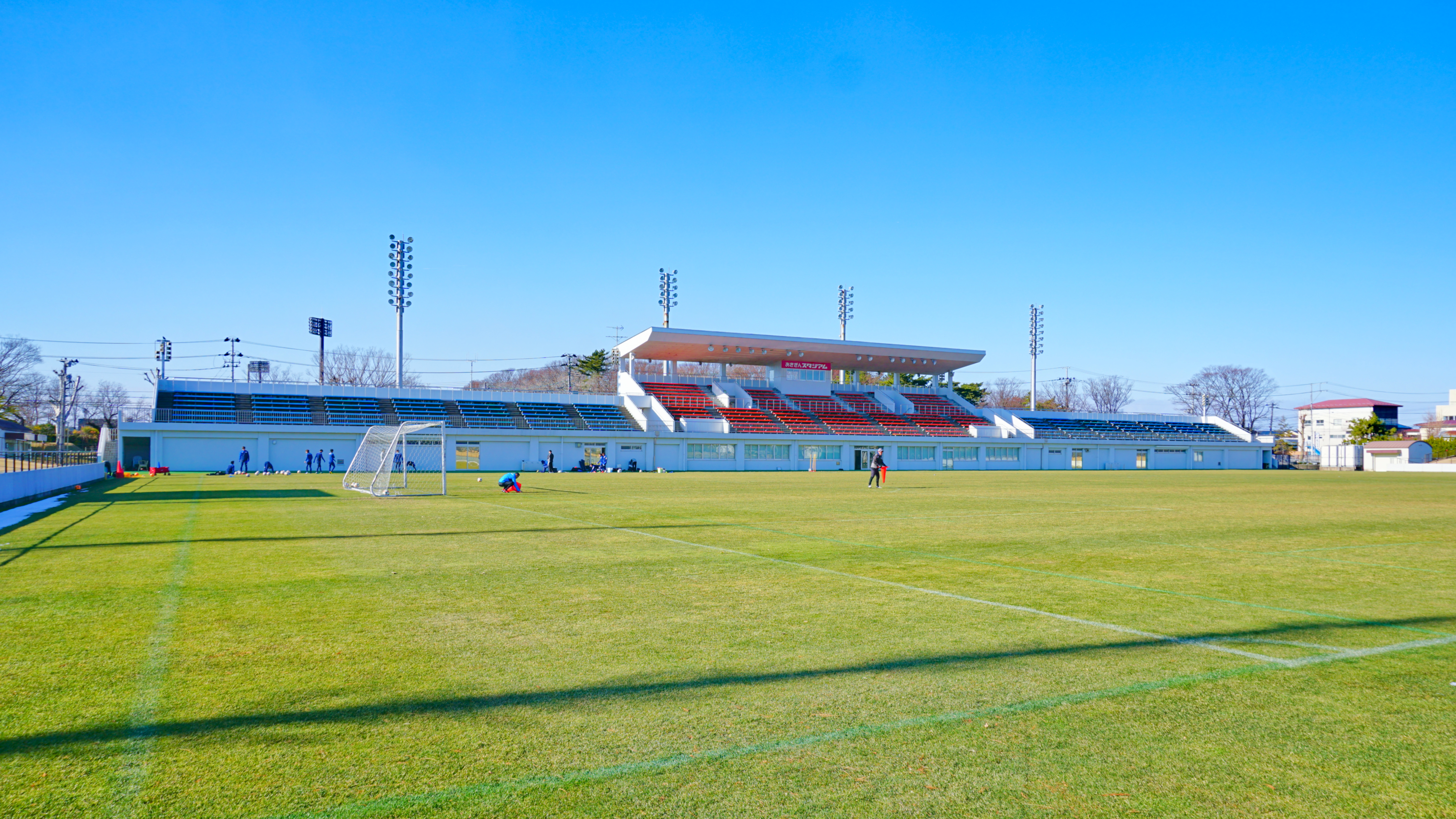
- Main stand of ASP Stadium
- Interactive map of Akita Sports Plus ASP Stadium
- Full name: 秋田市八橋運動公園球技場
- Former names: Akita Yabase Playing Field (1953–2014); Akigin Stadium (2014-2023)
- Address: 1–1 Yabase Undō Kōen, Akita, Japan
- Coordinates: 39°43′17.58″N 140°5′57.4″E
- Operator: Sports Promotion Department, Akita City Board of Education
- Capacity: 4,992
- Type: Stadium
- Surface: Grass
- Scoreboard: Electronic
- Field size: 130 × 80 m
- Field shape: Rectangular

Construction
- Opened: August 1953
- Renovated: July 2004
- Expanded: March 2002

Tenants
- Blaublitz Akita (J. League) (2013–2018); Akita Northern Bullets; Saruta Kōgyō S.C. [tl] Akita FC Cambiare; Hokuto Bank SC; Akita University Medical FC

Website
- City of Akita webpage

Akita Sports Plus ASP Stadium (秋田スポーツPLUS ASPスタジアム, Akita Supo-tsu Purasu ASP sutajiamu) for their sponsor the Akita Sports Plus, is a football stadium in Akita, Akita Prefecture, Japan. The stadium has a capacity of 4,992 and has been the home ground of J3 League club Blaublitz Akita since 2013. It was formerly known as Akita Yabase Playing Field. Since September 2014 it had been called Akigin Stadium for the naming rights by Akita Bank.

== History ==
The stadium was first opened in August 1953 and a roof was constructed over the main stand in September 1961. Lighting was installed in July 1978 and upgraded in September 2001. Underdrainage was installed in June 1982. The ground was converted to natural grass in November 2001. In March 2002 the end stand was renovated and a new stand opposite the main stand was constructed. Renovation of the main stand was completed in July 2004, increasing the capacity to 4,992 (including 15 wheelchair spaces). In 2007 the stadium hosted the men's soccer event of the National Sports Festival of Japan.

== Facilities ==
The stadium is equipped with lighting for night matches, an electronic scoreboard and broadcast booth. The main stand also houses conference rooms. The main stand has seating for 1,882 people, including 10 wheelchair spaces. The end and side stands are grassed terraces that have a capacity of 1,300 and 1,800 respectively.

A second field known as the No.2 Field was built next to the stadium in October 2005. It has a synthetic turf surface and a capacity of 730 people. It is currently known as the Space Project Dream Field under a 2014 naming rights deal.

== Tenants ==
J3 League club Blaublitz Akita has been the main tenant since 2013. The Akita Northern Bullets of the second-tier Top East League are also based at the ground. The stadium also hosts high school and amateur soccer and rugby tournaments each year. The ground is available for use from April until November each year. The conference rooms are available for hire all year round.

== Naming rights ==
In August 2014 the City of Akita leased the naming rights to the stadium to Akita Bank for a period of two years and seven months, from September 2014 until March 2017. The agreement was reported as being worth 3.25 million yen per year. In a separate deal announced at the same time, the naming rights of the No.2 Field was leased to the events company "Space Project" for the same time period at 720,000 yen per year.

In February 2023 the City and NPO corporation Akita Sports Plus have signed a 3-year, JPY3.3 million stadium naming-rights deal.

== Access ==
The stadium is accessible via buses operated by the Akita Chuoukotsu Bus company. There is also a car park with 180 bays, including three reserved for wheelchair users.

== Gallery ==
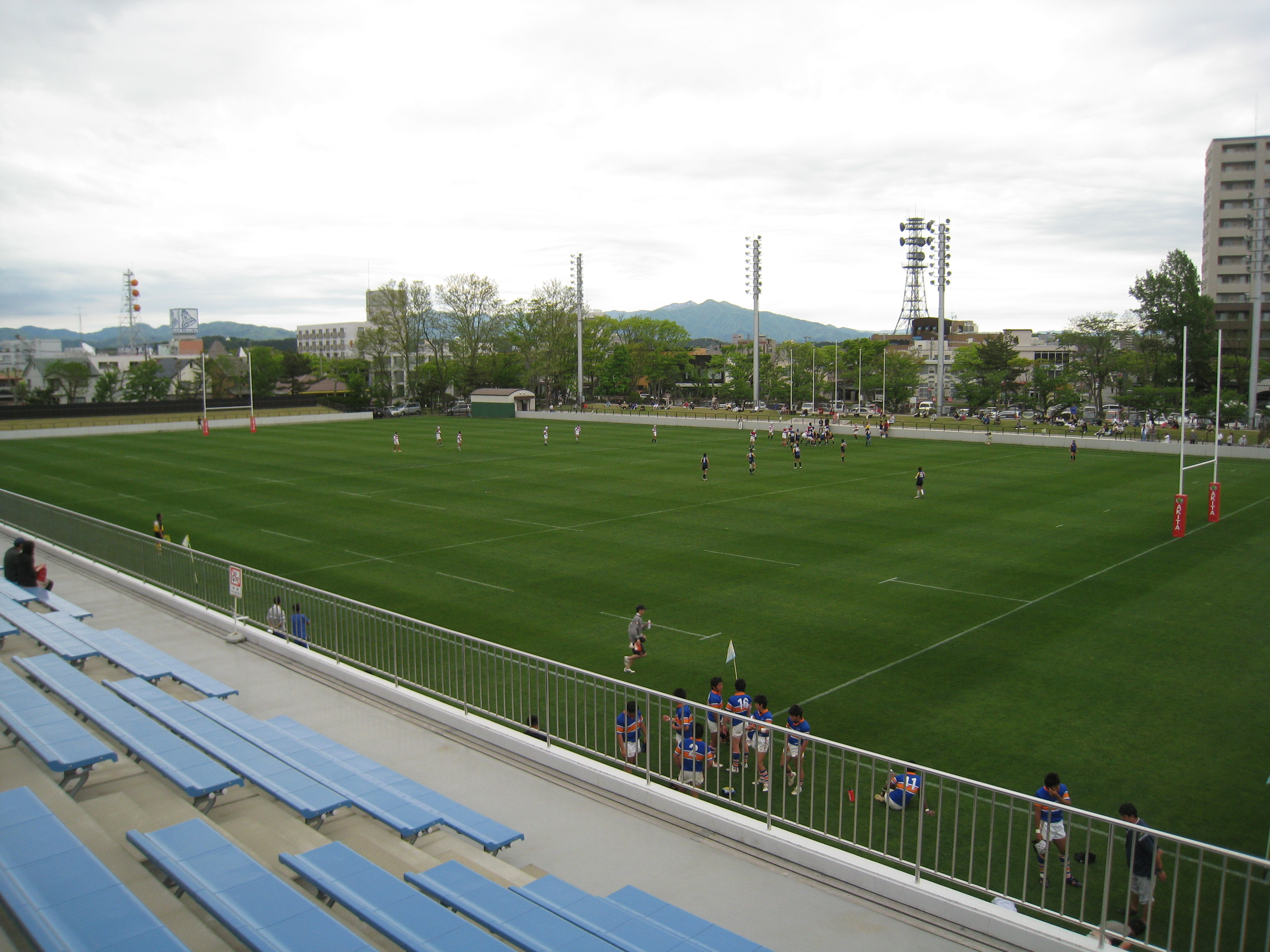
View from the main stand

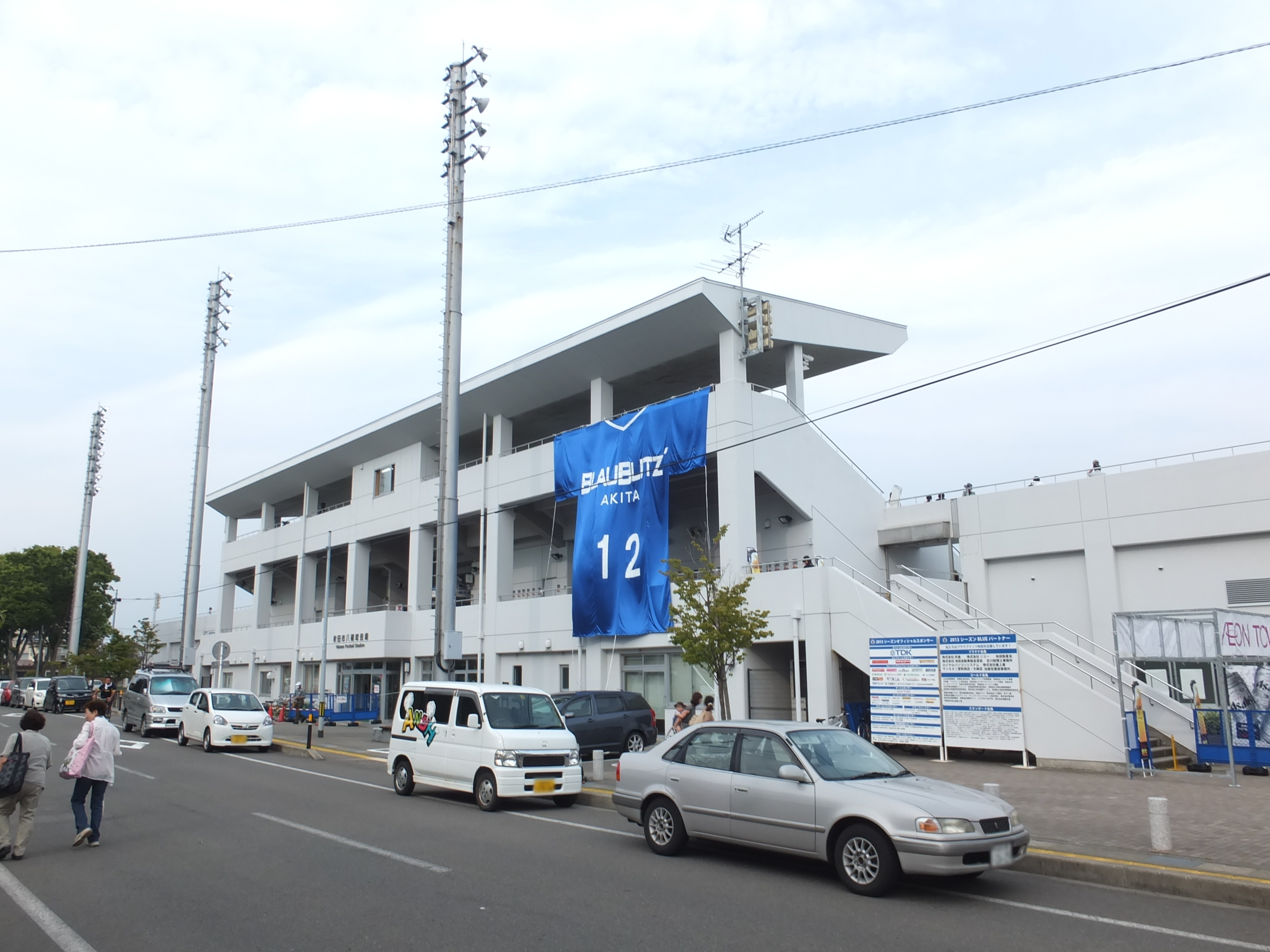
Entrance to the main stand

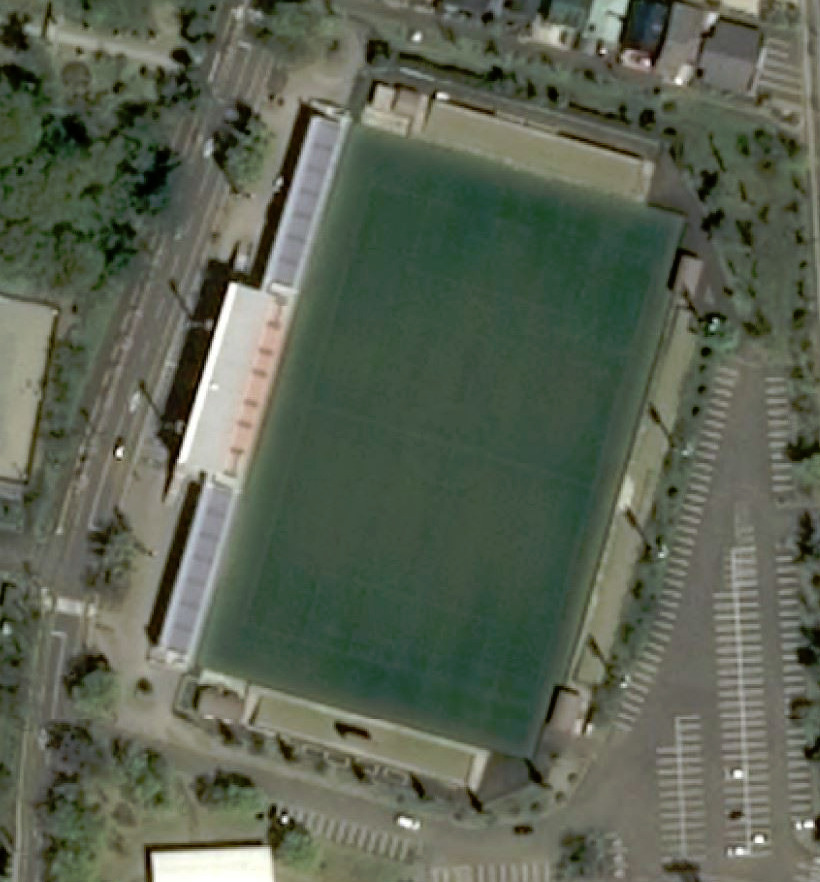
Satellite view

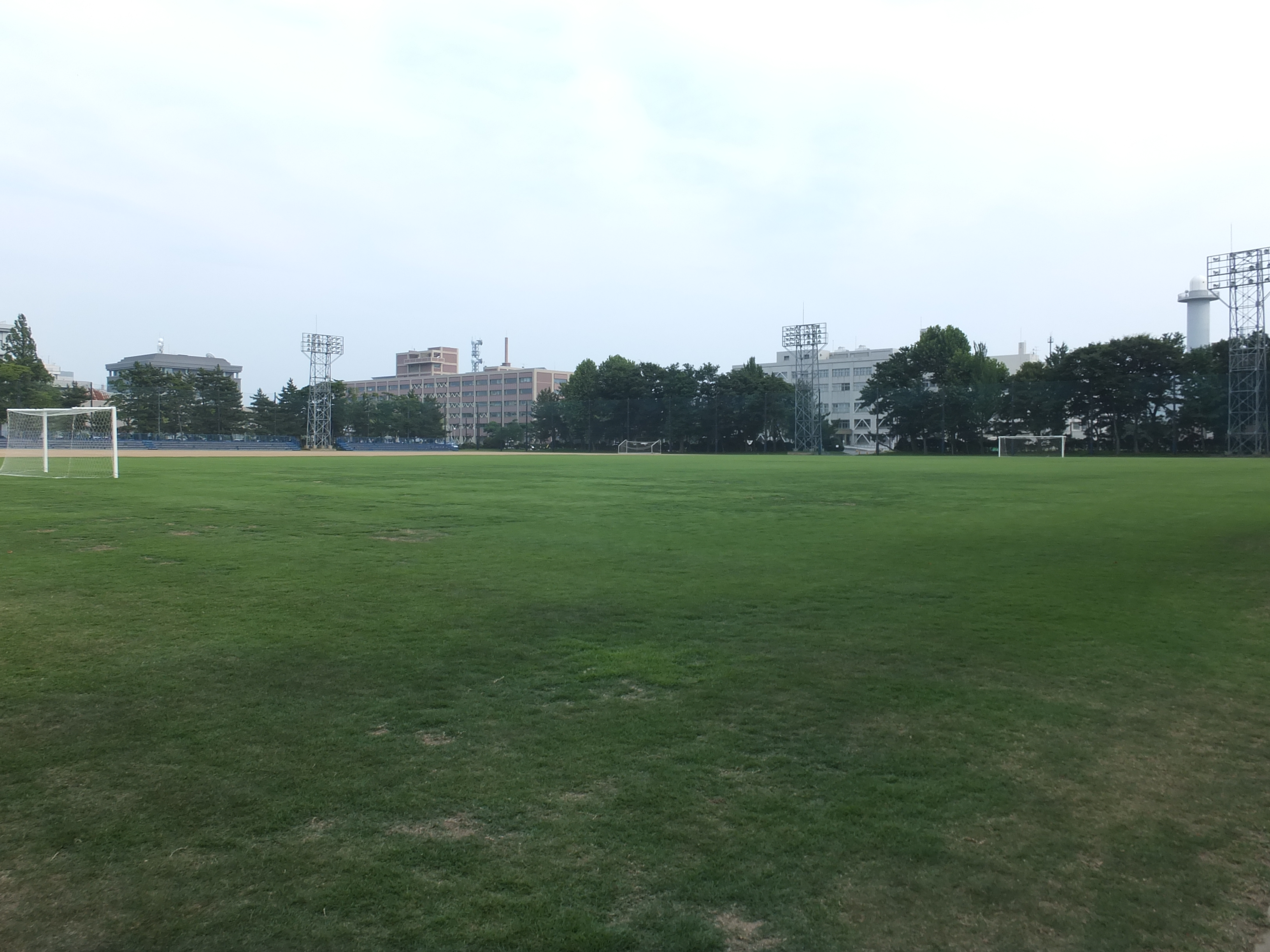
Space Project Dream Field and Health Square

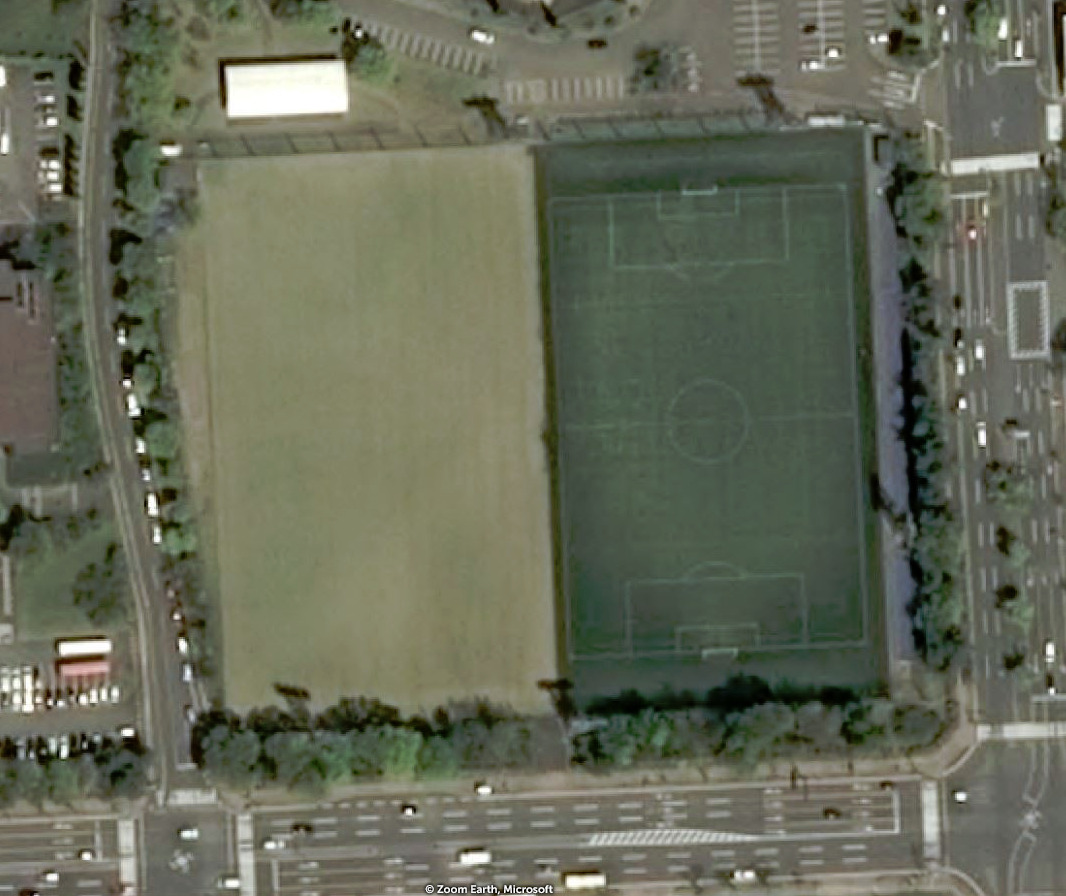
Space Project Dream Field (right) and Health Square

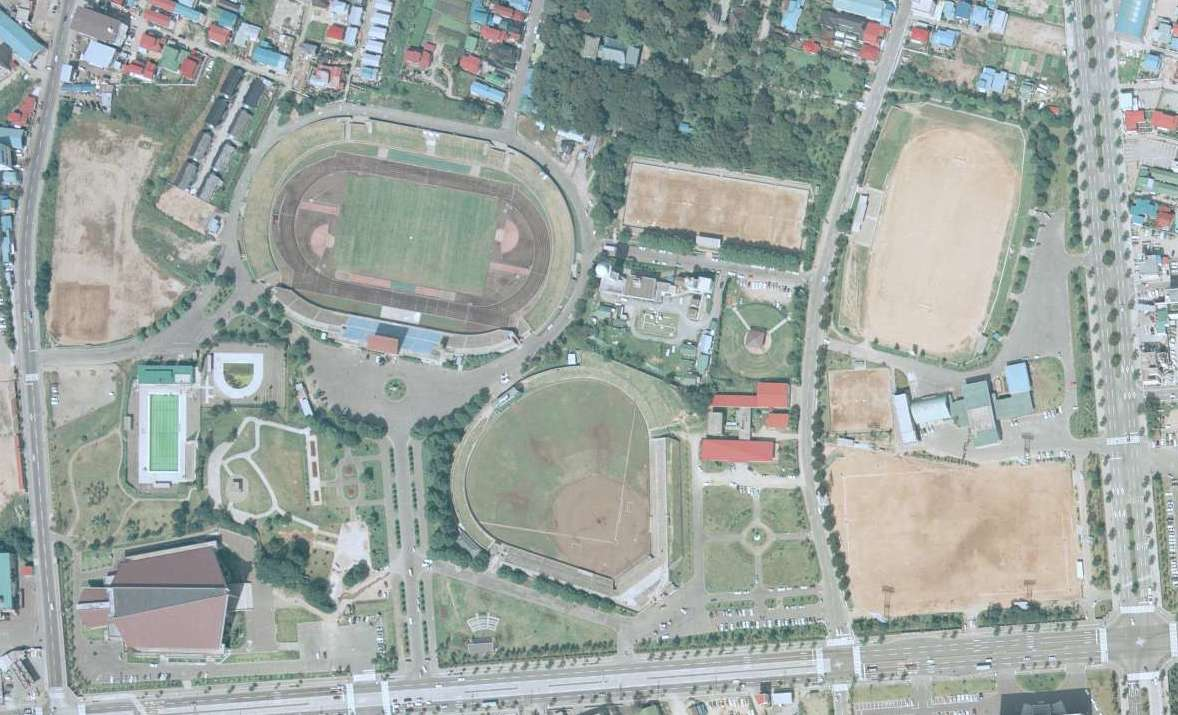
Yabase Sports Park in 1975

Former logo
