= Nikaho Green Field =

Football stadium in Nikaho, Akita, Japan

- 仁賀保グリーンフィールド
- Nikasuta
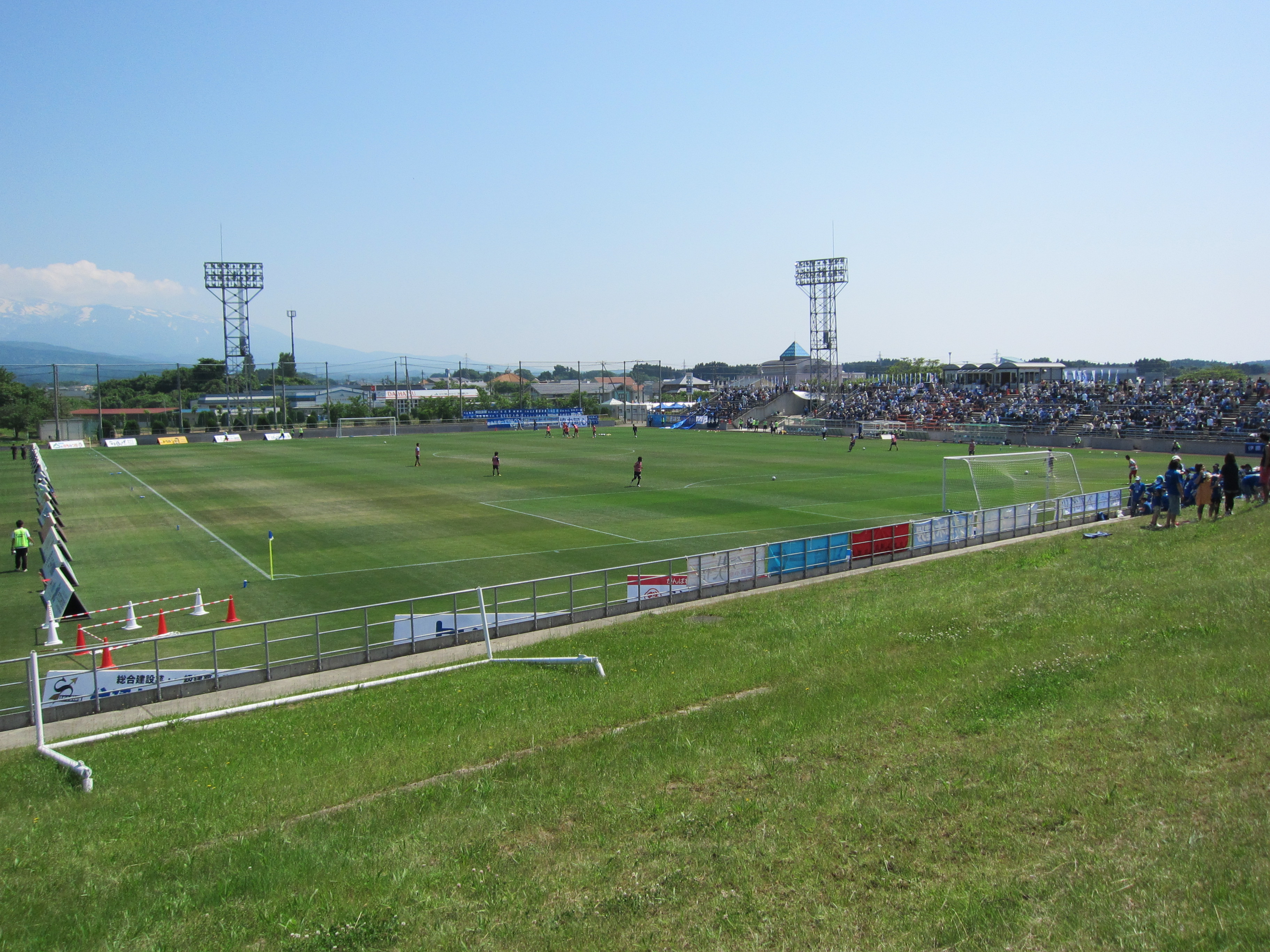

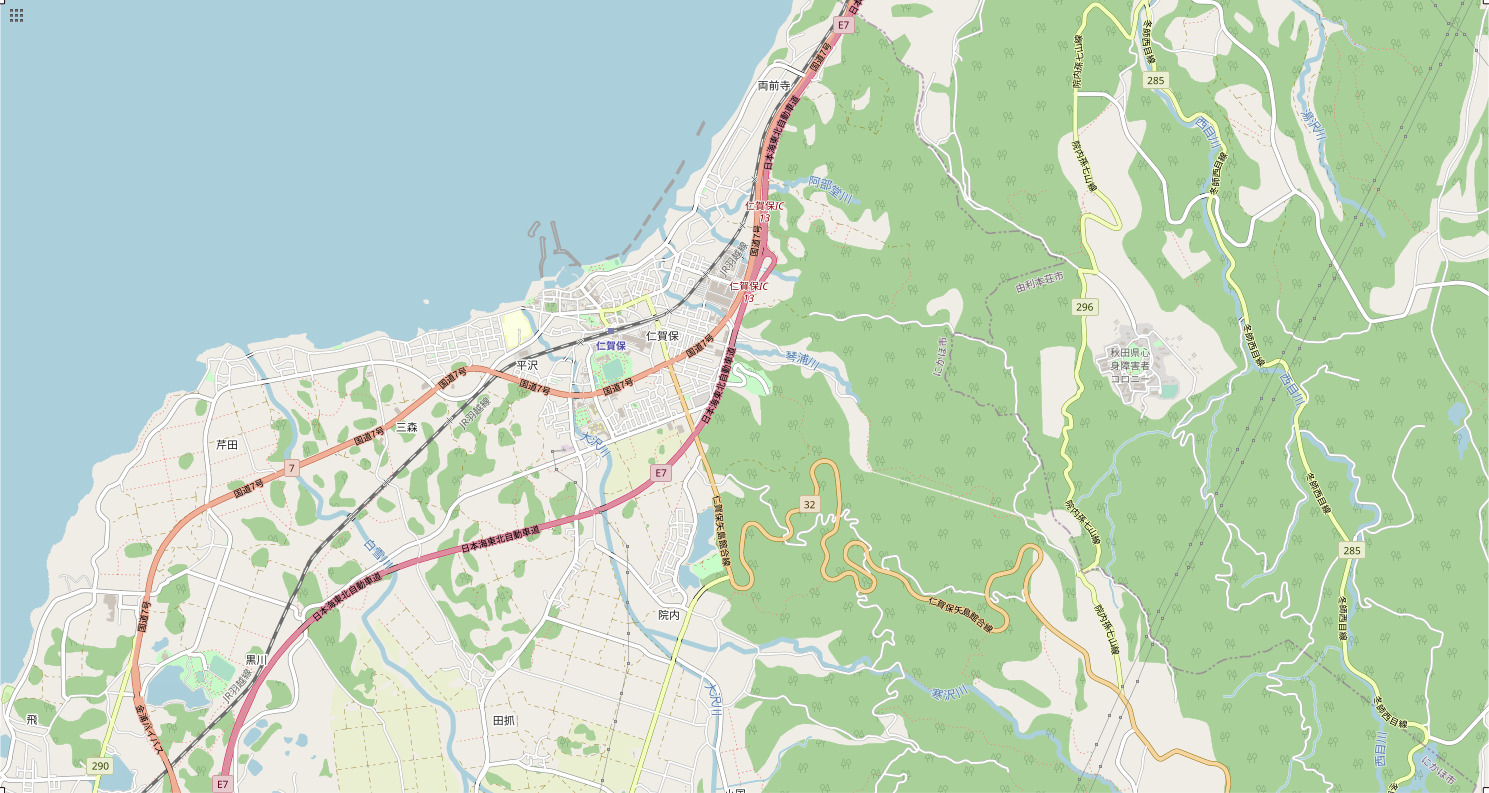
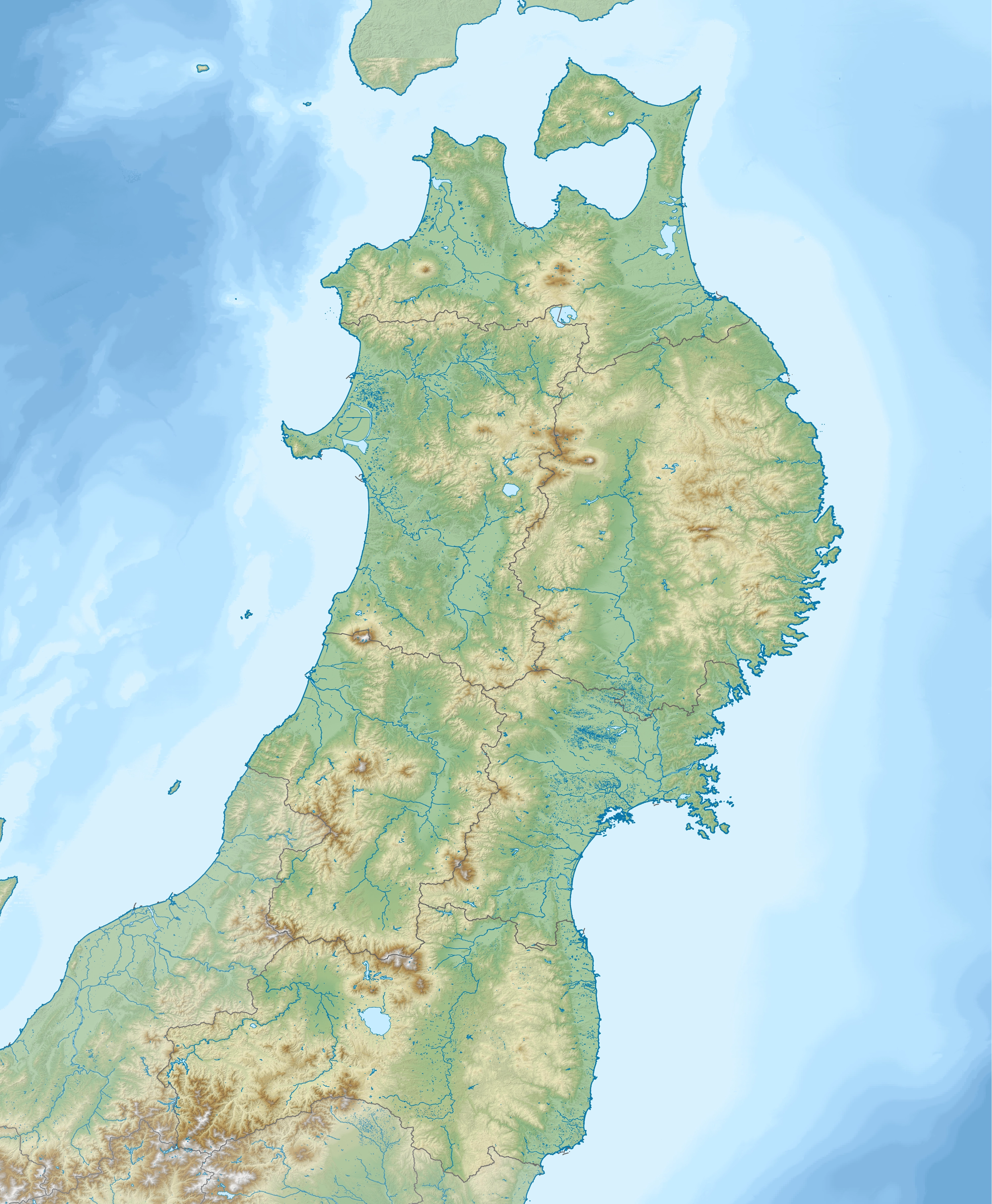
- Location of Nikaho Green Field within Nikaho, Akita Nikaho Green Field (Akita Prefecture) Nikaho Green Field (Tohoku Region) Nikaho Green Field (Japan)
- Interactive map of Nikaho Green Field
- Former names: Nikaho Sports Park Multi-purpose Square; Murasugiso Ground
- Address: Hirasawa, Nikaho, Akita, Japan
- Coordinates: 39°17′14.0″N 139°57′49.73″E
- Operator: Nikaho city
- Capacity: 4,430
- Type: Stadium
- Surface: Grass
- Field size: 111 × 118 m
- Field shape: Rectangular
- Parking: 256 spaces

Construction
- Renovated: 2005

Tenants
- Blaublitz Akita (J. League) (-2013); TDK Shinwakai; Hokuto Bank SC

Nikaho Green Field (仁賀保グリーンフィールド, Nikaho Gurin Firudo) is a football stadium in Nikaho, Akita Prefecture, Japan. The stadium has a capacity of 4,430 and was the home ground of J3 League club Blaublitz Akita.

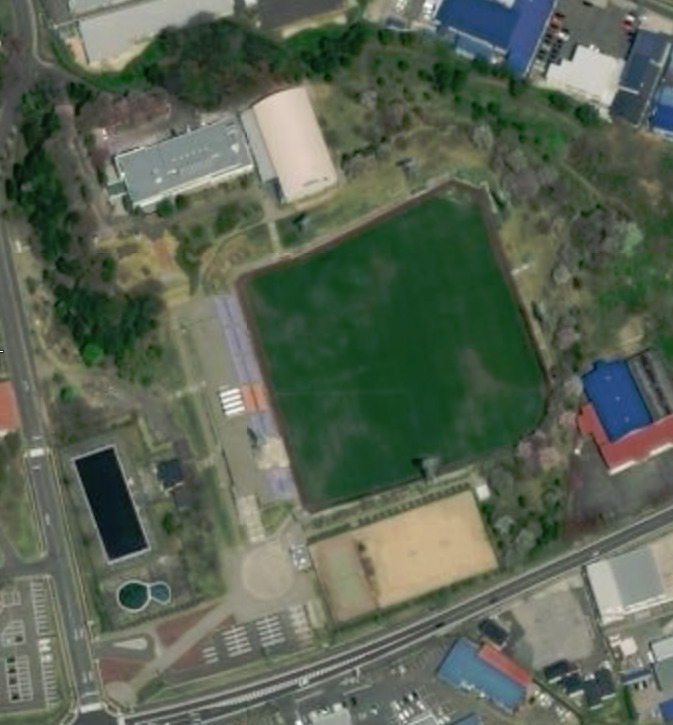
Satellite view
