= Keita Makiuchi =

Japanese footballer

Personal information
- Full name: Keita Makiuchi
- Date of birth: July 24, 1990 (age 36)
- Place of birth: Kagoshima, Japan
- Height: 1.72 m (5 ft 7 1/2 in)
- Position: Midfielder

Youth career
- 2009–2012: Senshu University

Senior career*
Years	Team	Apps	(Gls)
2013–2015	Blaublitz Akita	70	(2)
2016	SC Sagamihara	22	(0)
- * Club domestic league appearances and goals as of 23 November 2021

Keita Makiuchi (牧内 慶太, Makiuchi Keita; born July 24, 1990 in Kagoshima) is a Japanese football player for SC Sagamihara.

== Club statistics ==
Updated to 23 February 2016.

Club performance			League		Cup		Total	
Season	Club	League	Apps	Goals	Apps	Goals	Apps	Goals
Japan			League		Emperor's Cup		Total	
2013	Blaublitz Akita	JFL	25	1	1	0	26	1
2014	Blaublitz Akita	J3 League	11	0	1	0	12	0
2015	Blaublitz Akita	J3 League	34	1	2	1	36	2
Career total			70	2	4	1	74	3
