= TDK Shinwakai =

Japanese football club

Coordinates: 39°16′3.9″N 139°55′41.9″E

TDK Shinwakai SC TDK親和会
- Full name: TDK Shinwakai Soccer Club
- Founded: 1987; 39 years ago
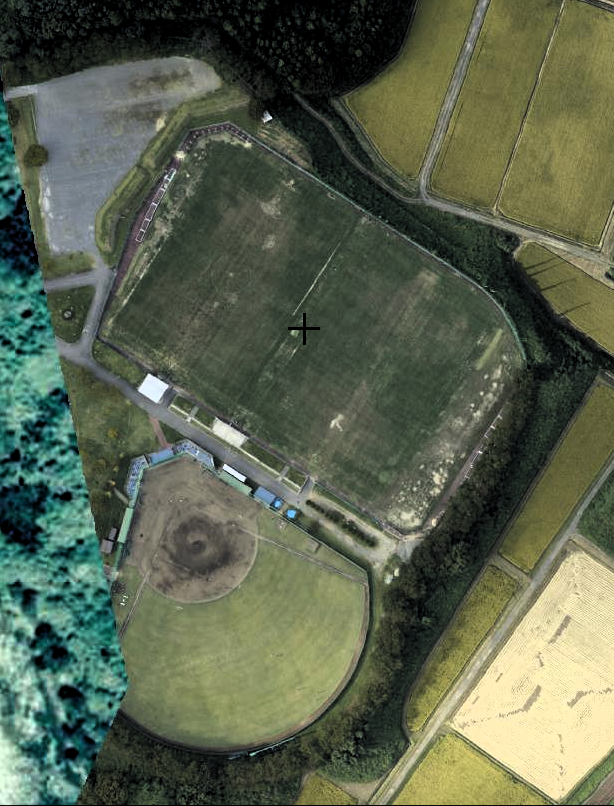
- Ground: TDK General Sports Centre
- Chairman: Kazuaki Sasaki
- Manager: Kazuaki Sasaki
- League: Tohoku Soccer League D2 North
- 2020: –
Home colours	Away colours

TDK Shinwakai Soccer Club (TDK親和会サッカー部, TDK Shinwakai Sakkabu) is a Japanese football club based in Nikaho, Akita, the southern city of Akita Prefecture. They play in the Tohoku Soccer League. Their team colour is blue.

== League record ==
Champions	Runners-up	Third place	Promoted	Relegated

Season	League	Pos.	G	W	D	L	F	A	GD	Pts	Emperor's Cup	Shakaijin Cup
2003	Akita Prefecture 1	6th	9						2	11	-	-
2004	Akita Prefecture 1	2nd	9						4	21	-	-
2005	Akita Prefecture 1	1st	10						33	25	-	-
2006	Tohoku D2N	8th	14	1	2	11	16	57	−41	5	-	-
2007	Akita Prefecture 1	1st	9						37	22	-	-
2008	Akita Prefecture 1	4th	9	4	2	3	21	18	3	14	-	-
2009	Akita Prefecture 1	2nd	10	7	1	2	35	14	21	22	-	-
2010	Akita Prefecture 1	1st	6	5	1	0	21	3	18	16	-	-
2011	Tohoku D2	7th	14	2	3	9	25	36	−11	9	-	-
2012	Tohoku D2N	2nd	3	2	0	1	24	5	19	6	-	-
2013	Tohoku D2N	4th	18	7	3	8	23	22	1	24	-	-
2014	Tohoku D2N	3rd	18	11	3	4	36	25	11	36	-	-
2015	Tohoku D2N	4th	18	9	7	2	41	21	20	34	-	-
2016	Tohoku D2N	6th	18	6	2	10	34	35	−1	20	-	-
2017	Tohoku D2N	5th	18	9	3	6	36	39	−3	30	-	-
2018	Tohoku D2N	6th	18	6	3	9	36	35	1	21	-	-
2019	Tohoku D2N	2nd	18	9	4	5	41	24	17	14	-	-
2020	Tohoku D2N	Declined participation due to the influence of the new coronavirus										
2021	Tohoku D2N	Canceled due to the influence of the new coronavirus										
2022	Tohoku D2N	3rd	8	5	1	2	27	11	16	16	-	
2023	Tohoku D2N									-	-	

Key

- Pos. = Position in league; G = Games played; W = Games won; D = Games drawn; L = Games lost; F = Goals for; A = Goal against; GD = Goal difference; Pts = Points gained

== Honours ==
- Akita Prefecture League:(3)
  - Champions: 2005, 2007, 2010

== Current squad ==
As of 23 September 2022

Note: Flags indicate national team as defined under FIFA eligibility rules; some limited exceptions apply. Players may hold more than one non-FIFA nationality.

No.	Pos.	Nation	Player
1	GK	JPN	Rui Sato
2	DF	JPN	Takumi Takahashi
3	DF	JPN	Shunichi Sasaki
4	DF	JPN	Shota Kawai
5	DF	JPN	Takato Miura
6	MF	JPN	Shun Yamamoto
7	MF	JPN	Yosuke Konno
8	MF	JPN	Shinta Morikawa
9	MF	JPN	Naoya Imai
10	MF	JPN	Wataru Kumagai
11	MF	JPN	Kyohei Maeyama
12	GK	JPN	Daigo Sato
13	DF	JPN	Kai Ota
14	MF	JPN	Yusuke Nakagawa
15	MF	JPN	Dai Ito

No.	Pos.	Nation	Player
16	MF	JPN	Kenneth Mizuguchi
17	FW	JPN	Taro Sugahara
18	DF	JPN	Takashi Chiba
21	GK	JPN	Yoshiyuki Sato
22	DF	JPN	Tomu Watanabe
23	MF	JPN	Sota Saito
24	MF	JPN	Shuhei Kamadai
26	DF	JPN	Konosuke Kumagai
27	MF	JPN	Ryo Takahashi
28	FW	JPN	Hideyuki Hasebe
29	FW	JPN	Nozumu Oyamada
30	FW	JPN	Shota Toyoshima
31	MF	JPN	Rauto Abe
32	GK	JPN	Tomoyuki Kaneko
33	MF	JPN	Torai Kamada

== Notable players ==
TDK logo

- Jun Kaga
- Kyohei Maeyama
- Shunsuke Miura
- Takuya Narita
- Toshihito Ono
- Moriyasu Saito
- Kazuki Sato
- Yoshiyuki Sato
- Taro Sugahara
- Kazuhiro Suzuki
- Takanori Takahashi
- Go Togashi
- Torai Kamata

== Gallery ==
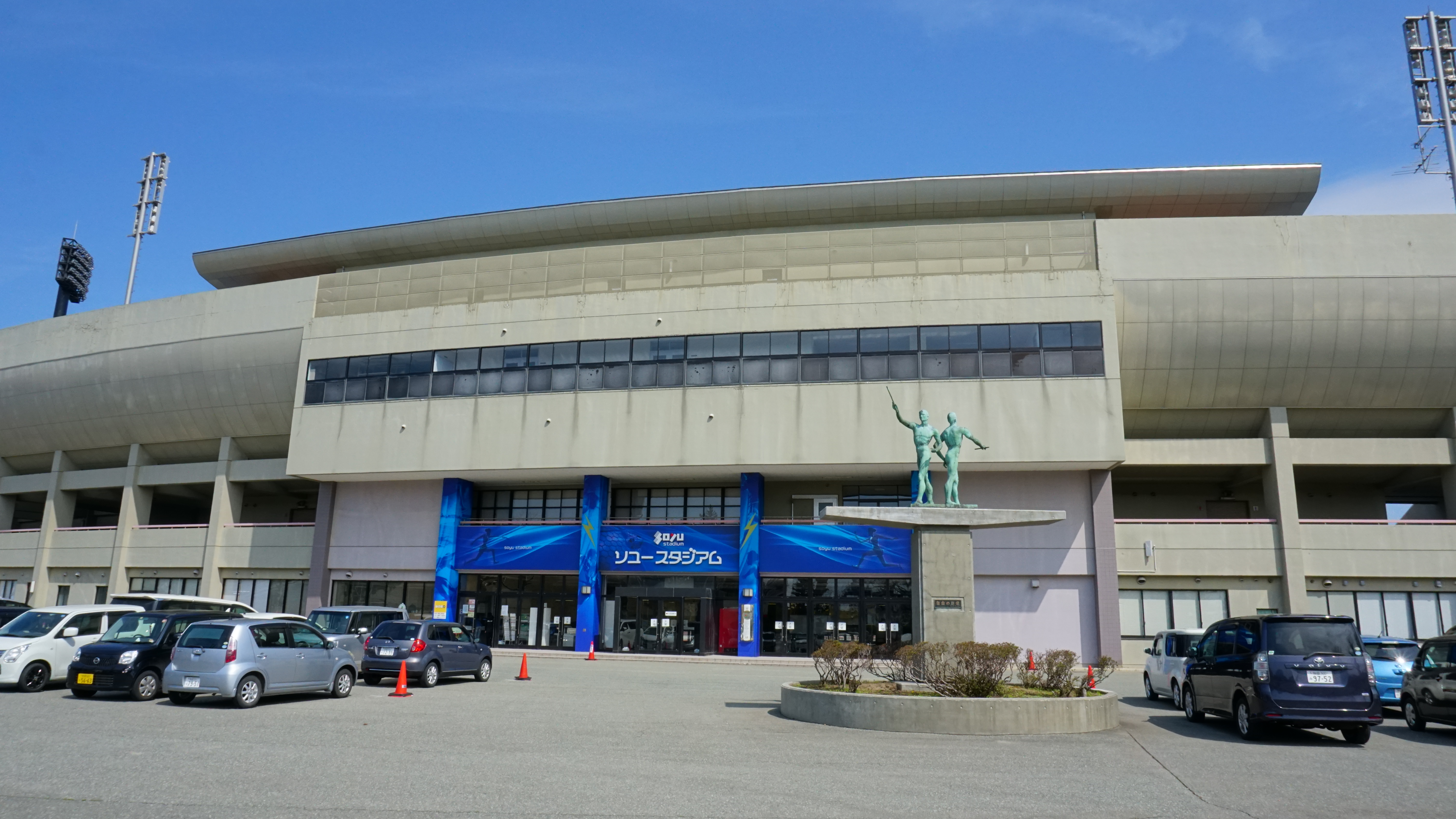
Soyu Stadium

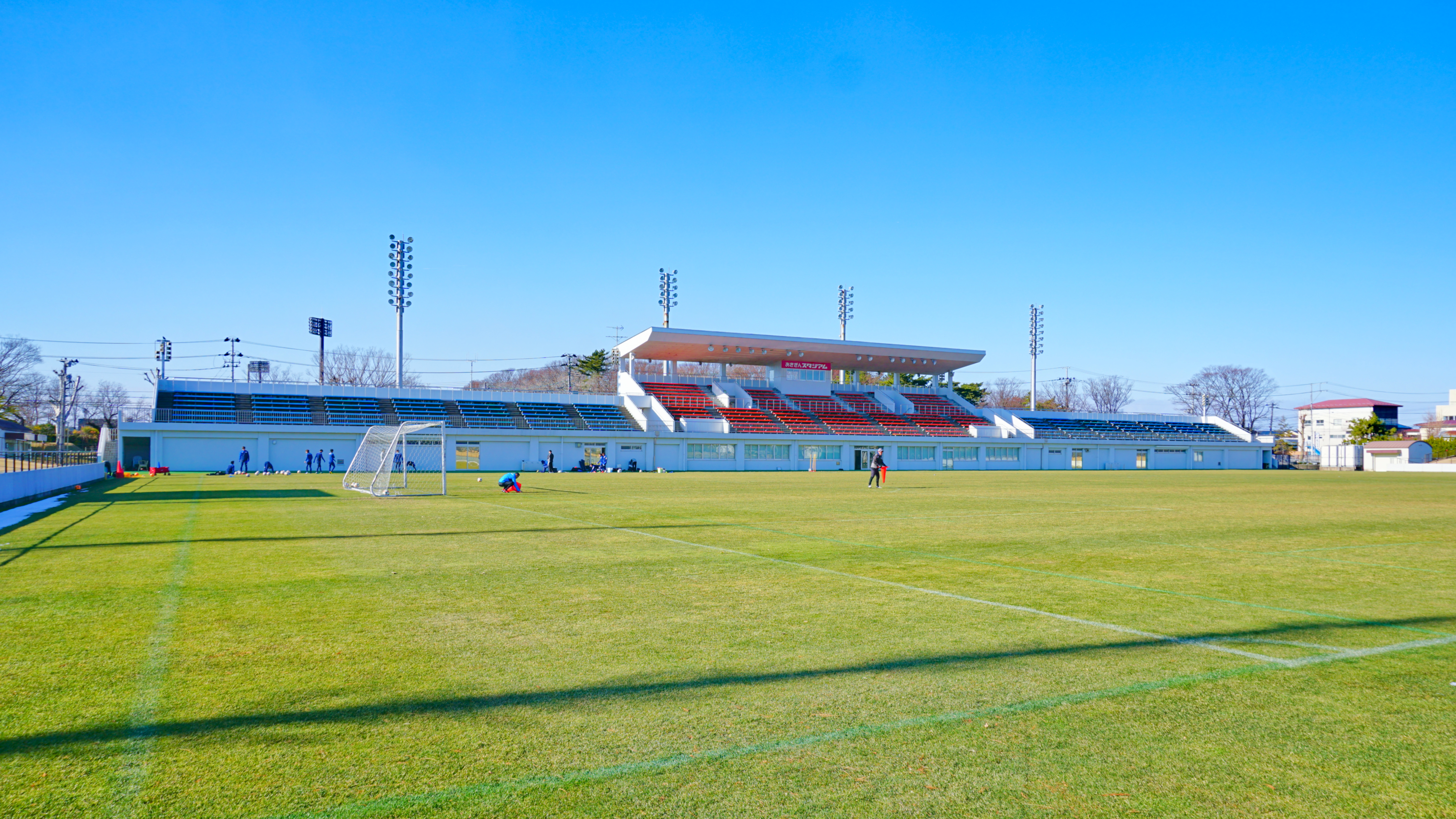
Akigin Stadium

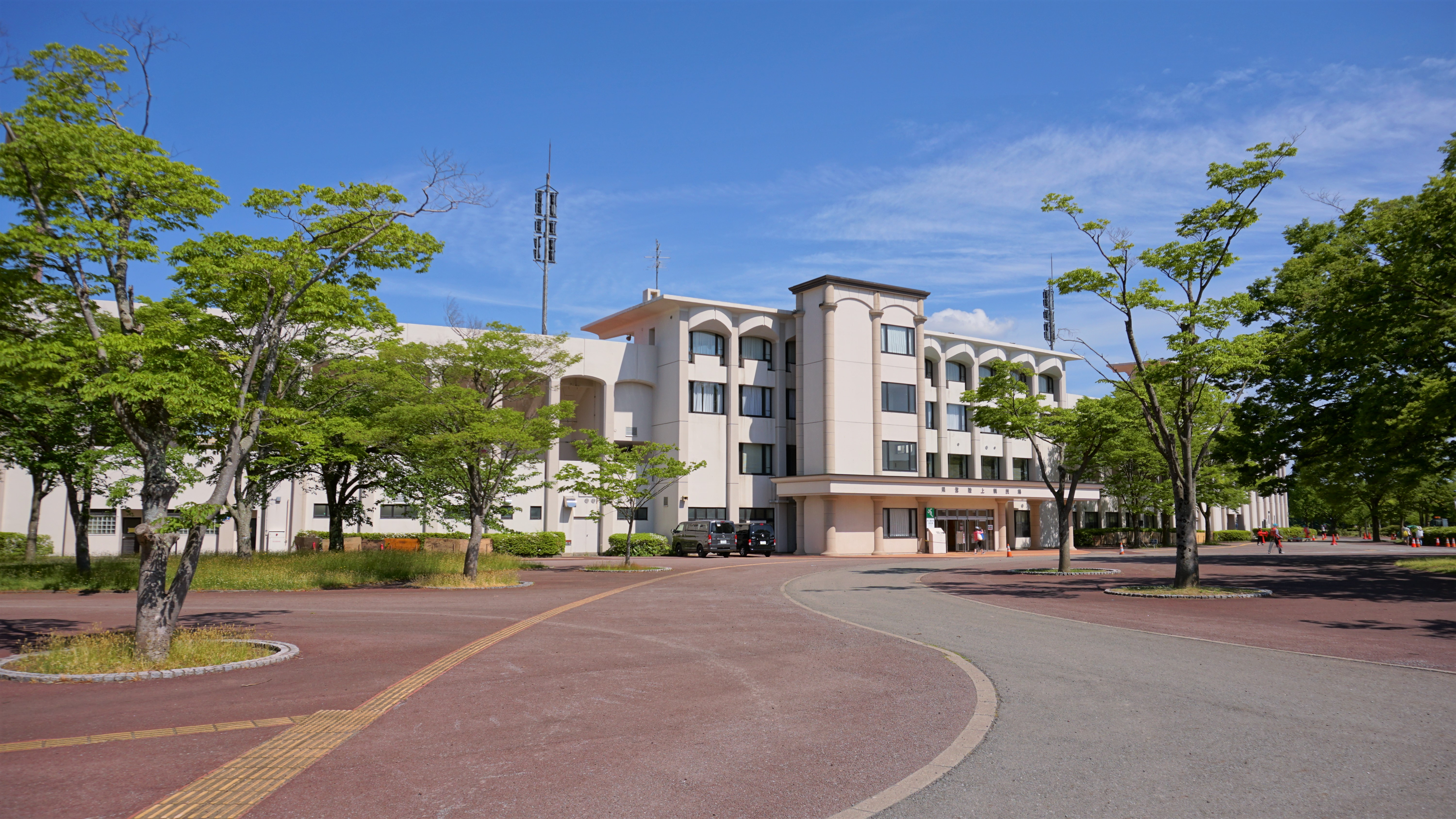
Akita Prefectural Central Park Athletic Stadium

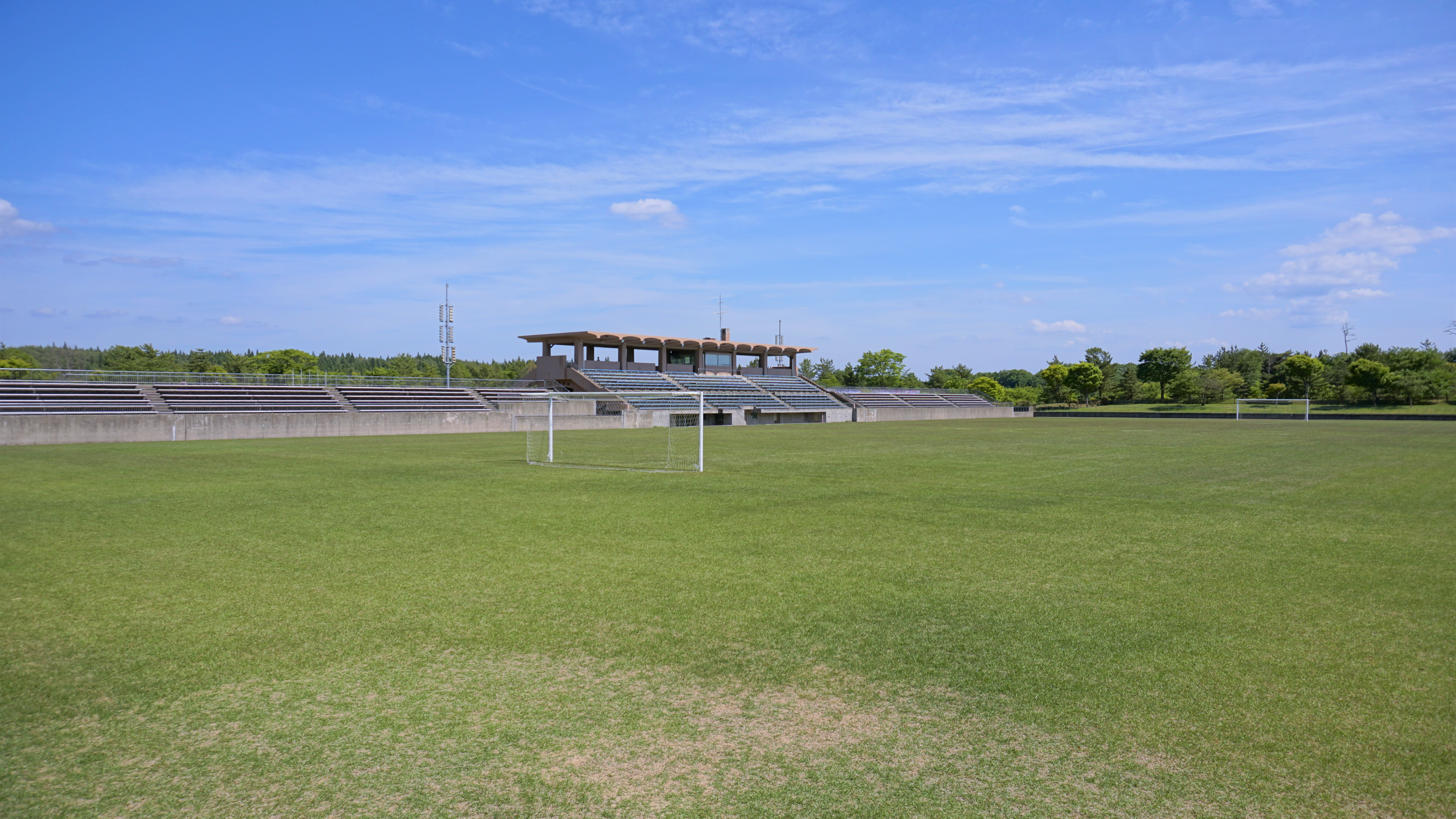
Akita Prefectural Central Park Playing Field

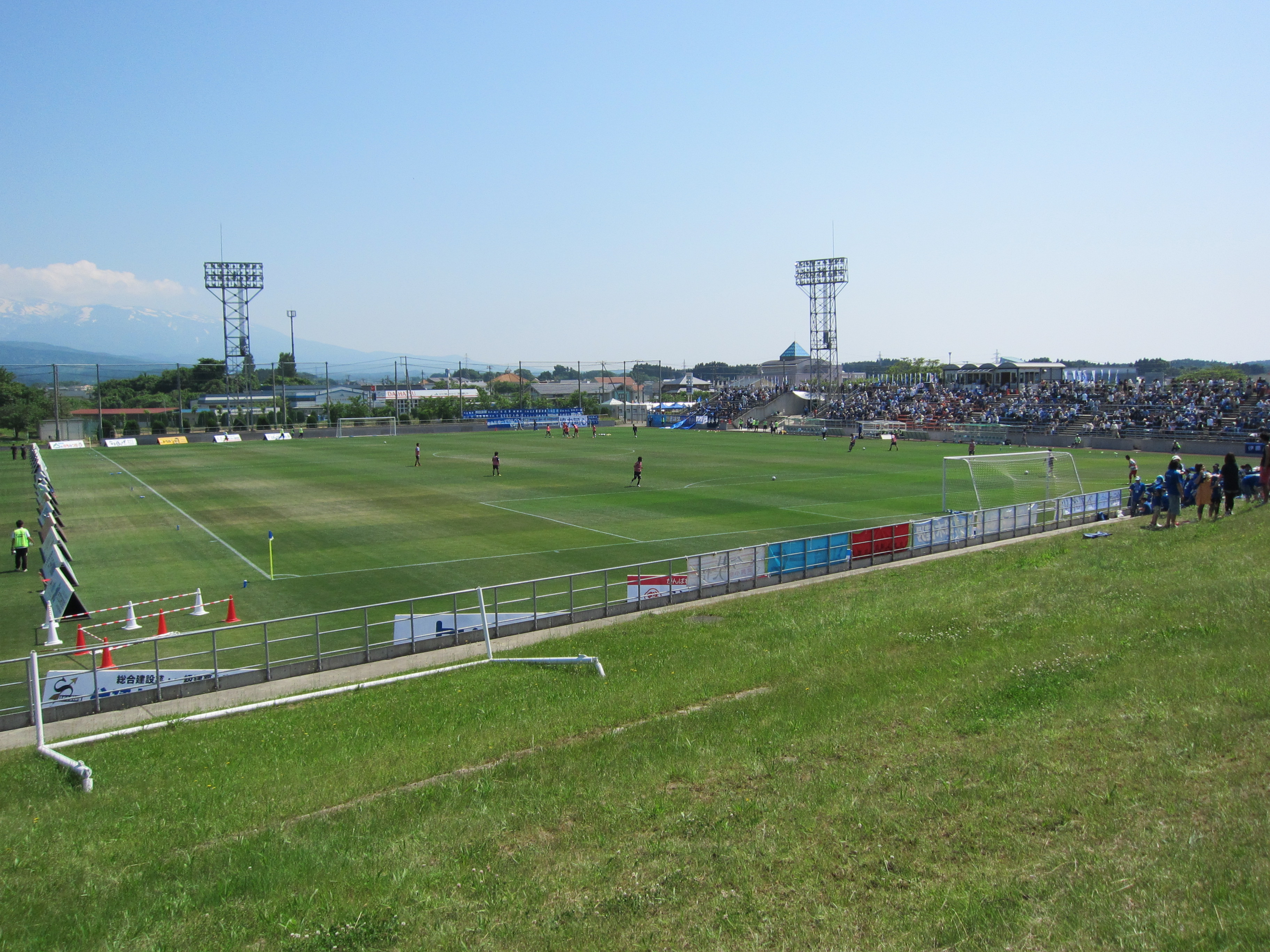
Nikaho Green Field

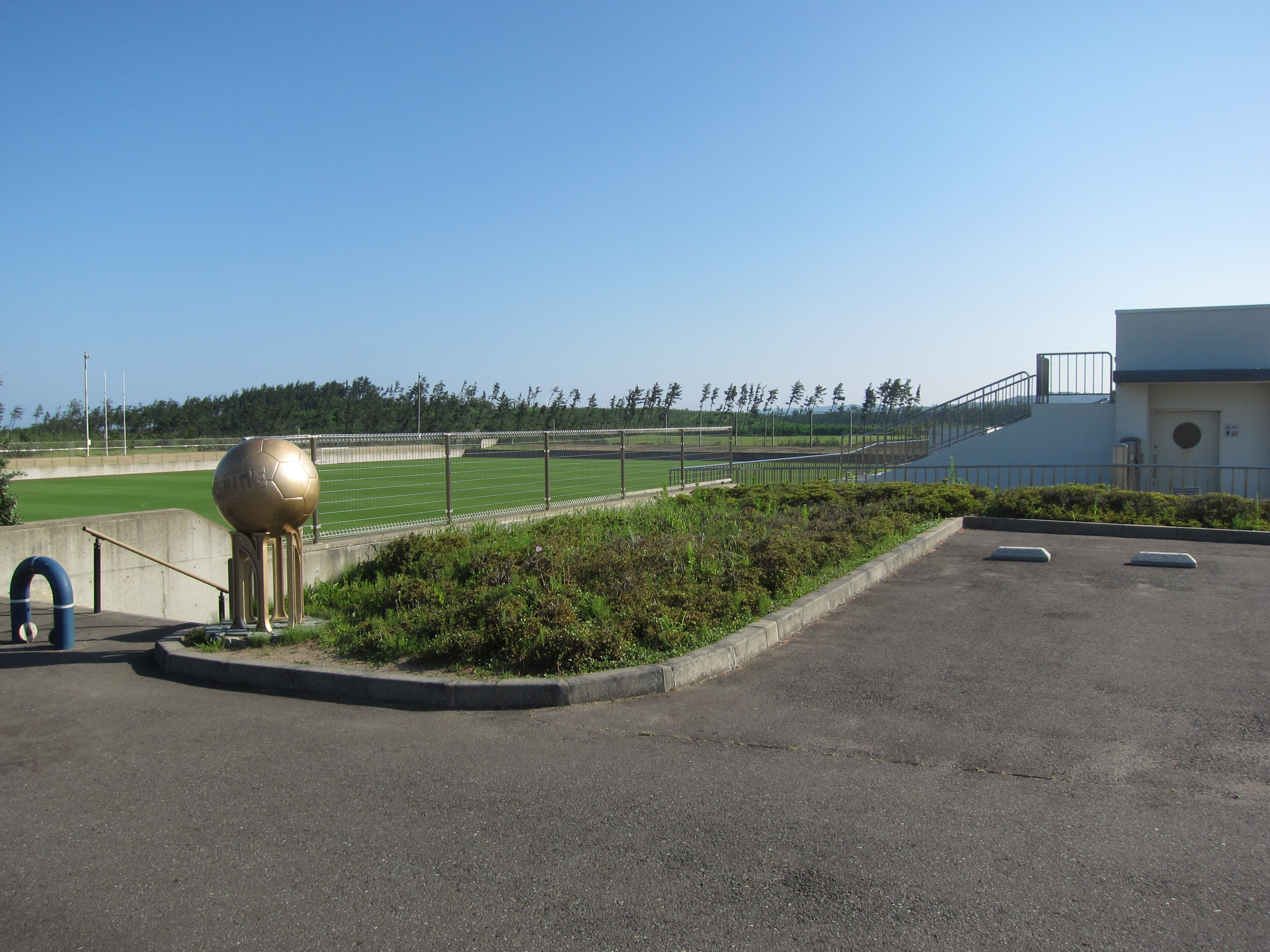
Nishime Country Park Soccer Field

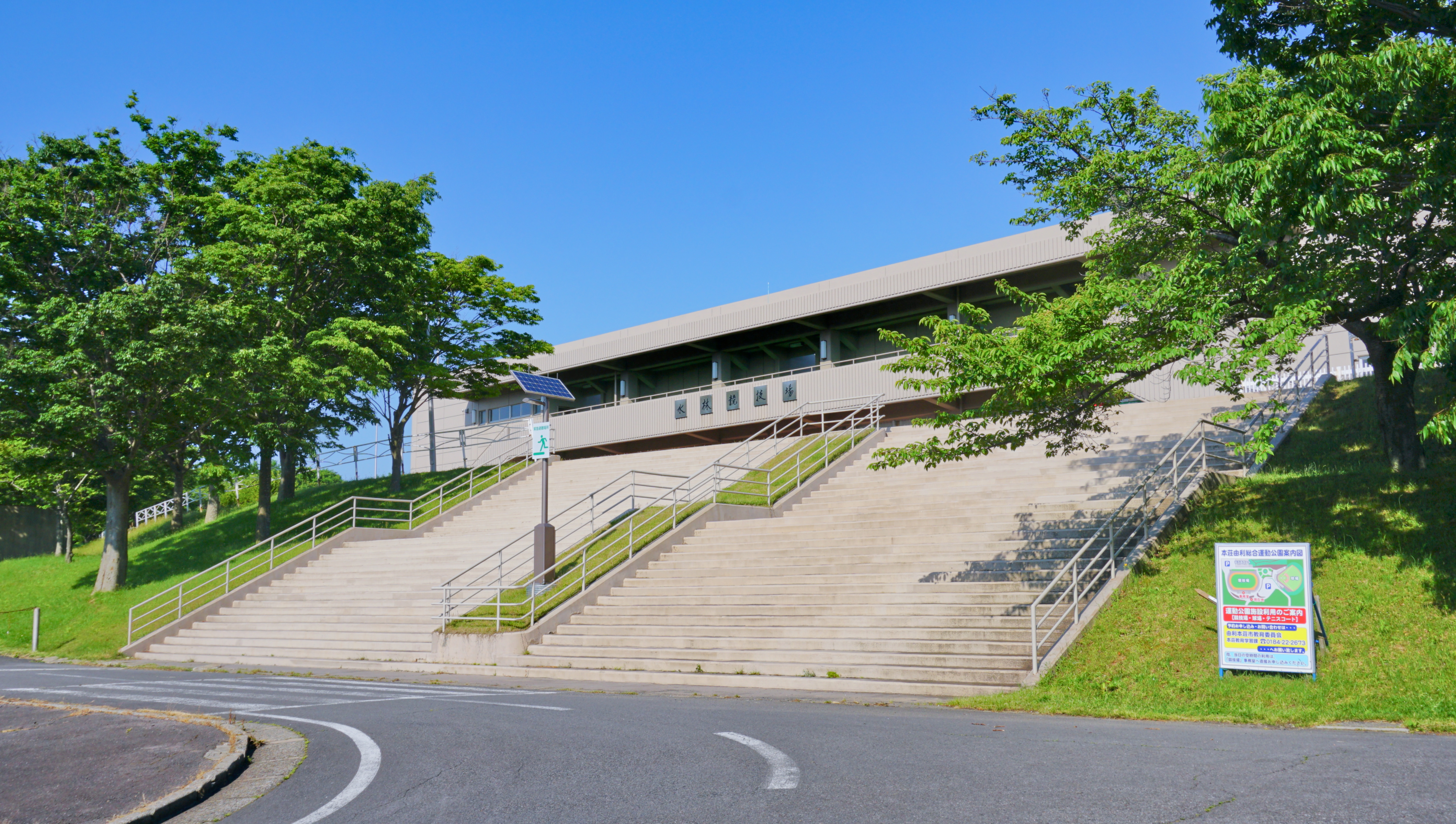
Mizubayashi Athletic Stadium

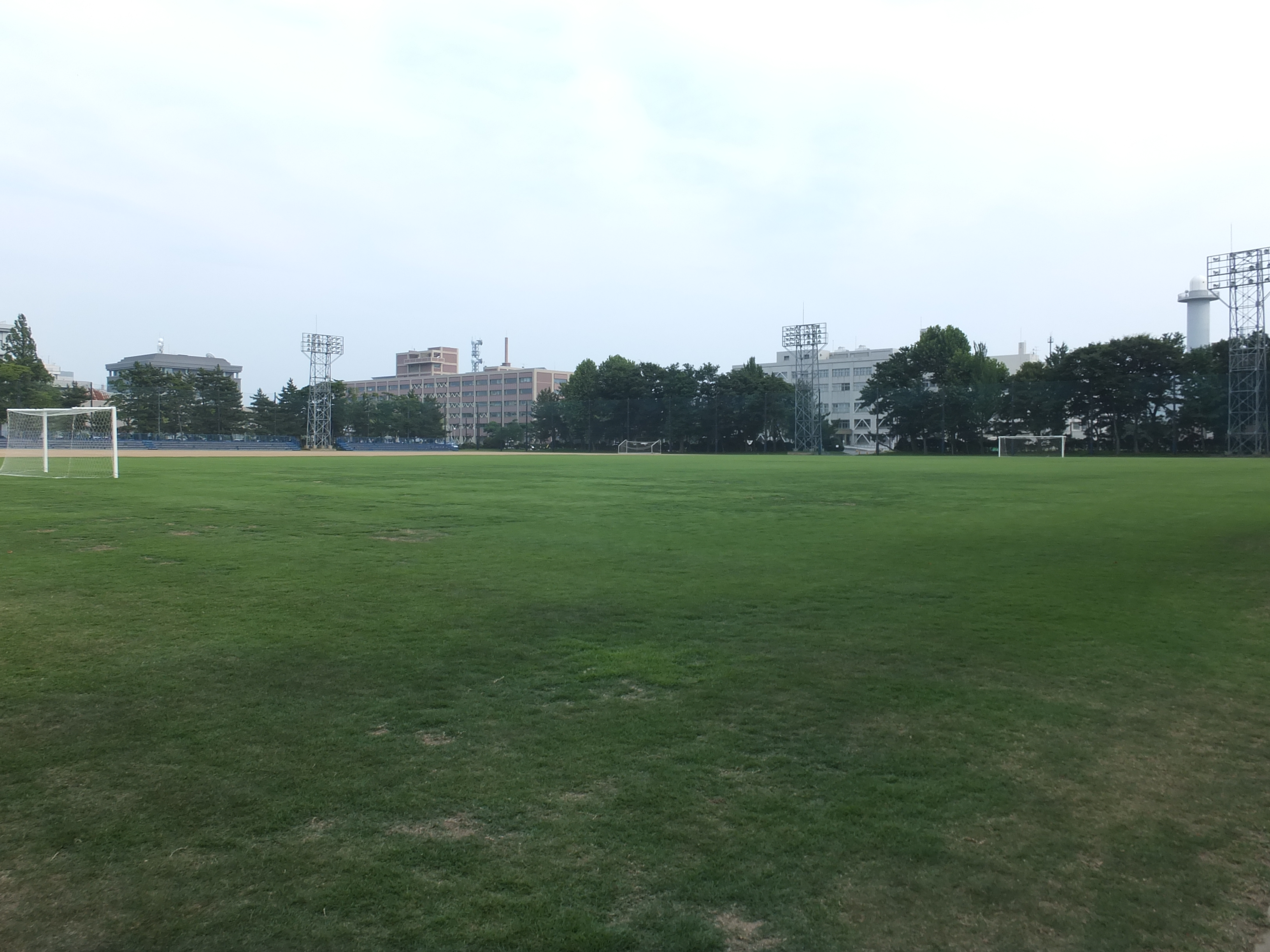
Space Project Dream Field

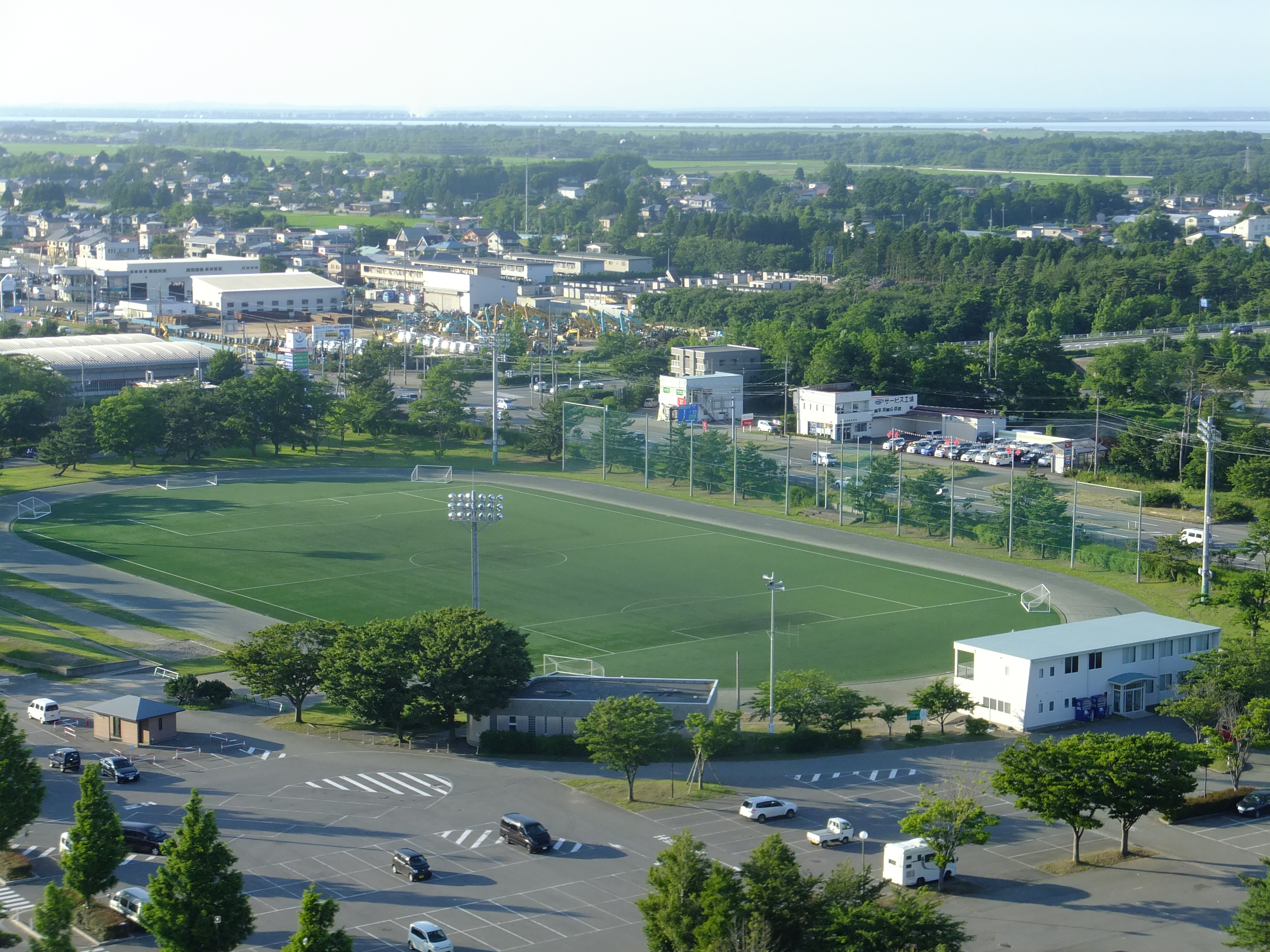
Akita Prefecture Football Centre

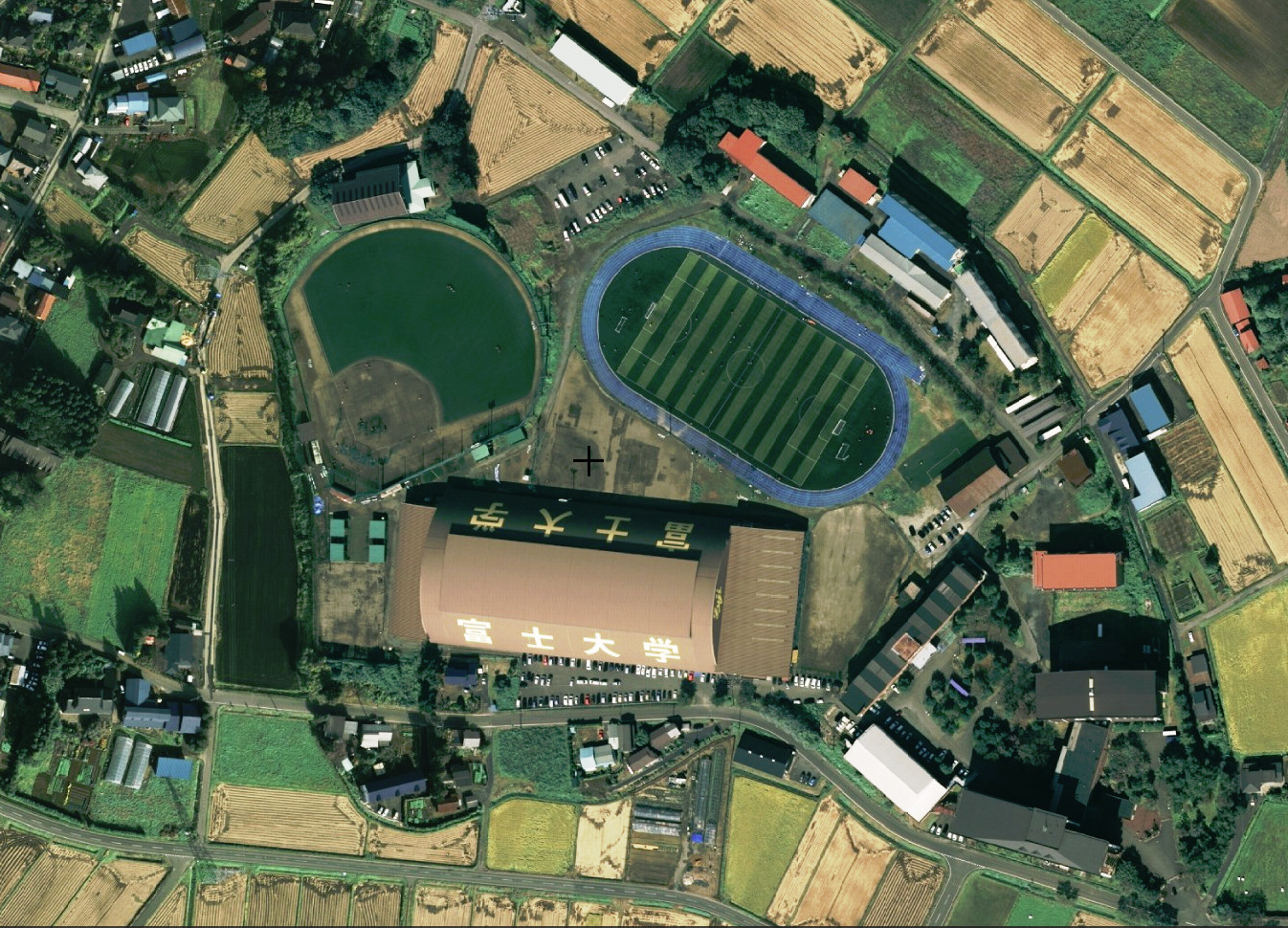
Fuji University

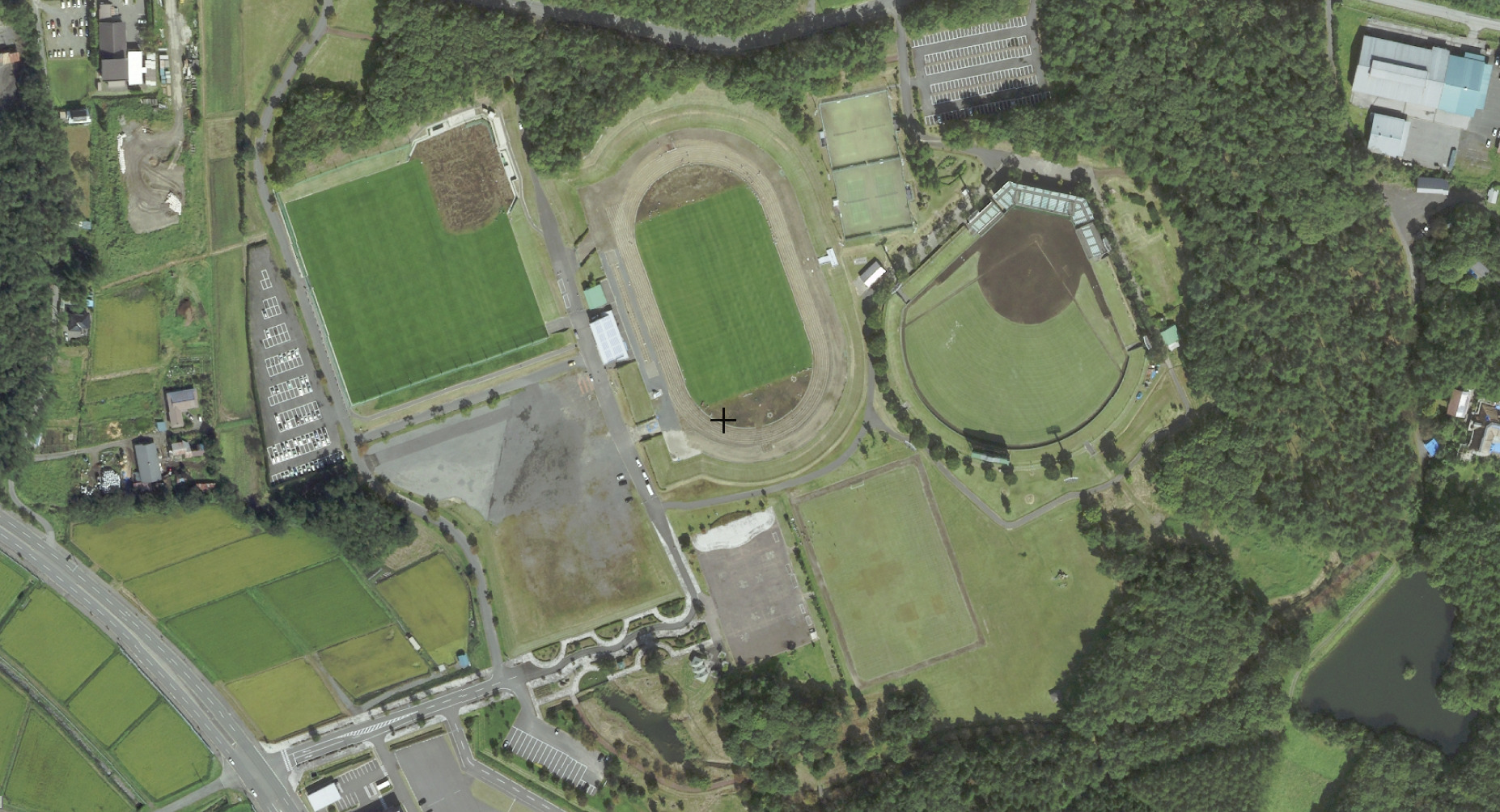
Tono Athletic Stadium

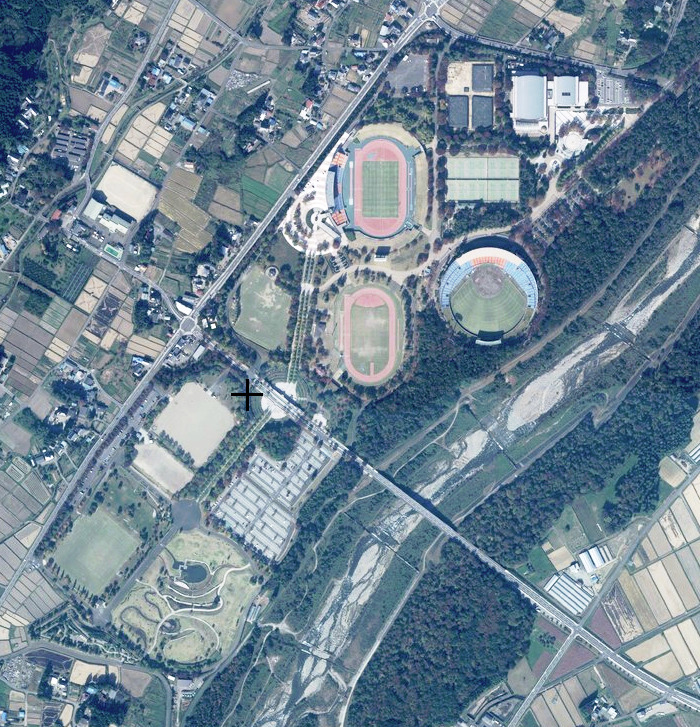
Azuma Sports Park

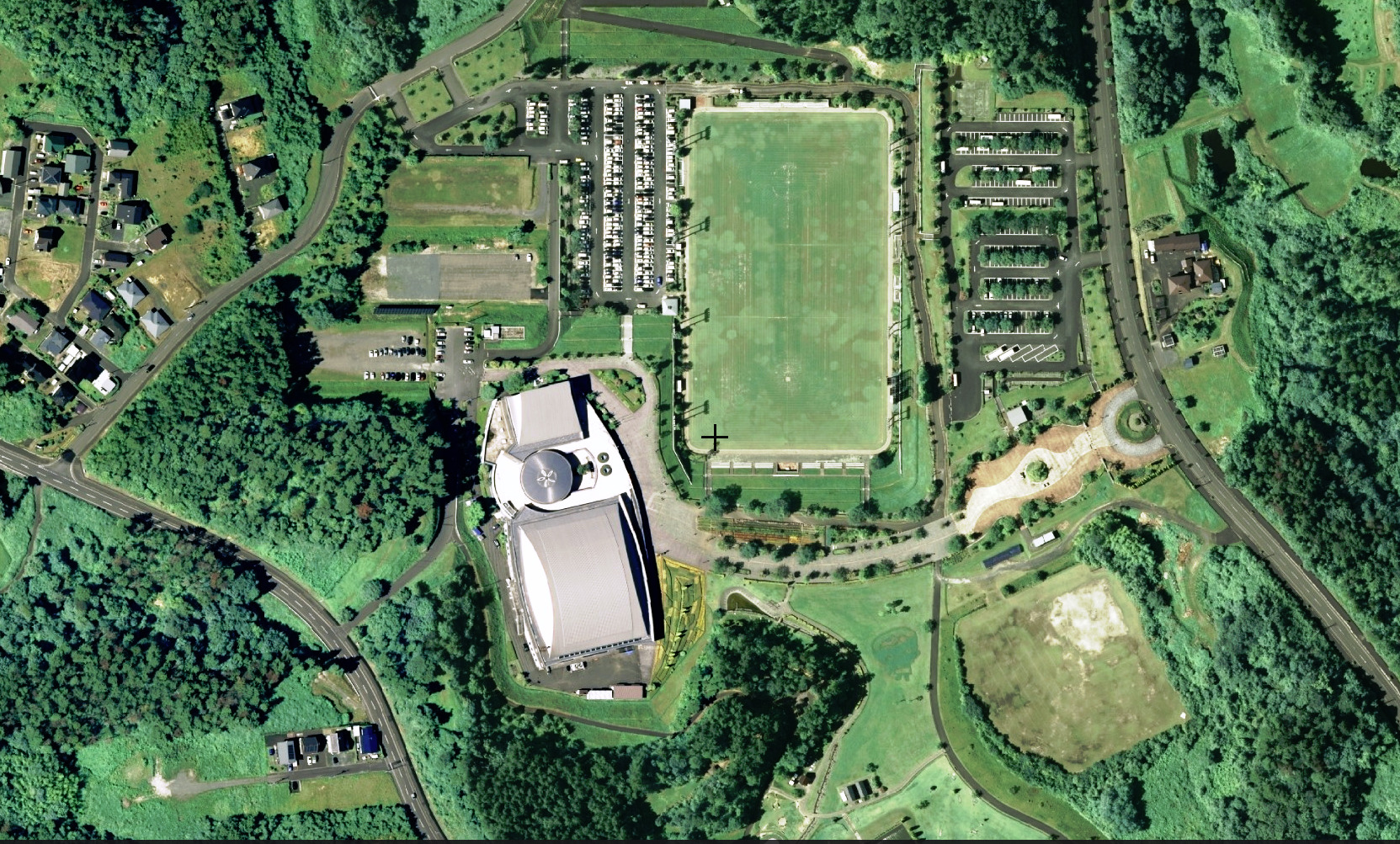
Oshu Fureai Park

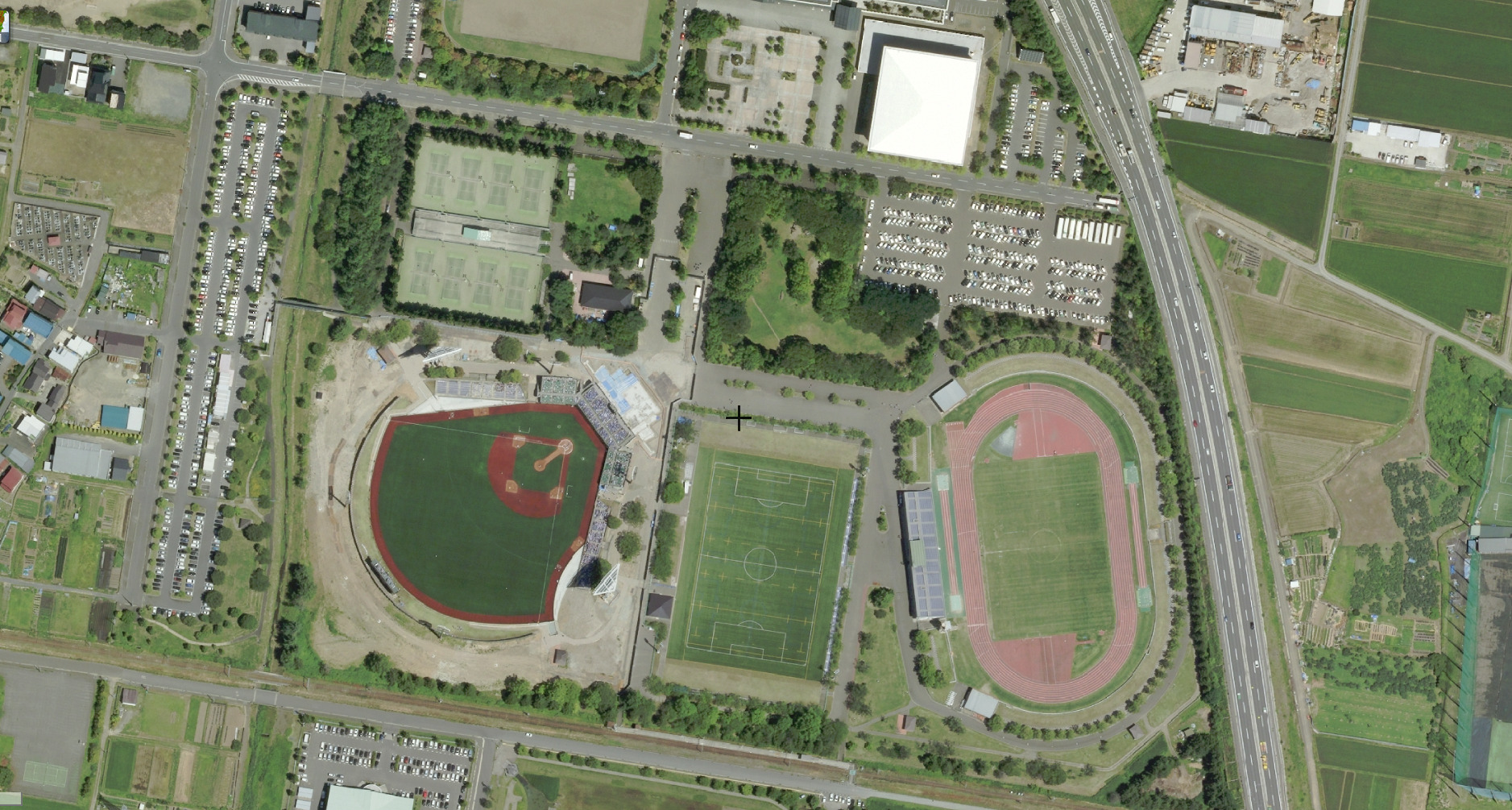
Hirosaki Sports Park

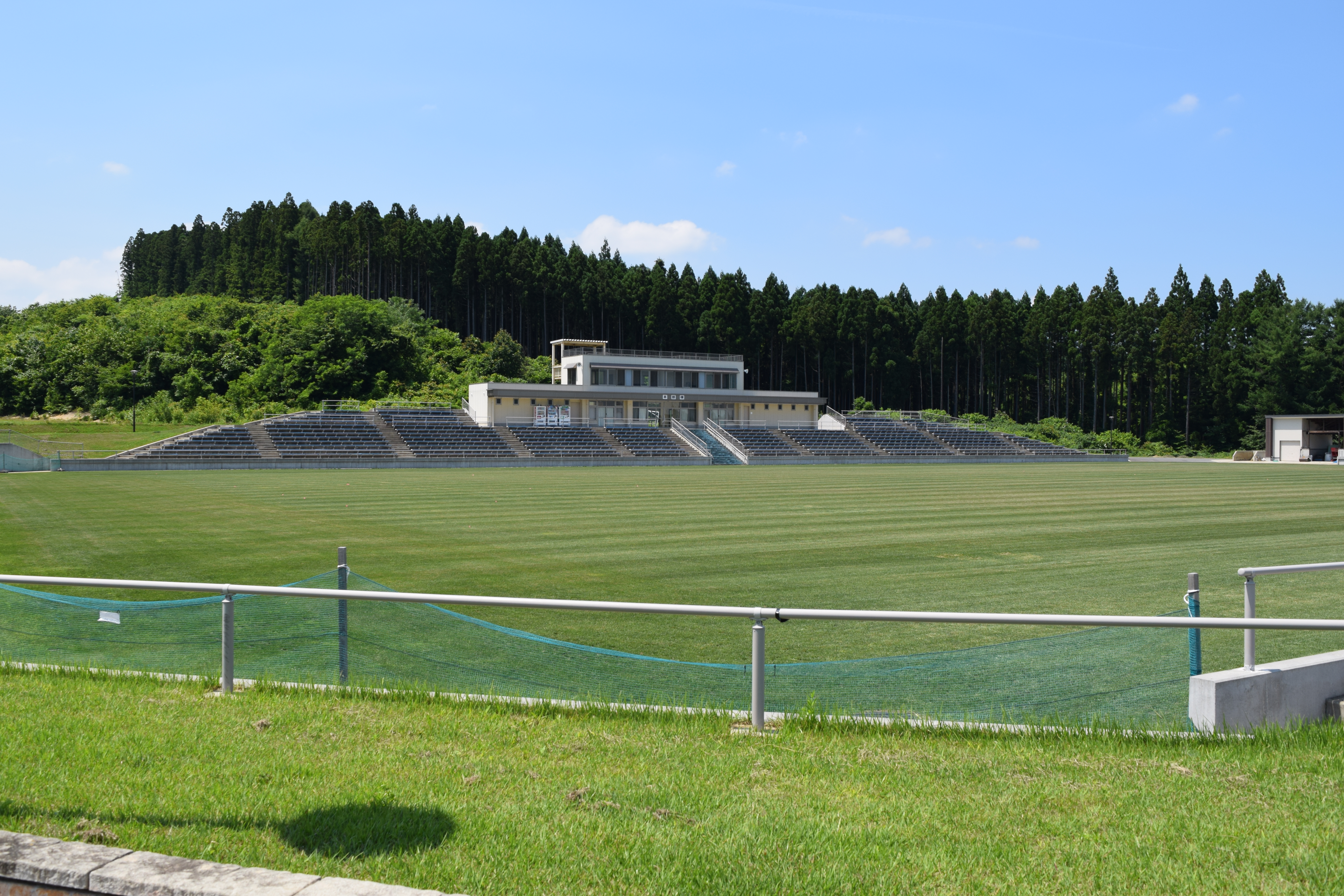
Towada Takamoriyama Playing Field

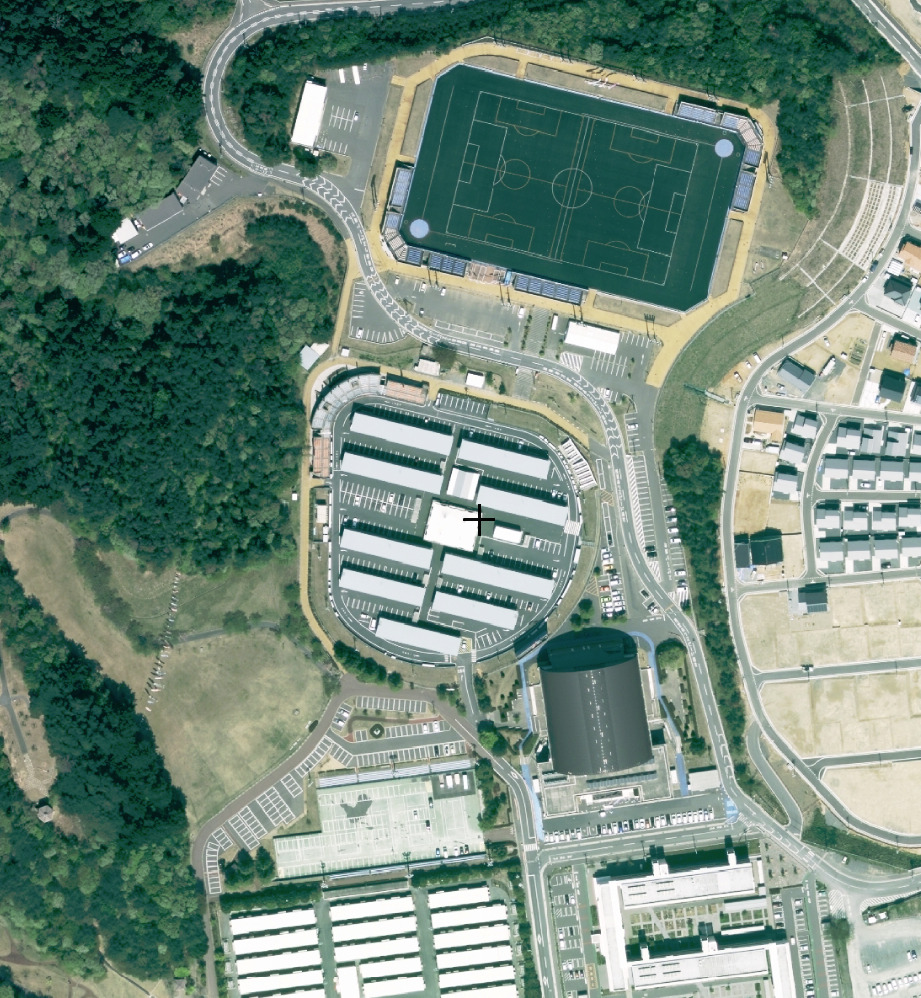
Onagawa Sports Park

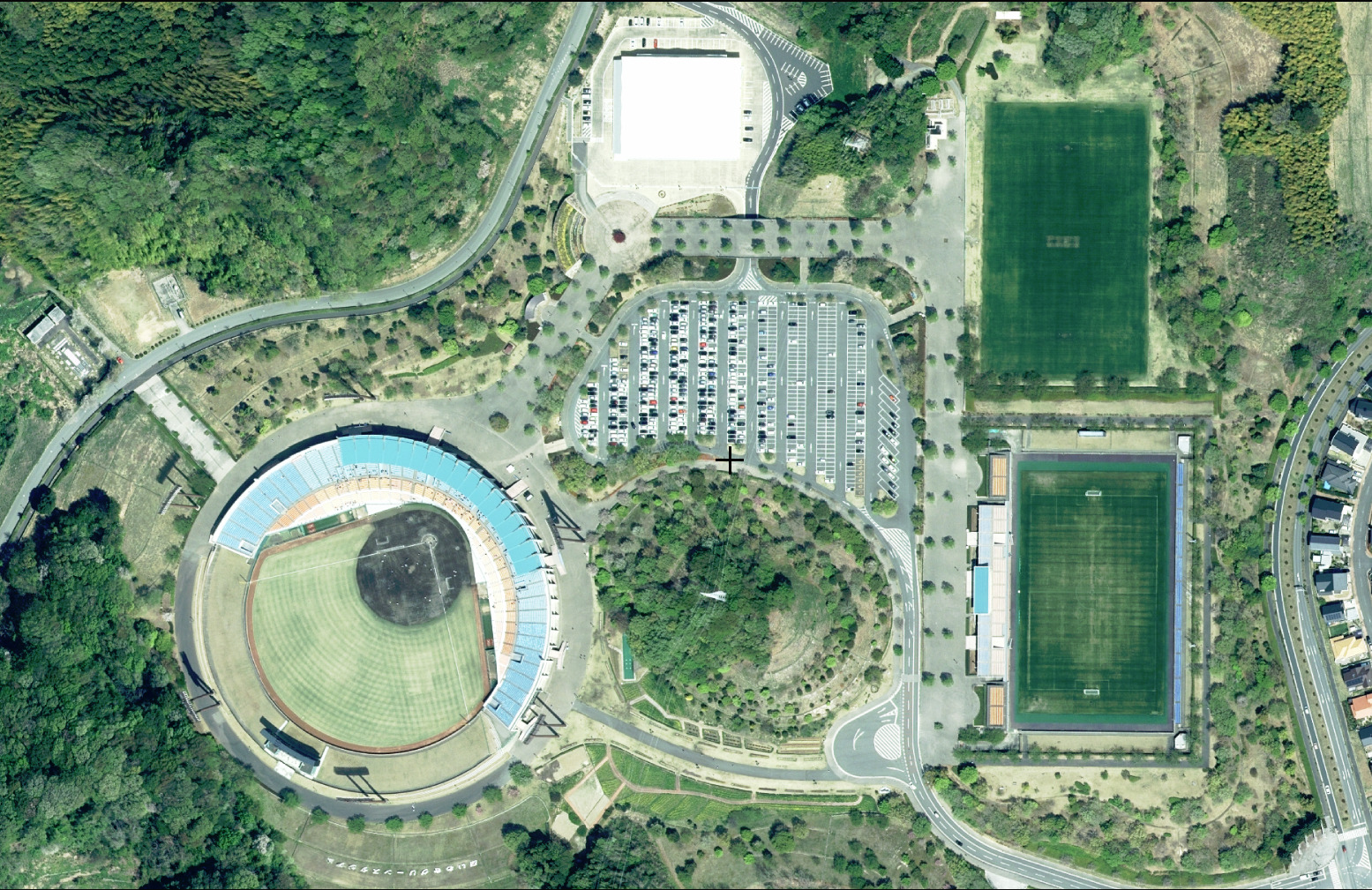
Iwaki Green Field

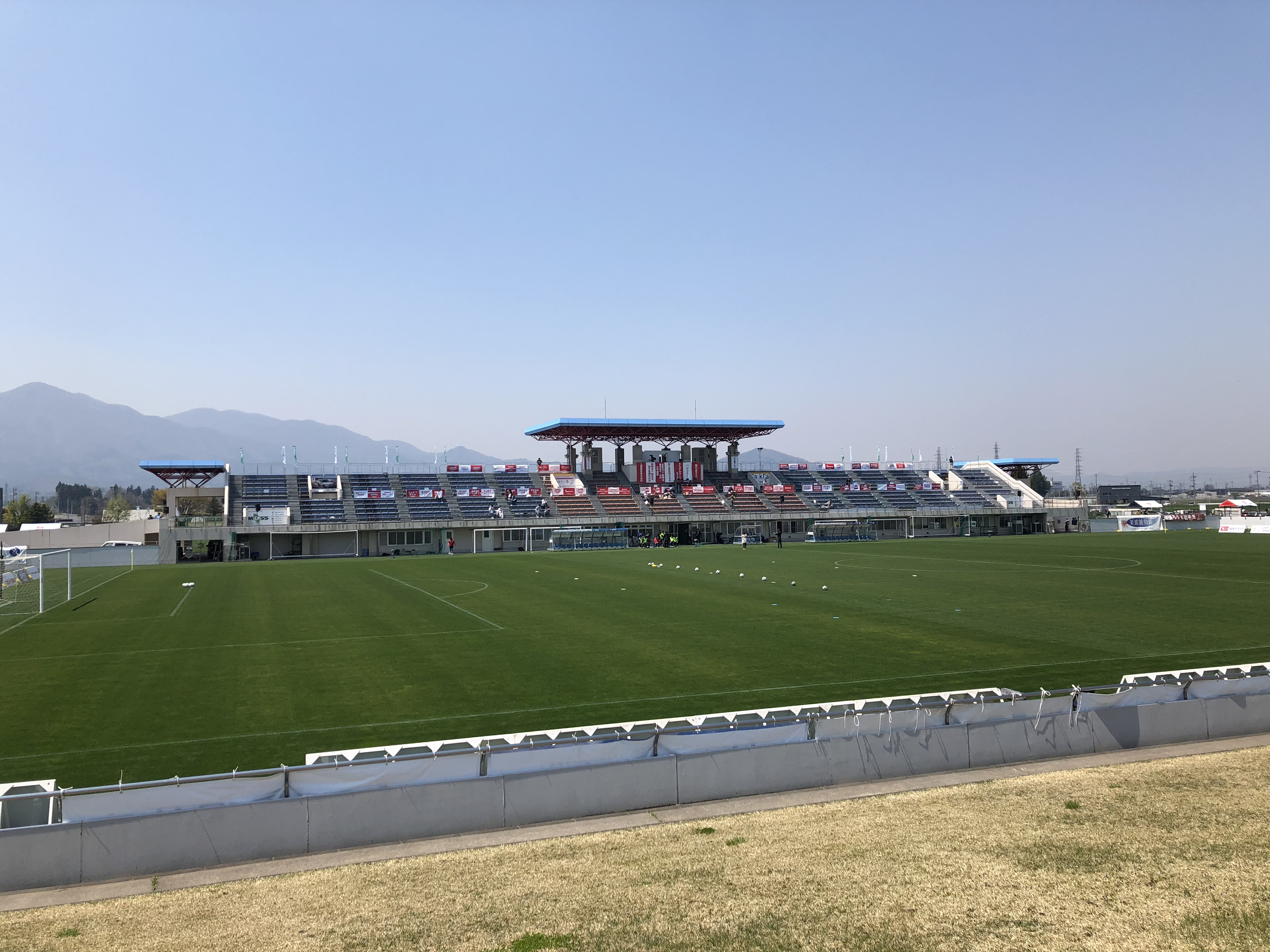
Iwagin Stadium

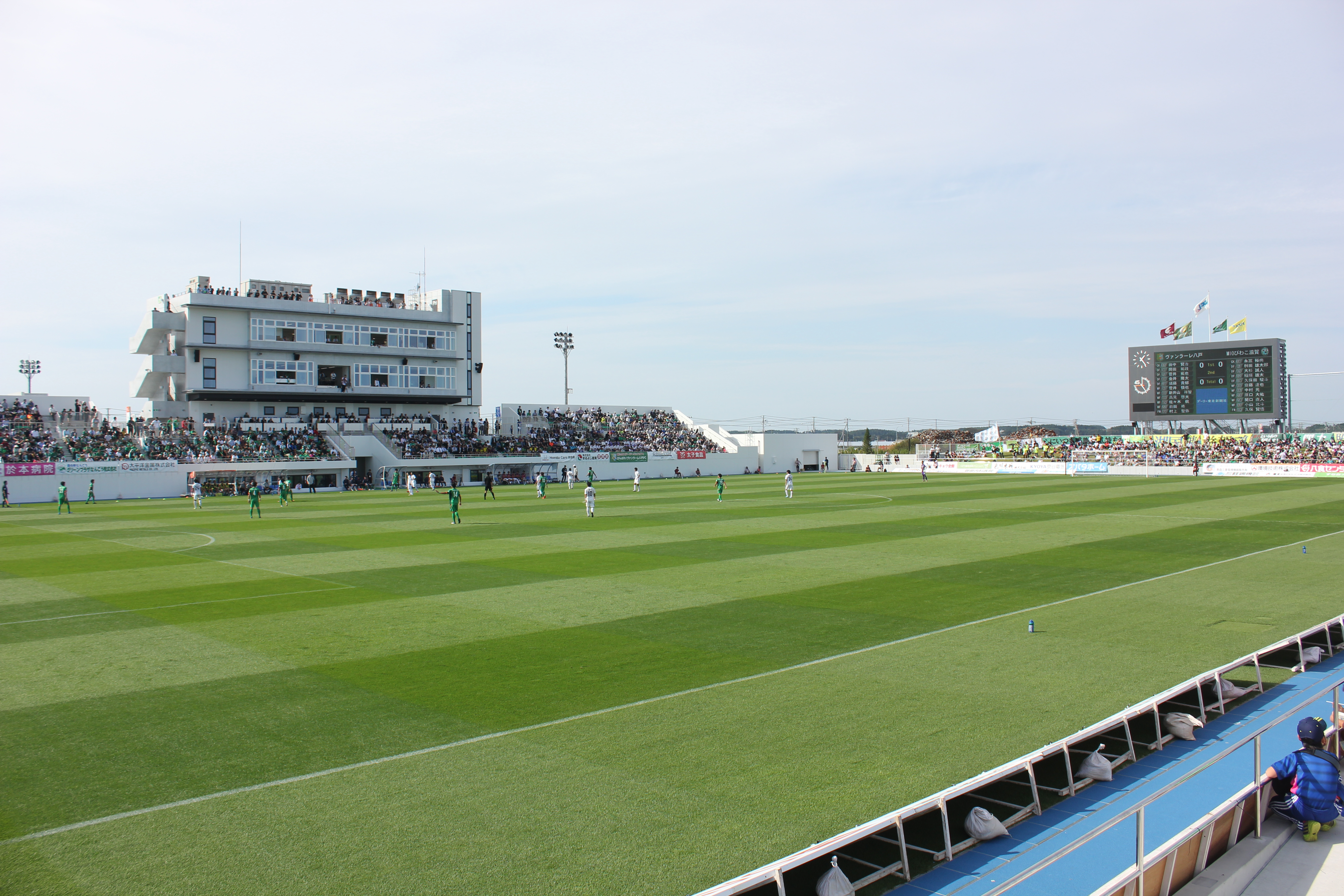
Taga Stadium

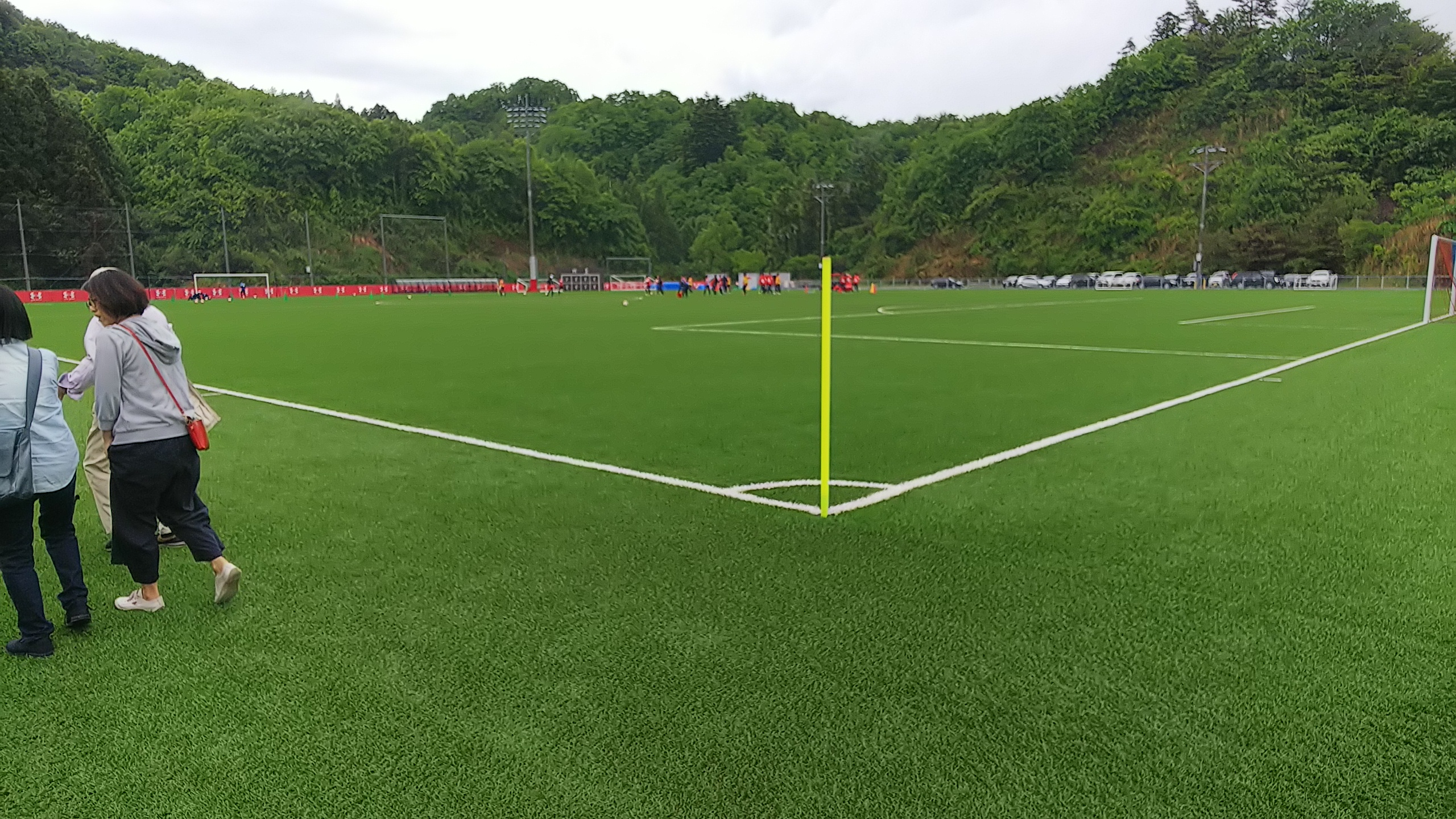
Iwaki FC Field

== See also ==
- Blaublitz Akita, the original TDK football club
