= Akita FC Cambiare =

Japanese football club

Akita FC Cambiare 秋田FCカンビアーレ
- Full name: Akita FC Cambiare
- Founded: 1973; 53 years ago
- Stadium: Soyu Stadium; Akita Prefectural Central Park Playing Field; Space Project Field; Akita Prefecture Football Centre
- Capacity: 20,125; 22,000; 4,992; 720
- League: Tohoku Soccer League Div. 2 North
- 2023: 4th of 10
Home colours	Away colours

Akita FC Cambiare (秋田FCカンビアーレ, Akita Efushi Kanbiare) is a Japanese football club based in Akita, the capital city of Akita Prefecture. They play in the Tohoku Soccer League. Their team colour is red.

== History ==
The club based in Akita, Akita, was founded as Ashikaga Komuten Kawabe FC in 1973. The team absorbed the Akita City Government FC in 2006 and were renamed as FC Akita Cambiare. It has been redefined again as Akita FC Cambiare in 2010.

== League & cup record ==
Champions	Runners-up	Third place	Promoted	Relegated

League											Emperor's Cup	Shakaijin Cup
Season	Division	Pos.	P	W	D	L	F	A	GD	Pts	Emperor's Cup	Shakaijin Cup
2005	Tohoku D2N	2nd	10	7	2	1	40	16	24	23	Did not qualify	Did not qualify
2006	Tohoku D2N	1st	14	13	1	0	46	14	32	40	Did not qualify	Did not qualify
2007	Tohoku D2N	1st	14	10	2	2	46	13	33	32	Did not qualify	Did not qualify
2008	Tohoku 1	4th	14	7	2	5	18	24	-6	23	Did not qualify	Did not qualify
2009	Tohoku 1	5th	14	5	2	7	17	43	-26	17	Did not qualify	Did not qualify
2010	Tohoku 1	5th	14	3	4	7	26	33	-7	13	Did not qualify	Did not qualify
2011	Tohoku 1	4th	12	6	1	5	56	29	27	19	Did not qualify	Did not qualify
2012	Tohoku 1	4th	12	5	1	6	21	36	-15	16	Did not qualify	Did not qualify
2013	Tohoku 1	10th	18	3	4	11	19	57	-38	13	Did not qualify	Did not qualify
2014	Tohoku 1	7th	18	6	2	10	27	57	-30	20	Did not qualify	Did not qualify
2015	Tohoku 1	10th	18	1	3	14	18	95	-77	6	Did not qualify	Did not qualify
2016	Tohoku D2N	2nd	18	14	2	2	57	18	39	44	Did not qualify	Did not qualify
2017	Tohoku D2N	1st	18	13	2	3	58	22	36	41	Did not qualify	Did not qualify
2018	Tohoku 1	7th	22	7	1	10	24	36	-12	18	Did not qualify	Did not qualify
2019	Tohoku 1	10th	18	3	1	14	21	86	-65	10	Did not qualify	Did not qualify
2020 †	Tohoku D2N	2nd	4	2	1	1	11	7	4	7	Did not qualify	‡ Competition cancelled
2021 †	Tohoku D2N	2nd	2	2	0	0	6	4	2	6	Did not qualify	‡ Competition cancelled
2022 †	Tohoku D2N	2nd	8	6	1	1	31	8	23	19	Did not qualify	Did not qualify
2023	Tohoku D2N	4th	13	5	2	6	25	24	1	17	Did not qualify	Did not qualify
2024 *	Tohoku D2N	7th	16	6	1	9	34	33	1	19	Did not qualify	Did not qualify
2025	Tohoku D2N	8th	14	1	3	10	20	46	-26	6	Did not qualify	Did not qualify
2026	Akita Prefectural; League	TBD										

Key

- Pos. = Position in league; P = Games played; W = Games won; D = Games drawn; L = Games lost; F = Goals scored; A = Goals conceded; GD = Goals difference; Pts = Points gained
- † Number of games played reduced by COVID-19 worldwide pandemic
- ‡ Competition cancelled due to COVID-19 pandemic in Japan
- Not relegated due to Morioka Zebra, who were relegated to the prefecture tier in Iwate.

== Honours ==
Akita FC Cambiare honours
Honour	No.	Years
Tohoku Soccer League	1	1985
Shakaijin Cup	1	1987
Tohoku Division 2 North	1	2001, 2006, 2007, 2017

== Current squad ==
As of 10 November 2025.

Note: Flags indicate national team as defined under FIFA eligibility rules; some limited exceptions apply. Players may hold more than one non-FIFA nationality.

No.	Pos.	Nation	Player
1	GK	JPN	Ryohei Saito
3	DF	JPN	Nashu Ito
4	DF	JPN	Riki Takisawa
5	DF	JPN	Rikuto Suhara
6	MF	JPN	Yuya Soma
7	FW	JPN	Yu Hasegawa
8	MF	JPN	Takashi Sugawara
10	MF	JPN	Akimitsu Hatakeyama
11	FW	JPN	Ryo Komatsu
13	MF	JPN	Sota Sasaki
14	DF	JPN	Masashi Iizuka
15	DF	JPN	Yohei Kudo
16	MF	JPN	Haruto Tajika
17	MF	JPN	Yuto Oyama

No.	Pos.	Nation	Player
19	MF	JPN	Riku Momma
20	MF	JPN	Kaito Kagaya
21	GK	JPN	Yasuhito Suzuki
22	MF	JPN	Riku Miura
24	FW	JPN	Shuma Suzuki
25	MF	JPN	Tatsuki Sasaki
26	FW	JPN	Makoto Miura
28	DF	JPN	Yuki Ito
29	DF	JPN	Iori Sasaki
32	DF	JPN	Ao Shoji
33	GK	JPN	Kaichi Sato
41	MF	JPN	Jumpei Kudo

=== Former players ===
- Kazuhiro Kawata
- Kenji Suzuki (footballer)
- Jumpei Saito
- Kazuya Inagaki
- Kazuki Sato
- Masatoshi Ozawa

== Emperor's Cup Prefectural Match Records ==
1999-09-12 Akita Prefecture Final	TDK	2–1	Akita City Government	Akita, Akita
		Report		Stadium: Yabase Athletic Field

2000-09-03 Akita Prefecture Final	TDK	5–0	Akita City Government	Yuwa, Akita
		Report		Stadium: Akita Prefectural Central Park

2002-09-08 Akita Prefecture Final	TDK	2–1	Akita City Government	Akita, Akita
		Report		Stadium: Akita Yabase Playing Field

2003-09-07 Akita Prefecture Final	TDK	1–0	Akita City Government	Akita, Akita
		Report; Report		Stadium: Akita Yabase Playing Field

2004-09-05 Akita Prefecture Final	TDK	5–0	Akita City Government	Akita, Akita
	Kasuga 32', 73', 80', 85'; Matsuda 81'	Report

2005-08-21 Akita Prefecture Final	TDK	9–1	Akita City Government	Akita, Akita
14:00		Report		Stadium: Yabase Athletic Field

2006-08-05 Akita Prefecture round	TDK	13–0	Akita City Government	Yurihonjo, Akita
15:00	Togashix3; Yokoyamax3; Narita; Harada; Kaga; Fujiwara; Miurax3	Report		Stadium: Nishime Country Park Soccer Field

2006-08-06 Akita Prefecture Final	TDK	3–1	Akita FC Cambiare	Akita, Akita
15:00	Togashi; Takano; Noguchi	Report		Stadium: Akita Yabase Playing Field

2008-08-31 Akita Prefecture Final	TDK	1–0	Akita FC Cambiare	Akita, Akita
	Matsugae	Report		Stadium: Akita Yabase Playing Field

2010-08-29 Akita Prefecture Final	Blaublitz Akita	6–0	Akita FC Cambiare	Akita, Akita
13:04	Keiichi Kubotax３; Yokoyama; Matsuda; Togashi	Report; Report		Stadium: Akita Yabase Playing Field

2011-08-28 Akita Prefecture Final	Blaublitz Akita	1–0	Akita FC Cambiare	Akita, Akita
13:05	Keiichi Kubota	Report		Stadium: Akita Yabase Playing Field; Attendance: 650

2012-08-26 Akita Prefecture Final	Blaublitz Akita	2–0	Akita FC Cambiare	Akita, Akita
	Imai; Maeyama	Report		Stadium: Yabase Athletic Field

2013-08-25 Akita Prefecture Final	Blaublitz Akita	9–1	Akita FC Cambiare	Akita, Akita
13:00	Miyoshi 11', 26', 33'; Matsuda 27', 46', 48', 69'; Maeyama 72'; Handa 73'	Report	Sugawara 80'	Stadium: Yabase Athletic Field; Attendance: 500

== Songs and chants ==
City emblem

- City Anthem of Akita - Audio

=== Lyrics ===
Official

朝太平の峰に明け、岸壁輝く秋田港
羽越奥羽の交わる所
北日本を開きゆく使命に燃える大秋田

Rōmaji

Asa Taihei no Mine ni ake
Ganpeki Kagayaku Akitako
Uetsu Ou no Majiwarutokoro
Kitanippon wo hirakiyuku
Shimei ni moeru Daiakita
