= Go Togashi =

Japanese association football player

Go Togashi 富樫 豪
Personal information
- Full name: Go Togashi
- Date of birth: 4 June 1984 (age 42)
- Place of birth: Akita City, Akita, Japan
- Height: 1.75 m (5 ft 9 in)
- Position: Forward

Team information
- Current team: Akita FC Cambiare
- Number: 13

Youth career
- 2000–2002: Akita Commercial High School

Senior career*
Years	Team	Apps	(Gls)
2003	Sagawa Kyubin Tohoku		
2004–2005	Shiogama Wiese		
2006–2009	TDK	100	(39)
2010–2012	Blaublitz Akita	70	(2)
2013–2016	TDK Shinwakai	41	(40)
2017-	Akita FC Cambiare	56	(38)
- * Club domestic league appearances and goals as of 9 June 2023

Go Togashi (富樫 豪, Togashi Gō; born 4 June 1984) is a Japanese football player who played for Blaublitz Akita.

== Club statistics ==
Updated to 31 December 2022.

Club performance			League		League Cup		Total	
Season	Club	League	Apps	Goals	Apps	Goals	Apps	Goals
Japan			League		Emperor's Cup		Total	
2001	Akita Shogyo HS	-	0	0	1	0	1	0
2006	TDK	Tohoku	13	12	2	0	15	12
2007	TDK	JFL	27	10	4	1	31	11
2008	TDK	JFL	26	14	1	0	27	14
2009	TDK	JFL	34	3	1	0	35	3
2010	Blaublitz Akita	JFL	18	1	2	1	20	2
2011	Blaublitz Akita	JFL	25	0	1	0	26	0
2012	Blaublitz Akita	JFL	27	1	2	0	29	1
2013	TDK Shinwakai	Tohoku	3	3	0	0	3	3
2014	TDK Shinwakai	Tohoku	11	9	0	0	11	9
2015	TDK Shinwakai	Tohoku	10	11	0	0	10	11
2016	TDK Shinwakai	Tohoku	17	17	0	0	17	17
2017	Akita FC Cambiare	Tohoku	15	16	0	0	15	16
2018	Akita FC Cambiare	Tohoku	18	8	0	0	18	8
2019	Akita FC Cambiare	Tohoku	13	9	0	0	13	9
2020	Akita FC Cambiare	Tohoku	3	5	0	0	3	5
2021	Akita FC Cambiare	Tohoku	2	0	0	0	2	0
2022	Akita FC Cambiare	Tohoku	5	0	0	0	5	0
2023	Akita FC Cambiare	Tohoku	0	0	0	0	0	0
Career total			267	119	14	2	281	121
