= Kazuhiro Kawata =

Japanese footballer

Personal information
- Full name: Kazuhiro Kawata
- Date of birth: June 11, 1982 (age 44)
- Place of birth: Fukuoka, Japan
- Height: 1.73 m (5 ft 8 in)
- Position: Midfielder

Youth career
- 2001–2004: Fukuoka University

Senior career*
| Years | Team | Apps | (Gls) |
| 2005–2006 | Oita Trinita | 10 | (0) |
| 2007 | Gainare Tottori | 31 | (3) |
| 2008 | Matsumoto Yamaga | 11 | (2) |
| 2009 | FC Ganju Iwate | | |
| 2010 | Akita FC Cambiare | 13 | (1) |
| 2011–2016 | Blaublitz Akita | 167 | (7) |
| Total | | 232 | (13) |
- * Club domestic league appearances and goals

Kazuhiro Kawata (川田 和宏, Kawata Kazuhiro; born June 11, 1982 in Fukuoka) is a former Japanese football player who last appeared for Blaublitz Akita.

Kamata previously played for Oita Trinita in J. League Division 1.

== Career statistics ==
Appearances and goals by club, season and competition
| Club | Season | League | | | Emperor's Cup | | J.League Cup | | Total | |
| Club | Season | Division | Apps | Goals | Apps | Goals | Apps | Goals | Apps | Goals |
|---|---|---|---|---|---|---|---|---|---|---|
| Oita Trinita | 2005 | J1 League | 9 | 0 | 0 | 0 | 4 | 0 | 13 | 0 |
| Oita Trinita | 2006 | J1 League | 1 | 0 | 0 | 0 | 0 | 0 | 1 | 0 |
| Oita Trinita | Total | | 10 | 0 | 0 | 0 | 4 | 0 | 14 | 0 |
| Gainare Tottori | 2007 | JFL | 31 | 3 | 2 | 0 | — | | 33 | 3 |
| Matsumoto Yamaga | 2008 | JRL (Hokushinetsu) | 11 | 2 | 4 | 0 | — | | 15 | 2 |
| Akita FC Cambiare | 2010 | JRL (Tohoku) | 13 | 1 | — | | — | | 13 | 1 |
| Blaublitz Akita | 2011 | JFL | 33 | 2 | 2 | 1 | — | | 35 | 3 |
| Blaublitz Akita | 2012 | JFL | 32 | 2 | 2 | 0 | — | | 34 | 2 |
| Blaublitz Akita | 2013 | JFL | 14 | 1 | 2 | 0 | — | | 16 | 1 |
| Blaublitz Akita | 2014 | J3 League | 32 | 0 | 2 | 0 | — | | 34 | 0 |
| Blaublitz Akita | 2015 | J3 League | 35 | 2 | 2 | 0 | — | | 37 | 2 |
| Blaublitz Akita | 2016 | J3 League | 21 | 0 | 1 | 0 | — | | 22 | 0 |
| Blaublitz Akita | Total | | 167 | 7 | 11 | 1 | 0 | 0 | 188 | 8 |
| Career total | | | 232 | 13 | 17 | 1 | 4 | 0 | 253 | 14 |
