= Akita Prefecture Football Centre =

Football stadium in Katagami, Akita, Japan

- 潟上市鞍掛沼公園多目的広場 秋田県フットボールセンター
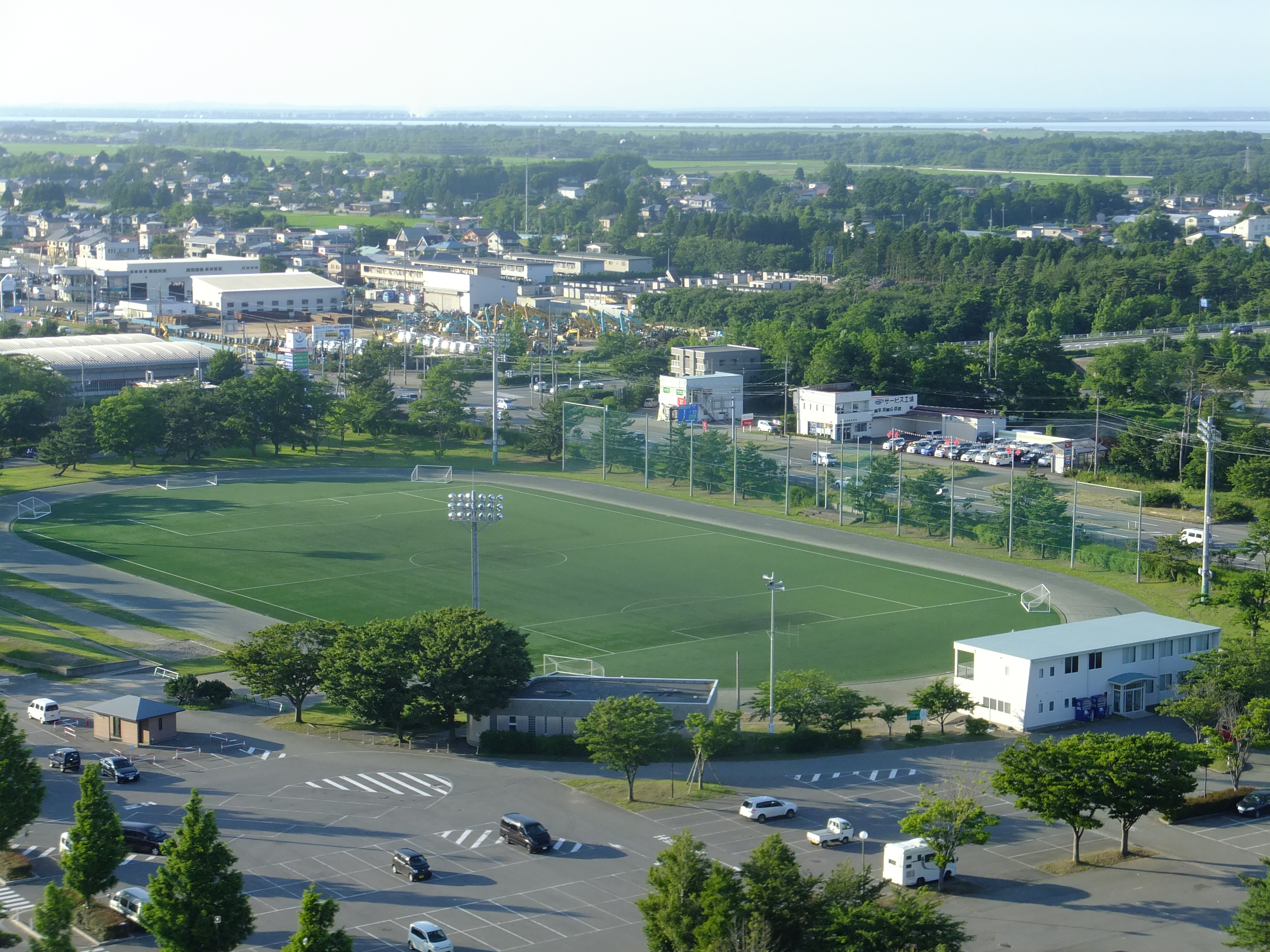
- View from the Tower

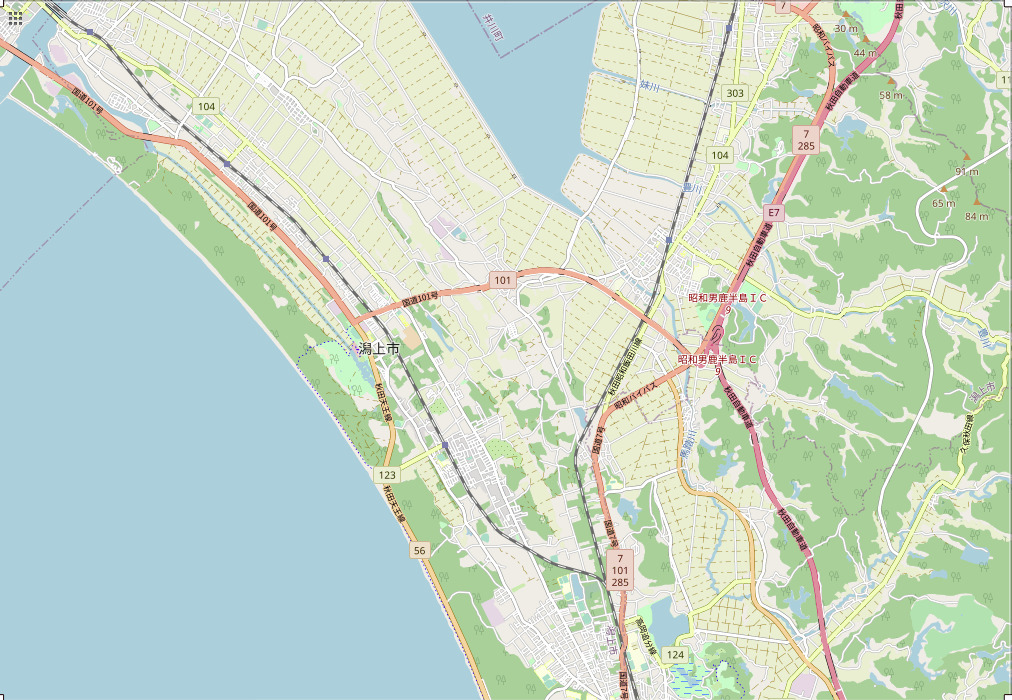
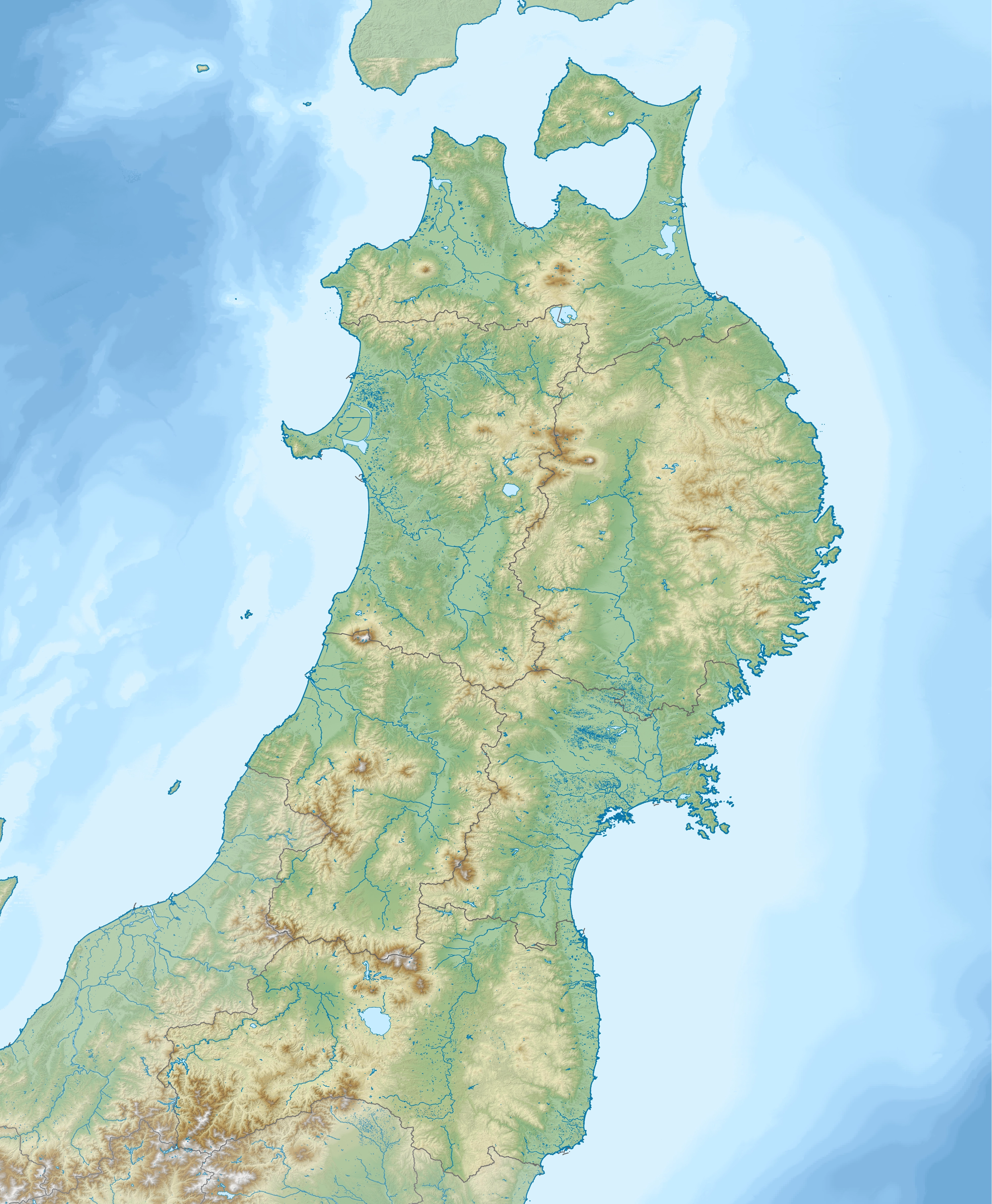
- Location within Katagami, Akita Location within Akita Prefecture Location within Tohoku Region Location within Japan
- Interactive map of Akita Prefecture Football Centre
- Former names: Katagami City Kurakakenuma Park Multi-purpose Square
- Address: 109-1, Tenno Aza Egawakamiyachi; Katagami, Akita; Japan
- Coordinates: 39°51′33.4″N 140°00′32.1″E
- Owner: City of Katagami
- Operator: Katagami Park Centre
- Surface: Artificial Turf
- Field size: 10,360m²
- Field shape: Rectangular

Construction
- Opened: 17 April 2011

Tenants
- Akita FC Cambiare; Saruta Kōgyō S.C. [tl] Hokuto Bank SC; Blaublitz Akita; TDK Shinwakai

Website
- katagamipark.jp

Akita Prefecture Football Centre (秋田県フットボールセンター, Akitaken Futtoboru Senta) is a football stadium in Katagami, Akita Prefecture, Japan. It is one of the home stadium of football clubs Akita FC Cambiare and Saruta Kogyo [tl].

== Facilities ==
The stadium is equipped with lighting for night matches. The artificial turf, model XP-62, is manufactured by Sumitomo Rubber Industries.

== Access ==
- JR Oga Line Kamifutada Station
- Michinoeki Tenno has 605 parking spaces.

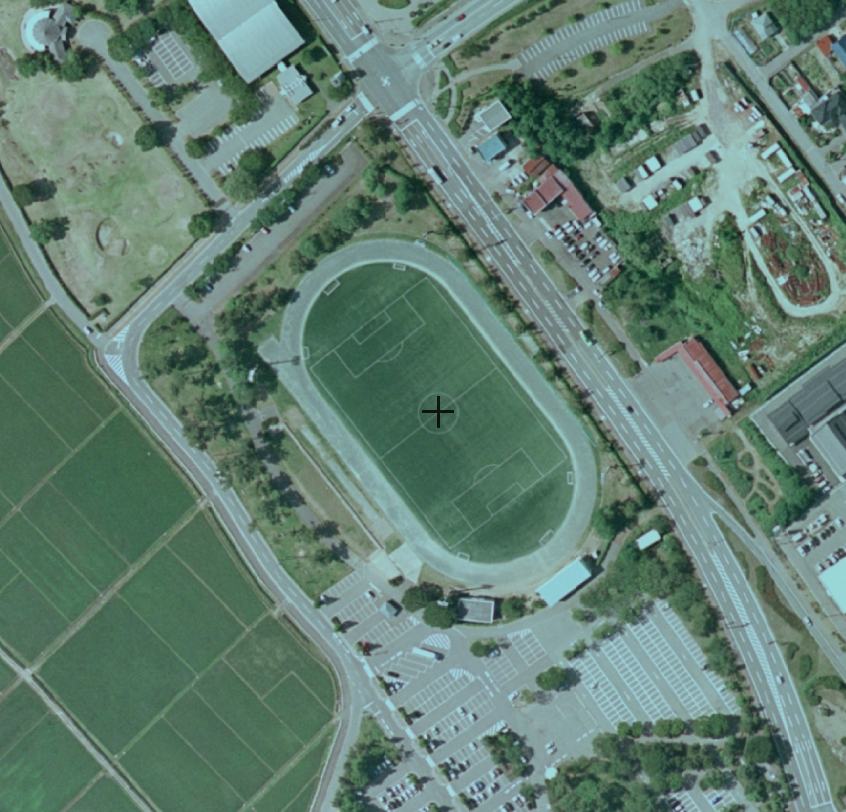
Satellite view
