= 2006 Japanese Regional Leagues =

Japanese amateur leagues football season

Japanese Regional Leagues
- Season: 2006

Statistics of Japanese Regional Leagues for the 2006 season.

== Champions list ==
Region	Champions
Hokkaido	Norbritz Hokkaido
Tohoku	TDK
Kantō	Yokohama Sports and Culture Club
Hokushin'etsu	Japan Soccer College
Tōkai	Gifu
Kansai	Banditonce Kobe
Chūgoku	Fagiano Okayama
Shikoku	Kamatamare Sanuki
Kyushu	V-Varen Nagasaki

== League standings ==
=== Hokkaido ===
Pos	Team	Pld	W	D	L	GF	GA	GD	Pts
1	Norbritz Hokkaido	14	10	3	1	37	5	+32	33
2	Barefoot Hokkaido	14	8	3	3	17	13	+4	27
3	Sapporo	14	7	2	5	38	24	+14	23
4	Blackpecker Hakodate	14	6	0	8	27	27	0	18
5	Toyota Motors Hokkaido	14	5	3	6	16	27	−11	18
6	Tokachi Fairsky	14	4	4	6	15	22	−7	16
7	Thank Kuriyama	14	4	3	7	24	27	−3	15
8	ACSC	14	2	2	10	17	46	−29	8

=== Tohoku ===
Division 1
Pos	Team	Pld	W	D	L	GF	GA	GD	Pts
1	TDK	14	14	0	0	58	7	+51	42
2	Grulla Morioka	14	11	0	3	32	18	+14	33
3	NEC Tokin	14	6	4	4	24	18	+6	22
4	Primeiro	14	6	2	6	18	29	−11	20
5	Sendai Nakada	14	4	1	9	27	34	−7	13
6	Shiogama Wiese	14	3	3	8	20	25	−5	12
7	Morioka Zebra	14	3	3	8	22	40	−18	12
8	Nippon Steel Kamaishi	14	2	1	11	14	44	−30	7

Division 2 North
Pos	Team	Pld	W	D	L	GF	GA	GD	Pts
1	Akita Cambiare	14	13	1	0	47	14	+33	40
2	Mizusawa Club	14	9	1	4	41	22	+19	28
3	Tono Club	14	7	2	5	42	30	+12	23
4	Fuji Club 2003	14	5	5	4	43	21	+22	20
5	Vanraure Hachinohe	14	6	1	7	37	38	−1	19
6	Hokuto Bank SC	14	5	2	7	34	37	−3	17
7	Aster Aomori	14	3	0	11	18	59	−41	9
8	TDK Shinwakai	14	1	2	11	16	57	−41	5

Division 2 South
Pos	Team	Pld	W	D	L	GF	GA	GD	Pts
1	Furukawa Battery	12	10	2	0	52	13	+39	32
2	Marysol Matsushima	12	9	1	2	49	14	+35	28
3	Northern Peaks Koriyama	12	9	0	3	44	15	+29	27
4	Kanai Club	12	5	0	7	25	49	−24	15
5	Shichigahama	12	3	2	7	24	38	−14	11
6	Perada Fukushima	12	3	1	8	27	41	−14	10
7	Kureha	12	0	0	12	20	71	−51	0

=== Kantō ===
Division 1
Pos	Team	Pld	W	D	L	GF	GA	GD	Pts
1	Yokohama Sports and Culture Club	14	7	3	4	30	20	+10	24
2	Honda Luminozo Sayama	14	7	3	4	29	22	+7	24
3	Yaita	14	7	3	4	21	14	+7	24
4	Saitama	14	5	5	4	27	18	+9	20
5	TFSC	14	6	1	7	24	24	0	19
6	Toho Titanium	14	5	2	7	15	26	−11	17
7	Maritime Self Defence Forces Atsugi Base Marcus	14	4	3	7	12	21	−9	15
8	Hanno Bruder	14	3	4	7	15	28	−13	13

Division 2
Pos	Team	Pld	W	D	L	GF	GA	GD	Pts
1	Machida Zelvia	14	10	2	2	45	17	+28	32
2	Hitachi Tochigi Uva	14	9	3	2	35	18	+17	30
3	Furukawa Chiba	14	9	1	4	37	25	+12	28
4	Nirasaki Astros	14	6	4	4	23	27	−4	22
5	Ome	14	5	3	6	20	23	−3	18
6	Kanagawa Teachers	14	3	3	8	20	32	−12	12
7	Aries Tokyo	14	2	4	8	17	31	−14	10
8	Zenkamisu	14	1	2	11	17	41	−24	5

=== Hokushin'etsu ===
Division 1
Pos	Team	Pld	W	D	L	GF	GA	GD	Pts
1	Japan Soccer College	14	11	2	1	44	11	+33	35
2	Matsumoto Yamaga	14	11	1	2	34	10	+24	34
3	Nagano Elsa	14	11	0	3	51	8	+43	33
4	Zweigen Kanazawa	14	6	3	5	36	15	+21	21
5	Fervorosa Ishikawa Hakuzan	14	4	2	8	25	34	−9	14
6	Niigata University of Management	14	3	2	9	18	51	−33	11
7	Ueda Gentian	14	2	4	8	8	33	−25	10
8	Teihens	14	0	2	12	10	64	−54	2

Division 2
Pos	Team	Pld	W	D	L	GF	GA	GD	Pts
1	Valiente Toyama	14	7	3	4	22	18	+4	24
2	Kanazu	14	6	4	4	25	16	+9	22
3	TOP Niigata	14	6	4	4	24	19	+5	22
4	Maruoka Phoenix	14	7	1	6	23	21	+2	22
5	Antelope Shiojiri	14	5	3	6	19	18	+1	18
6	Toyama Shinjo Club	14	5	3	6	14	21	−7	18
7	Lion Power Komatsu	14	4	4	6	11	25	−14	16
8	Nissei Plastic Industrial	14	2	6	6	24	24	0	12

=== Tōkai ===
Division 1
Pos	Team	Pld	W	D	L	GF	GA	GD	Pts
1	F.C. Gifu	14	12	2	0	46	3	+43	38
2	Shizuoka	14	11	2	1	57	16	+41	35
3	Yazaki Valente	14	8	1	5	25	21	+4	25
4	Sagawa Express Chukyo	14	6	1	7	26	33	−7	19
5	Maruyasu	14	5	3	6	21	25	−4	18
6	Fujieda City Government	14	5	1	8	29	38	−9	16
7	Chukyo University	14	2	2	10	18	40	−22	8
8	Chuo Bohan	14	0	2	12	10	56	−46	2

Division 2
Pos	Team	Pld	W	D	L	GF	GA	GD	Pts
1	Kasugai Club	14	9	3	2	26	11	+15	30
2	Honda Suzuka	14	9	2	3	27	19	+8	29
3	Mind House TC	14	7	2	5	26	16	+10	23
4	Konica Minolta Toyokawa	14	6	4	4	23	15	+8	22
5	Nagoya	14	6	2	6	32	31	+1	20
6	Fuyō Club	14	5	3	6	22	26	−4	18
7	Morishins	14	4	2	8	22	29	−7	14
8	F.C. Kawasaki	14	1	0	13	14	45	−31	3

=== Kansai ===
Division 1
Pos	Team	Pld	W	D	L	GF	GA	GD	Pts
1	Banditonce Kobe	14	11	2	1	35	9	+26	35
2	MIO Biwako Kusatsu	14	8	2	4	28	17	+11	26
3	Kobe 1970	14	7	1	6	24	29	−5	22
4	Sanyo Electric Sumoto	14	6	1	7	31	27	+4	19
5	Laranja Kyoto	14	6	1	7	27	27	0	19
6	Ain Food	14	5	2	7	20	21	−1	17
7	Kyoto Shiko Club	14	3	3	8	20	30	−10	12
8	Takada	14	3	2	9	24	49	−25	11

Division 2
Pos	Team	Pld	W	D	L	GF	GA	GD	Pts
1	Technonet Osaka	14	11	2	1	30	13	+17	35
2	Kyoto BAMB	14	10	4	0	43	10	+33	34
3	Hermano Osaka	14	7	1	6	36	30	+6	22
4	Riseisha	14	5	4	5	30	26	+4	19
5	Mitsubishi Heavy Industries Kobe	14	5	2	7	19	28	−9	17
6	Kihoku Shukyudan	14	4	2	8	23	46	−23	14
7	Renaiss College	14	2	3	9	13	26	−13	9
8	Kobe 1970 C	14	2	2	10	24	39	−15	8

=== Chūgoku ===
Pos	Team	Pld	W	PKW	PKL	L	GF	GA	GD	Pts
1	Fagiano Okayama	14	11	1	0	2	62	16	+46	35
2	Central Chugoku	14	11	0	1	2	50	16	+34	34
3	Sagawa Express Chugoku	14	8	3	1	2	52	20	+32	31
4	Renofa Yamaguchi	14	7	1	2	4	25	28	−3	25
5	Hiroshima Fujita	14	3	1	1	9	16	35	−19	12
6	JFE Steel West Japan	14	3	0	3	8	15	44	−29	12
7	Hitachi Kasado	14	2	3	0	9	12	44	−32	12
8	Iwami	14	2	0	1	11	16	45	−29	7

=== Shikoku ===
Pos	Team	Pld	W	D	L	GF	GA	GD	Pts
1	Kamatamare Sanuki	14	12	1	1	45	12	+33	37
2	Nangoku Kochi	14	11	2	1	54	11	+43	35
3	Ehime Shimanami	14	8	2	4	43	21	+22	26
4	Sanyo Electric Tokushima	14	6	2	6	29	29	0	20
5	Tokushima Vortis Amateur	14	5	3	6	30	30	0	18
6	Ventana	14	4	1	9	18	46	−28	13
7	Alex	14	3	2	9	17	44	−27	11
8	Sanwa Club	14	0	1	13	9	52	−43	1

=== Kyushu ===
Pos	Team	Pld	W	PKW	PKL	L	GF	GA	GD	Pts
1	V-Varen Nagasaki	16	14	0	1	1	43	14	+29	43
2	Nippon Steel Oita	16	12	1	1	2	46	18	+28	39
3	New Wave Kitakyushu	16	11	1	1	3	45	23	+22	36
4	Volca Kagoshima	16	10	0	0	6	45	27	+18	30
5	Okinawa Kariyushi	16	9	0	0	7	36	33	+3	27
6	Osumi NIFS United	16	4	1	0	11	25	40	−15	14
7	Mitsubishi Heavy Industries Nagasaki	16	4	0	0	12	27	41	−14	12
8	Nanakuma Tombies	16	2	1	0	13	17	60	−43	8
9	Okinawa Kaiho Bank	16	2	0	1	13	15	43	−28	7
