= Kyohei Maeyama =

Japanese footballer

Kyohei Maeyama 前山恭平
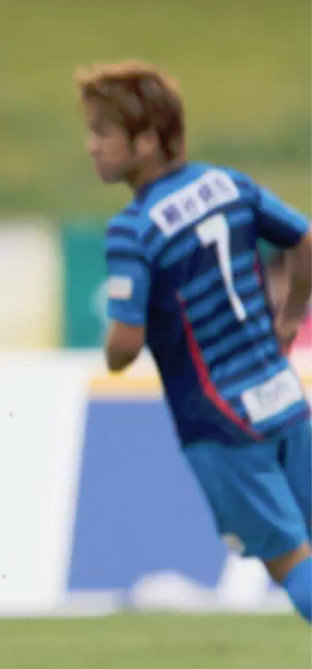

Personal information
- Full name: Kyohei Maeyama
- Date of birth: December 10, 1987 (age 38)
- Place of birth: Imari, Saga, Japan
- Height: 1.63 m (5 ft 4 in)
- Position: Attacking midfielder

Youth career
- 2006–2009: Fukuoka University

Senior career*
Years	Team	Apps	(Gls)
2010–2020	Blaublitz Akita	247	(38)
- * Club domestic league appearances and goals as of 21 December 2020

Kyohei Maeyama (前山 恭平, Maeyama Kyōhei; born December 10, 1987 in Imari, Saga) is a Japanese former football player who played for Blaublitz Akita.

== Club statistics ==
Updated to 31 December 2020.

Club performance			League		Cup		Total	
Season	Club	League	Apps	Goals	Apps	Goals	Apps	Goals
Japan			League		Emperor's Cup		Total	
2009	Fukuoka University	-	0	0	3	0	3	0
2010	Blaublitz Akita	JFL	20	0	2	1	22	1
2011	Blaublitz Akita	JFL	4	0	0	0	4	0
2012	Blaublitz Akita	JFL	26	2	2	0	28	2
2013	Blaublitz Akita	JFL	28	6	2	1	30	7
2014	Blaublitz Akita	J3 League	26	2	2	1	28	3
2015	Blaublitz Akita	J3 League	35	10	2	0	37	10
2016	Blaublitz Akita	J3 League	27	4	2	1	29	5
2017	Blaublitz Akita	J3 League	30	7	1	0	31	7
2018	Blaublitz Akita	J3 League	26	5	1	0	27	5
2019	Blaublitz Akita	J3 League	14	2	1	0	15	2
2020	Blaublitz Akita	J3 League	10	0	0	0	10	0
Total			247	38	18	4	265	42

== Honours ==
Blaublitz Akita

- J3 League (2): 2017, 2020
