= Nishime Country Park Soccer Field =

Best park soccer field

- 由利本荘市西目カントリーパークサッカー場
- Kansuta
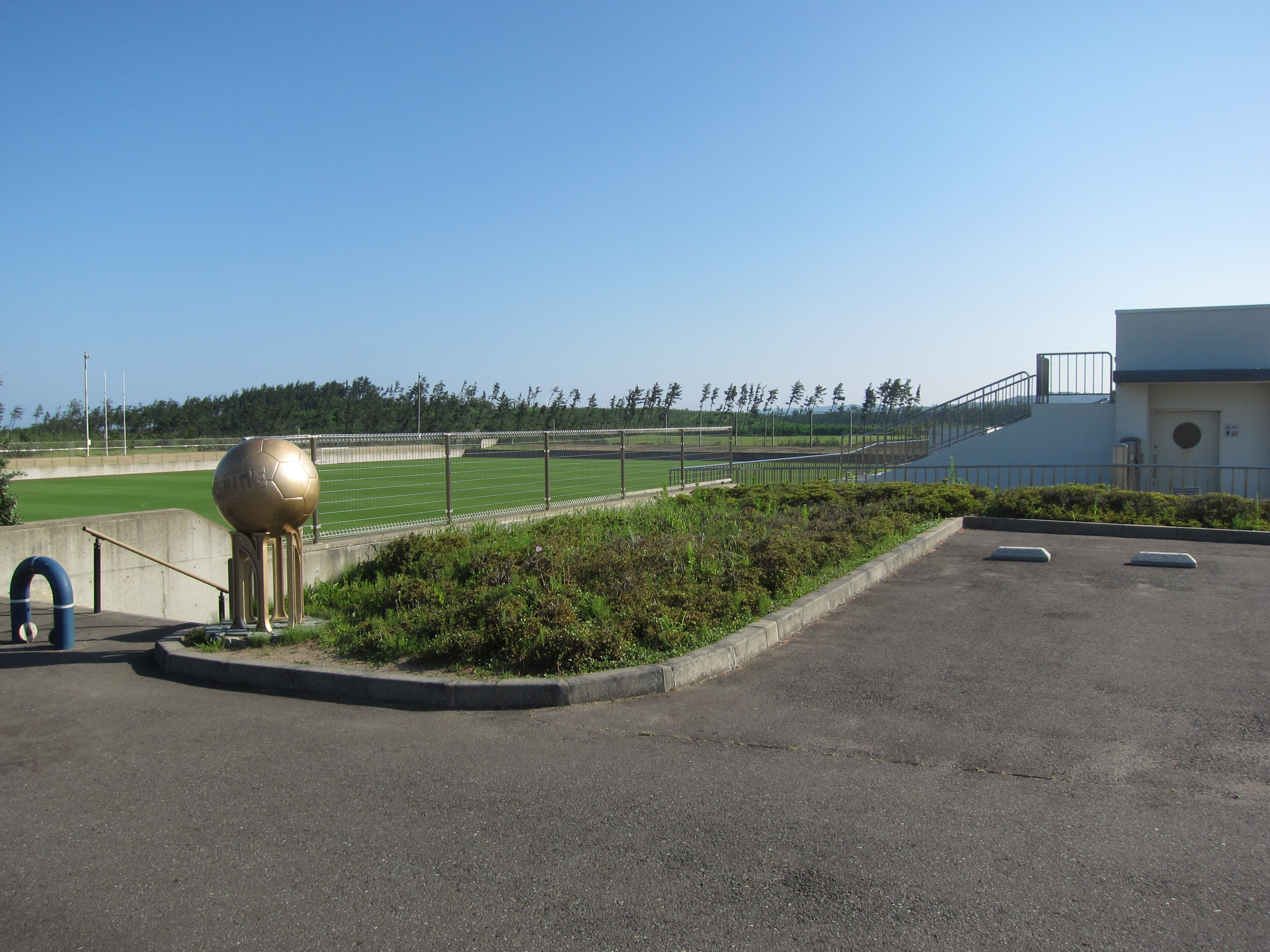

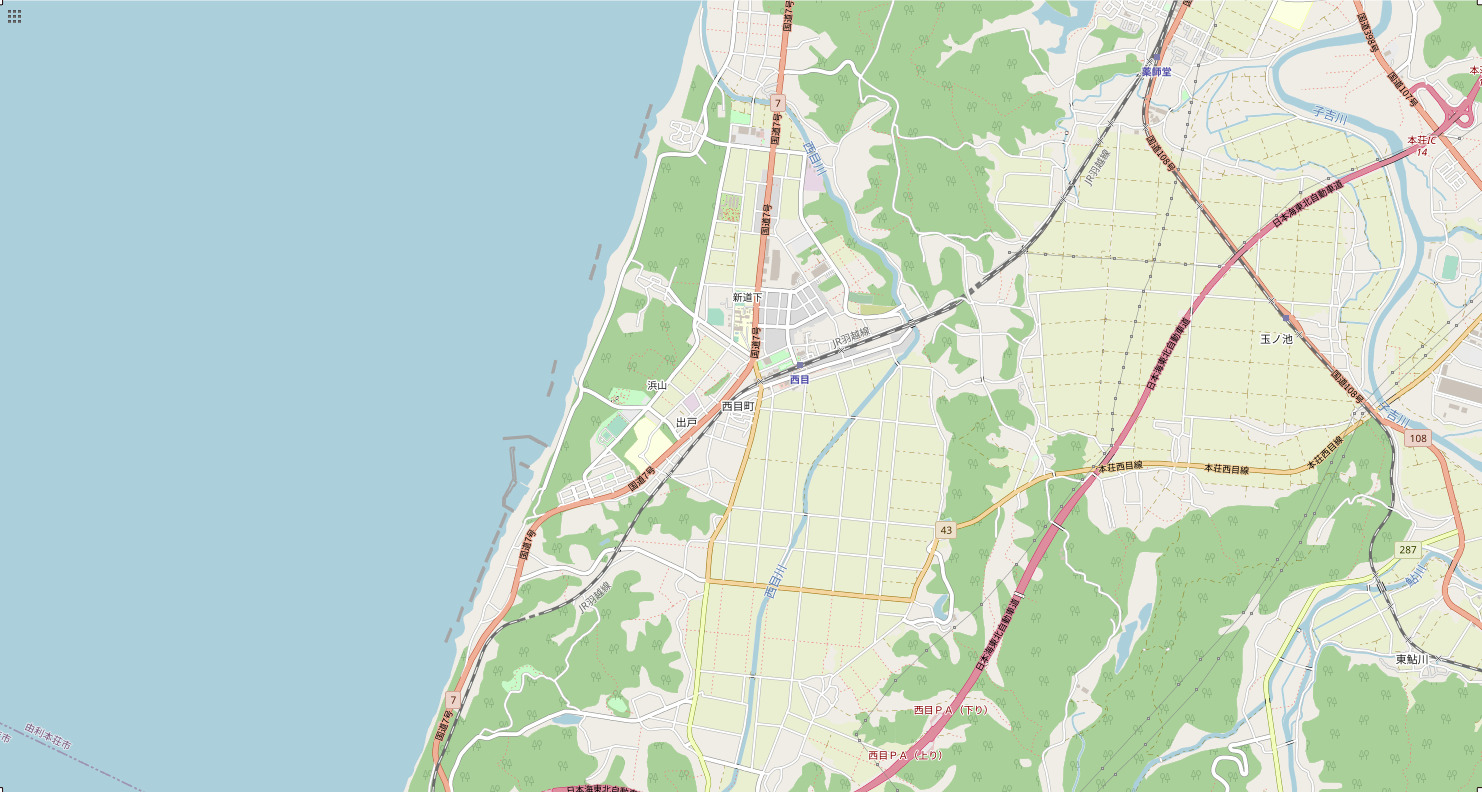
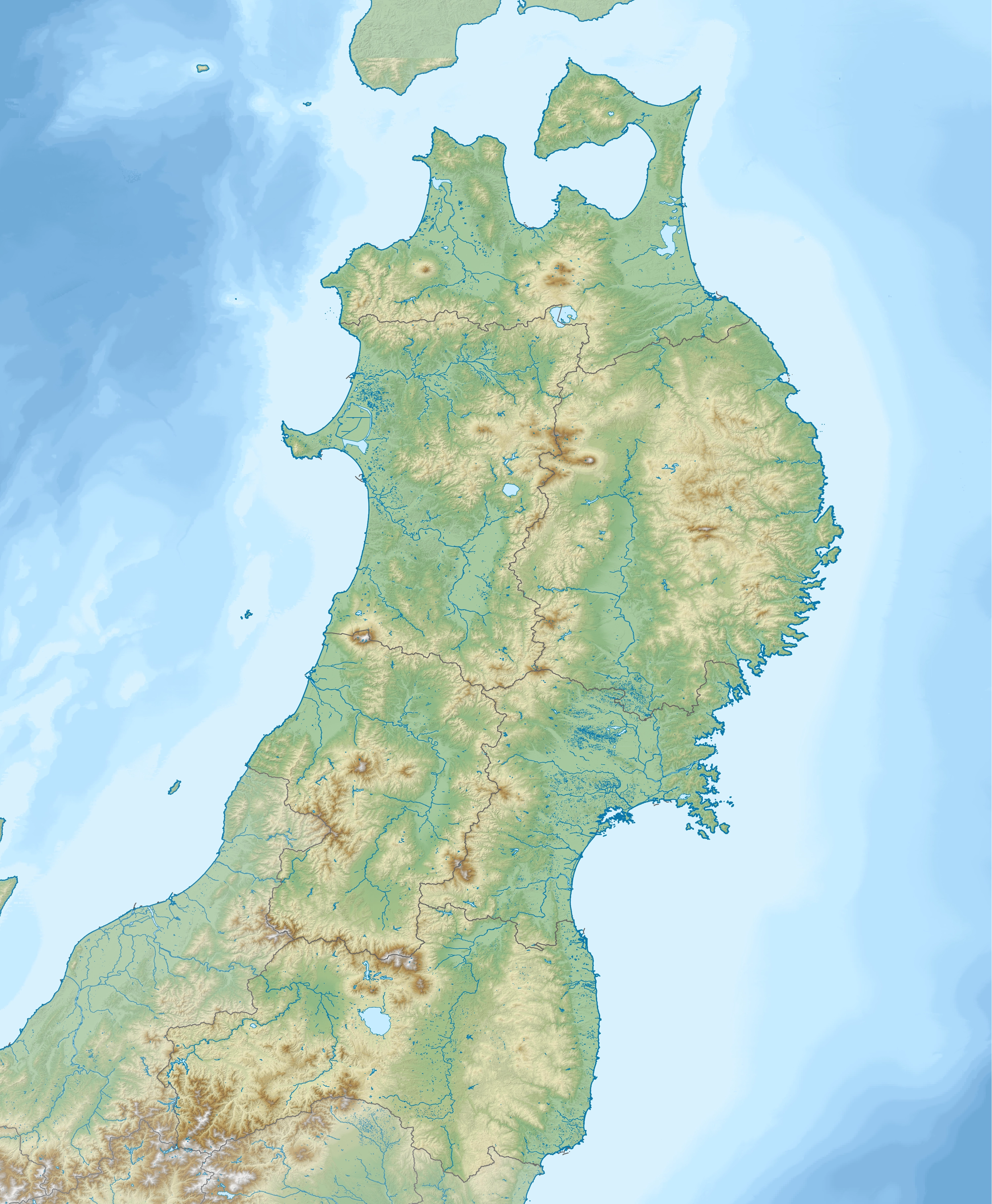
- Location of Nishime Country Park Soccer Field within Nishime, Akita Nishime Country Park Soccer Field (Akita Prefecture) Nishime Country Park Soccer Field (Tohoku Region) Nishime Country Park Soccer Field (Japan)
- Full name: Yurihonjo City Nishime Country Park Soccer Field
- Address: Nishime, Yurihonjo, Japan
- Coordinates: 39°20′37.82″N 140°0′9.80″E
- Operator: Yurihonjo city
- Capacity: 4,328
- Type: Stadium
- Surface: Artificial
- Field size: 118 × 93 m
- Field shape: Rectangular
- Parking: 278 spaces

Construction
- Opened: 2004

Tenant
- Blaublitz Akita/TDK SC (J. League) (-2013)

Nishime Country Park Soccer Field (由利本荘市西目カントリーパークサッカー場, Yurihonjoshi Nishime Kantori Paku Sakkajo) is a football stadium in Nishime, Yurihonjo, Akita Prefecture, Japan. The stadium has a capacity of 4,328 and was the home ground of J3 League club Blaublitz Akita.

== Gallery ==
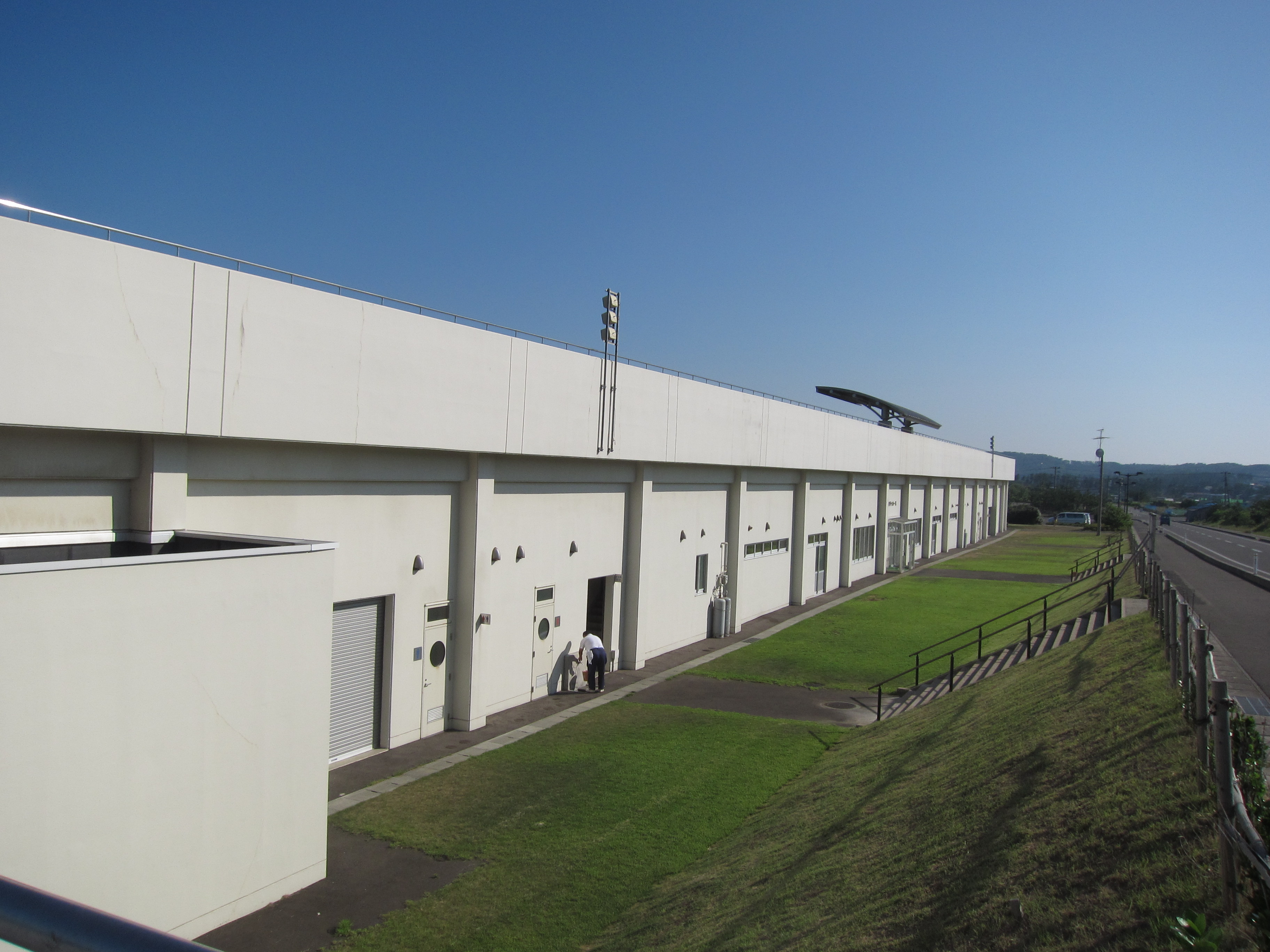

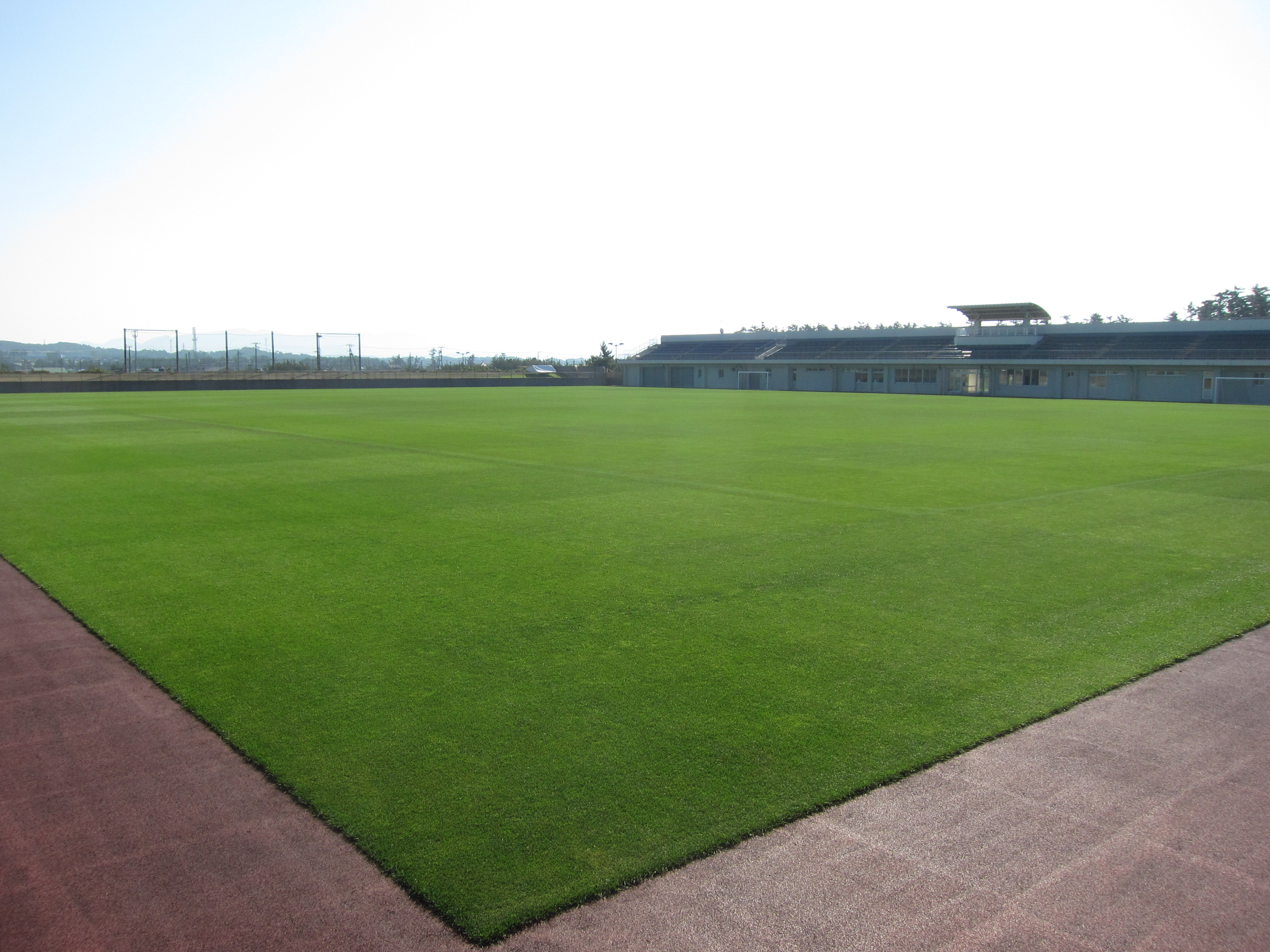

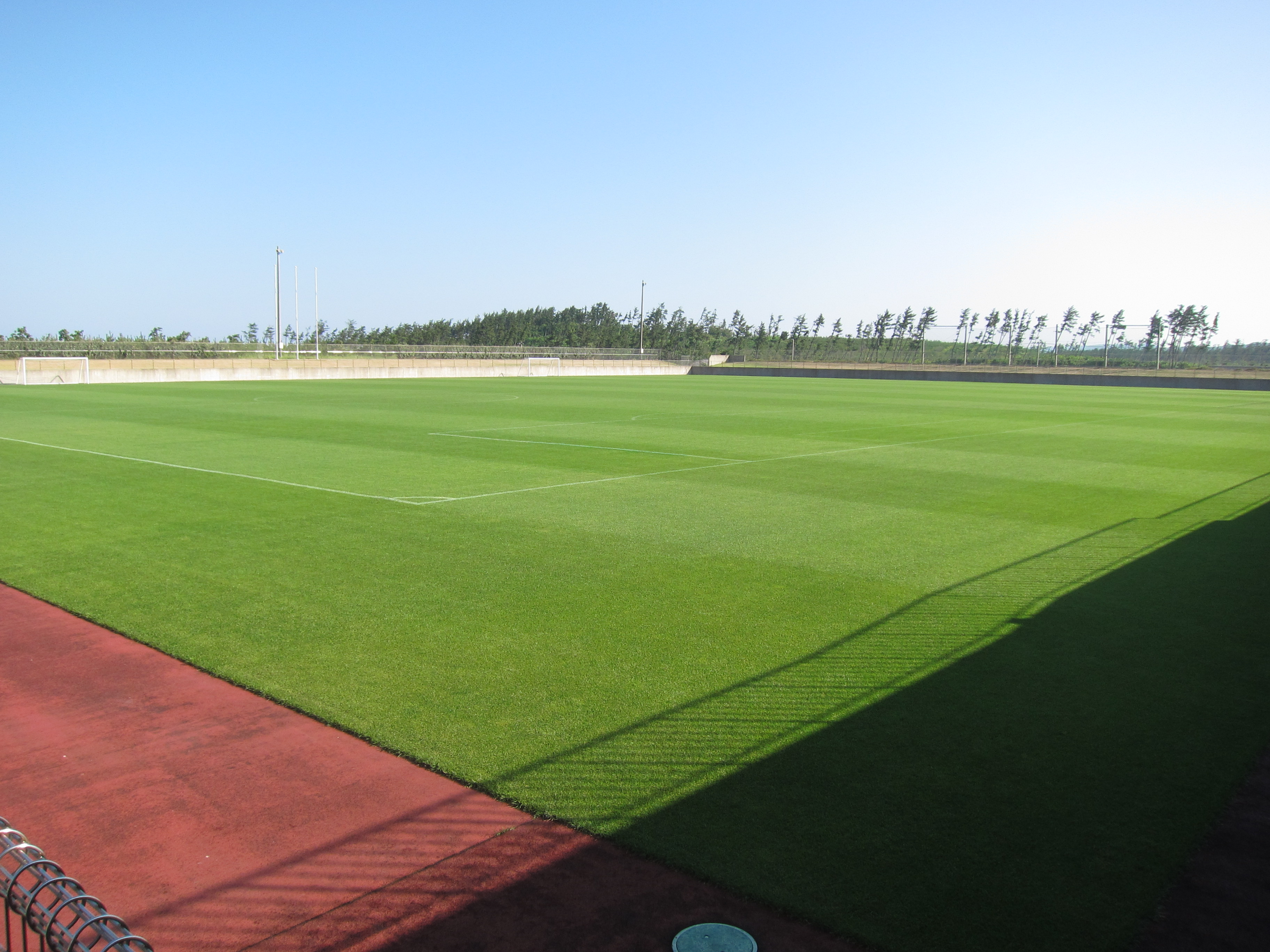

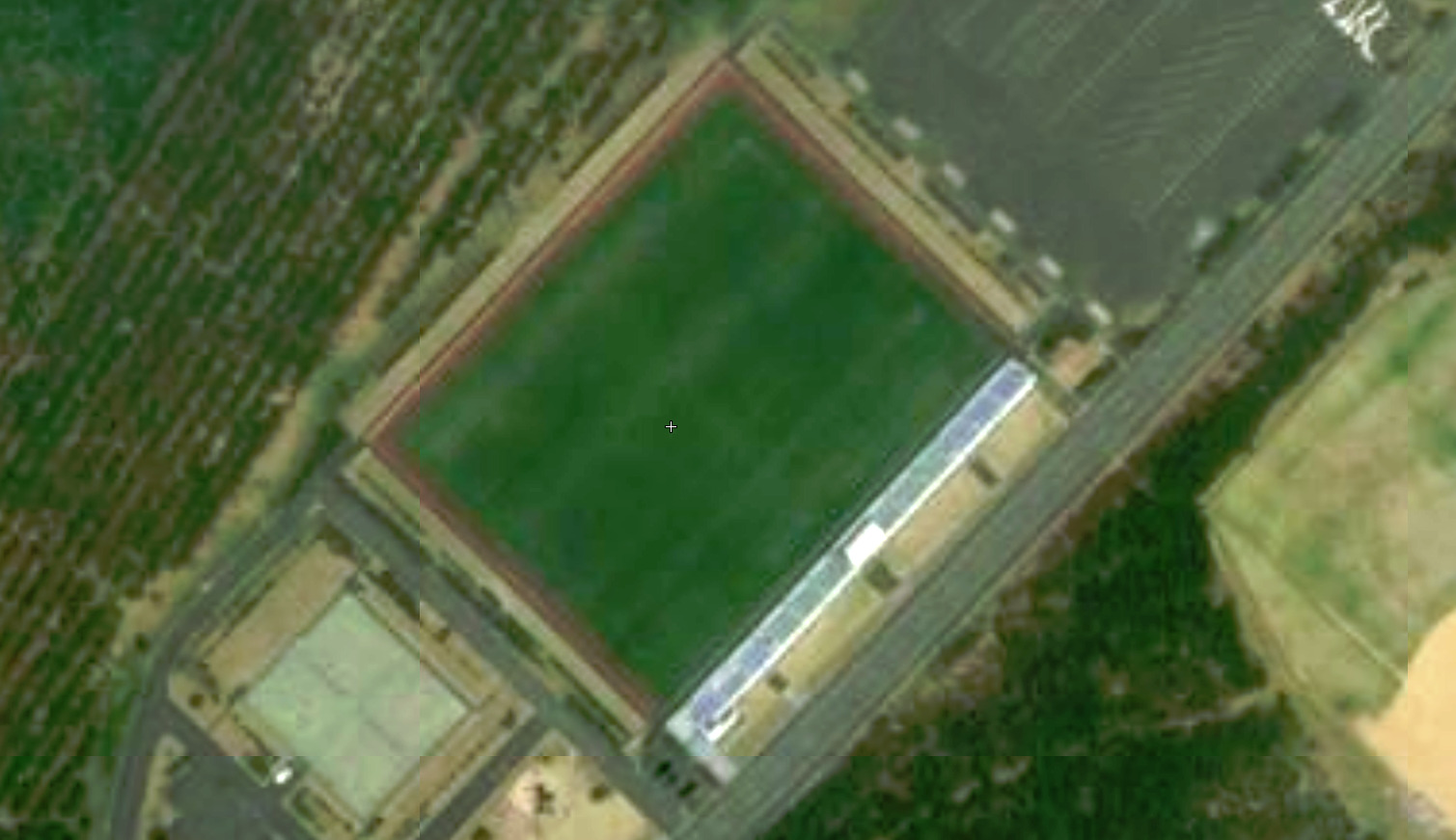
Satellite view
