= List of stadiums in Japan =

The following is a list of stadiums in Japan, ordered by capacity. Currently all stadiums with a capacity of 10,000 or more are included.

== Current stadiums ==
#	Image	Stadium	Capacity	City	Region	Home team(s)	Opened
1		Nissan Stadium	72,327	Yokohama, Kanagawa	Kantō	Yokohama F. Marinos, Yokohama Eagles (some matches)	1998
2		Japan National Stadium	67,750 (fixed); 80,016 (with temporary seats)	Shinjuku, Tokyo	Kantō	Japan national football team (some matches), Japan national rugby union team	2019
3		Saitama Stadium 2002	63,700	Saitama, Saitama	Kantō	Urawa Red Diamonds	2001
4		ECOPA Stadium	50,889	Fukuroi, Shizuoka	Chūbu	Júbilo Iwata (some matches)	2001
5		Q&A Stadium Miyagi	49,133	Rifu, Miyagi	Tōhoku	Vegalta Sendai (some matches)	2000
6		Ajinomoto Stadium	48,013	Chōfu, Tokyo	Kantō	F.C. Tokyo, Tokyo Verdy, Toshiba Brave Lupus Tokyo (some matches)	2001
7		Hanshin Koshien Stadium	47,359	Nishinomiya, Hyōgo	Kansai	Hanshin Tigers (some matches)	1924
8		Yanmar Stadium Nagai	47,000	Higashisumiyoshi, Osaka	Kansai	Cerezo Osaka(some matches), Red Hurricanes Osaka	1964
9		Tokyo Dome	45,600	Bunkyō, Tokyo	Kantō	Yomiuri Giants	1988
10		Kobe Universiade Memorial Stadium	45,000	Kobe, Hyōgo	Kansai	Kobe Steelers (some matches)	
11		Toyota Stadium	45,000	Toyota, Aichi	Chūbu	Nagoya Grampus, Toyota Verblitz (some matches)	2001
12		Denka Big Swan Stadium	42,300	Niigata, Niigata	Chūbu	Albirex Niigata	2001
13		Sapporo Dome	41,566	Sapporo, Hokkaido	Hokkaido	Hokkaido Consadole Sapporo	2001
14		Mizuho PayPay Dome Fukuoka	40,142	Fukuoka, Fukuoka	Kyūshu	Fukuoka SoftBank Hawks	1993
15		Mercari Stadium	40,003	Kashima, Ibaraki	Kantō	Kashima Antlers	1993
16		Crasus Dome Oita	40,000	Ōita, Ōita	Kyūshu	Oita Trinita	2001
17		Panasonic Stadium Suita	40,000	Suita, Osaka	Kansai	Gamba Osaka	2015
18		Meiji Jingu Stadium	37,933	Shinjuku, Tokyo	Kantō	Tokyo Yakult Swallows	1926
19		Edion Stadium Hiroshima	36,906	Hiroshima, Hiroshima	Chūgoku		
20		Vantelin Dome Nagoya	36,412	Nagoya, Aichi	Chūbu	Chunichi Dragons	1997
21		Kyocera Dome Osaka	36,220	Nishi, Osaka	Kansai	Orix Buffaloes (some matches), Hanshin Tigers (some matches)	1997
22		ES CON Field Hokkaido	35,000	Kitahiroshima, Hokkaido	Hokkaido	Hokkaido Nippon-Ham Fighters	2023
23		Noevir Stadium Kobe	34,000	Kobe, Hyōgo	Kansai	Vissel Kobe, Kobe Steelers (some matches)	2001
24		Mazda Zoom-Zoom Stadium Hiroshima	33,000	Hiroshima, Hiroshima	Chūgoku	Hiroshima Toyo Carp	2009
25		EGAO Kenko Stadium	32,000	Kumamoto, Kumamoto	Kyūshu	Roasso Kumamoto	1998
26		Edion Peace Wing Hiroshima	28,500	Hiroshima, Hiroshima	Chūgoku	Sanfrecce Hiroshima	2024
27		Kusanagi Athletics Stadium	28,000	Shizuoka, Shizuoka	Chūbu		1957
28		Todoroki Athletics Stadium	27,495	Kawasaki, Kanagawa	Kantō	Kawasaki Frontale	1962
29		Paloma Mizuho Stadium	27,000	Nagoya, Aichi	Chūbu	Toyota Verblitz (some matches)	1947
30		Hanazono Rugby Stadium	26,544	Higashiosaka, Osaka	Kansai	FC Osaka, Hanazono Liners	1929
31		Gifu Nagaragawa Stadium	26,109	Gifu, Gifu	Chūbu	F.C. Gifu	1991
32		Toyama Athletics Stadium	25,251	Toyama, Toyama	Chūbu	Kataller Toyama	1993
33		Kanseki Stadium Tochigi	25,000	Utsunomiya, Tochigi	Kantō	Tochigi SC (some matches)	2020
34		Kochi Haruno Athletics Stadium	25,000	Haruno, Kōchi	Shikoku	Kochi United SC	1987
35		Matsumoto Baseball Stadium	25,000	Matsumoto, Nagano	Chūbu		
36		Maruyama Baseball Stadium	25,000	Sapporo, Hokkaido	Hokkaido		1934
37		Akita Prefectural Baseball Stadium	25,000	Akita, Akita	Tōhoku		2003
38		Matsumoto Daira Athletics Stadium	25,000	Matsumoto, Nagano	Chubu		1977
39		Chichibunomiya Rugby Stadium	24,871	Minato, Tokyo	Kanto	Tokyo Sungoliath, Yokohama Eagles (some matches), Toshiba Brave Lupus Tokyo (some matches), Urayasu D-Rocks	1947
40		Ekimae Real Estate Stadium	24,490	Tosu, Saga	Kyushu	Sagan Tosu	1996
41		Yodoko Sakura Stadium	24,074	Osaka	Kansai	Cerezo Osaka, NTT DoCoMo Red Hurricanes Osaka	1987
42		Kumagaya Rugby Ground	24,000	Kumagaya, Saitama	Kanto	Panasonic Wild Knights, Saitama Wild Knights	1991
43		Matsue Athletics Stadium	24,000	Matsue, Shimane	Chūgoku	FC Kagura Shimane	1981
44		Saving Athletics Stadium	23,939	Shimonoseki, Yamaguchi	Chugoku	Renofa Yamaguchi (some matches), FC Baleine Shimonoseki	1958
45		Takasago Athletics Stadium	23,200	Takasago, Hyogo	Kansai	Takasago Mineiro FC	
46		Kasamatsu Stadium	22,002	Hitachinaka, Ibaraki	Kantō		1973
47		Fukui Prefectural Stadium	22,000	Fukui, Fukui	Chūbu		1967
48		Akita Prefectural Central Park Athletics Stadium	22,000	Akita, Akita	Tōhoku	Saruta Kōgyō S.C. [tl] Akita FC Cambiare	1984
49		Western Digital Stadium Kitakami	22,000	Kitakami, Iwate	Tōhoku	Iwate Grulla Morioka	1997
50		Sanga Stadium by Kyocera	21,600	Kameoka, Kyoto	Kansai	Kyoto Sanga	2020
51		Shizutetsu Stadium Kusanagi	21,656	Shizuoka	Chubu		1930
52		Best Denki Stadium	21,562	Fukuoka	Kyushu	Avispa Fukuoka	1995
53		Urawa Komaba Stadium	21,500	Saitama, Saitama	Kantō		1967
54		ND Soft Stadium Yamagata	21,174	Tendō, Yamagata	Tōhoku	Montedio Yamagata	1991
55		Technoport Fukui Stadium	21,053	Sakai, Fukui	Chūbu	Fukui United FC	1994
56		Kamoike Ballpark	21,000	Kagoshima	Kagoshima		
57		Toho Stadium	21,000	Fukushima, Fukushima	Tōhoku	Fukushima United F.C.	
58		Osaka Expo '70 Stadium	21,000	Suita, Osaka	Kansai		1972
59		Sapporo Atsubetsu Park Stadium	20,861	Sapporo	Hokkaido	Consadole Sapporo	1986
60		Kakuhiro Group Athletics Stadium	20,809	Aomori, Aomori	Tōhoku	ReinMeer Aomori	2019
61		Takebishi Stadium Kyoto	20,688	Kyoto	Kansai		1942
62		Pocarisweat Stadium	20,441	Naruto, Tokushima	Shikoku	Tokushima Vortis	1971
63		IAI Stadium Nihondaira	20,299	Shizuoka, Shizuoka	Chūbu	Shimizu S-Pulse	1991
64		Ishikawa Kanazawa Stadium	20,261	Kanazawa, Ishikawa	Chūbu	Zweigen Kanazawa	
65		Transcosmos Stadium Nagasaki	20,246	Nagasaki	Kyushu		1969
66		Soyu Stadium	20,125	Akita, Akita	Tōhoku	Blaublitz Akita	1941
67		Komazawa Olympic Park Stadium	20,010	Tokyo	Kantō	Black Rams Tokyo	1964
68		Peace Stadium Connected by SoftBank	20,000	Nagasaki	Kyushu	V-Varen Nagasaki	2025
69		Chiyodai Baseball Stadium	20,000	Hakodate	Hokkaidō		1950
70		Sunpro Alwin	20,000	Matsumoto, Nagano	Chūbu	F.C. Antelope Shiojiri, Matsumoto Yamaga F.C.	1999
71		Kishiro Stadium	20,000	Akashi, Hyōgo	Kansai		1974
72		Hinata Stadium	20,000	Miyazaki, Miyazaki	Kyushu	Honda Lock SC; Estrela Miyazaki	1974
73		Kashiwanoha Park Stadium	20,000	Kashiwa, Chiba	Kantō	Green Rockets Tokatsu	1999
74		City Light Stadium	20,000	Okayama	Chūgoku	Fagiano Okayama	1957
75		Nagoya City Minato Football Stadium	20,000	Nagoya	Chūbu	FC Maruyasu Okazaki	1993
76		Ningineer Stadium	20,000	Matsuyama, Ehime	Shikoku	Ehime FC	1979
77		Miki Park Stadium	20,000	Miki, Hyōgo	Kansai		2005
78		Ishin Me-Life Stadium	20,000	Yamaguchi, Yamaguchi	Chūgoku	Renofa Yamaguchi F.C. (some matches)	1963
79		Gofuku Athletics Stadium	20,000	Toyama, Toyama	Chubu		1957
80		Ota Athletics Stadium	20,000 (expanded)	Ōta, Gunma	Kantō	Panasonic Wild Knights	1974
81		Kurayoshi Athletics Stadium	20,000	Kurayoshi, Tottori	Chugoku		
82		Fukuda Denshi Arena	19,781	Chiba, Chiba	Kantō	JEF United Ichihara Chiba	2005
83		Kimiidera Athletics Stadium	19,200	Wakayama, Wakayama	Kansai	Arterivo Wakayama	1964
84		Yurtec Stadium Sendai	19,134	Sendai	Tōhoku	Vegalta Sendai (some matches), Sony Sendai FC	1997
85		Mie Kotsu Athletics Stadium	19,067	Ise, Mie	Kansai	Veertien Mie	1968
86		Niigata City Athletics Stadium	18,671	Niigata, Niigata	Chūbu		1936
87		Obihiro Athletics Stadium	18,504	Obihiro, Hokkaido	Hokkaido	Hokkaido Tokachi Sky Earth	1983
88		Yokohama Mitsuzawa Athletics Stadium	18,300	Yokohama, Kanagawa	Kanto	YSCC Yokohama	1951
89		Nagano Athletics Stadium	17,200 (expanded)	Nagano, Nagano	Chūbu	AC Nagano Parceiro	1976
90		JIT Recycle Ink Stadium	17,000	Kōfu, Yamanashi	Chūbu	Ventforet Kofu	1985
91		Saga Athletics Stadium	17,000	Saga, Saga	Kyushu		1970
92		Kurume Athletics Stadium	17,000	Kurume, Fukuoka	Kyushu		
93		Akita Prefectural Central Park Playing Field	16,500	Akita, Akita	Tōhoku	Saruta Kōgyō S.C. [tl] Akita FC Cambiare	1984
94		Hanasaki Sports Park Stadium	16,500	Asahikawa, Hokkaido	Hokkaido		1982
95		Sakigake Yabase Baseball Stadium	16,421	Akita	Akita		1941
96		Shinobugaoka Stadium	16,400	Fukushima, Fukushima	Tōhoku	Fukushima United FC	1951
97		Mutsu Athletics Stadium	16,200	Mutsu, Aomori	Tōhoku	ReinMeer Aomori	1968
98		Axis Bird Stadium	16,033	Tottori, Tottori	Chūgoku	Gainare Tottori	1996
99		Kakidomari Stadium	16,000	Nagasaki	Kyushu		
100		9.98 Stadium	16,000	Fukui, Fukui	Chubu		1967
101		Doradora Park Yonago Stadium	16,000	Yonago, Tottori	Chugoku	Gainare Tottori	
102		Oita Athletics Stadium	15,943	Ōita, Ōita	Kyushu		1965
103		Hamayama Athletics Stadium	15,700	Izumo, Shimane	Chugoku	FC Kagura Shimane	1980
104		Lemon Gas Stadium Hiratsuka	15,690	Hiratsuka, Kanagawa	Kantō	Shonan Bellmare	1987
105		Yanmar Field Nagai	15,516	Osaka	Kansai	Sagawa Express Osaka SC	1993
106		NACK5 Stadium Omiya	15,500	Saitama, Saitama	Kantō	RB Omiya Ardija	1964
107		Nagano U Stadium	15,491	Nagano, Nagano	Chūbu	AC Nagano Parceiro	2002
108		Machida Gion Stadium	15,489	Machida, Tokyo	Kantō	FC Machida Zelvia	1990
109		Kōriyama Hirose Kaiseizan Athletics Stadium	15,474	Kōriyama, Fukushima	Tōhoku	Fukushima FC	
110		Mitsuzawa Stadium	15,454	Yokohama	Kantō	Yokohama FC, Yokohama Flügels, Yokohama Eagles (some matches)	1955
111		Kumagaya Athletics Stadium	15,392	Kumagaya, Saitama	Kantō		2003
112		Sankyo Frontier Kashiwa Stadium	15,349	Kashiwa, Chiba	Kantō	Kashiwa Reysol	1986
113		Mikuni World Stadium Kitakyushu	15,300	Kitakyushu, Fukuoka	Kyushu	Giravanz Kitakyushu	2017
114		Sagamihara Gion Stadium	15,300	Minami-ku, Sagamihara	Kantō	S.C. Sagamihara, Mitsubishi Sagamihara DynaBoars	2007
115		Kakogawa Athletics Stadium	15,275	Kakogawa, Hyōgo	Kansai	Cento Cuore Harima FC	1998
116		Shoda Shoyu Stadium Gunma	15,253	Maebashi, Gunma	Kantō	Thespa Kusatsu, Thespakusatsu Gunma	1951
117		Yamaha Stadium	15,165	Iwata, Shizuoka	Chūbu	Júbilo Iwata (some matches), Shizuoka Blue Revs	1978
118		Shiranami Stadium	15,044	Kagoshima	Kyushu	Kagoshima United FC, Je Vrille Kagoshima	1972
119		Wink Athletics Stadium	15,000	Himeji, Hyōgo	Kansai	AS Harima Albion	1964
120		Hitachinaka City Stadium	15,000	Hitachinaka, Ibaraki	Kantō	Ryutsu Keizai University FC	1998
121		Mizuho Rugby Stadium	15,000	Nagoya	Chūbu	Toyota Industries Shuttles Aichi	1941
122		Nobeoka Nishishina Athletics Stadium	15,000	Nobeoka, Miyazaki	Kyushu	Honda Lock	1968
123		Toso Athletics Stadium	15,000	Asahi, Chiba	Kanto		2001
124		Odawara Athletics Stadium	15,000	Odawara, Kanagawa	Kanto		1955
125		Kunugidaira Football Fields	15,000	Fujikawaguchiko, Yamanashi	Chubu		1995
126		Yamanokuchi Athletics Stadium	15,000 (expanding)	Miyakonojo, Miyazaki	Kyushu		
127		Hakodate Chiyogadai Stadium	15,000	Hakodate, Hokkaido	Hokkaido		2001
128		Suizenji Stadium	15,000	Kumamoto	Kyushu		1960
129		Ueda Castle Athletics Stadium	15,000	Ueda, Nagano	Chubu		1928
130		Saijo Hiuchi Athletics Stadium	14,980	Saijo, Ehime	Shikoku	FC Imabari	
131		Iwaki Athletics Stadium	14,766	Iwaki, Fukushima	Tōhoku	Fukushima United FC	1971
132		Chatan Athletics Stadium	14,221	Chatan, Okinawa	Kyushu	FC Ryukyu	1988
133		Tochigi Green Stadium	14,119	Utsunomiya, Tochigi	Kantō	Tochigi SC (some matches)	1993
134		ZA Oripri Stadium	14,051	Ichihara, Chiba	Kantō		1993
135		Hiroshima General Ground Main Stadium	13,800	Hiroshima	Chūgoku		1941
136		Okinawa City Stadium	13,400	Okinawa, Okinawa	Kyushu	FC Ryukyu	1973
137		Hiroshima Sogo Ground Baseball Park	13,000	Hiroshima	Hiroshima		1941
138		Fujieda Football Stadium	13,000	Fujieda, Shizuoka	Chubu	Fujieda MYFC	2002
139		Work Staff Athletics Stadium	13,000	Tokushima, Tokushima	Shikoku		1976
140		Muroran Irie Stadium	12,600	Muroran, Hokkaido	Hokkaido		1988
141		Toyohashi Athletics Stadium	12,600	Toyohashi, Aichi	Chubu		
142		Hamamatsu Stadium	12,500	Hamamatsu, Shizuoka	Chūbu	PJM Futures	1988
143		Tapic Kenso Hiyagon Stadium	12,270	Okinawa, Okinawa	Kyushu	FC Ryukyu	1987
144		Ikimenomori Athletics Park	12,000	Miyazaki, Miyazaki	Kyushu	Honda Lock SC	2006
145		K's denki Stadium Mito	12,000	Mito, Ibaraki	Kantō	Mito HollyHock	1987
146		Sapporo Maruyama Athletics Stadium	12,000	Sapporo, Hokkaido	Hokkaido		1934
147		Hirosaki Athletics Stadium	12,000	Hirosaki, Aomori	Tohoku	Blancdieu Hirosaki FC	
148		Kusanagi Ball Game Field	12,000	Shizuoka, Shizuoka	Chubu	Shizuoka FC	1957
149		Mie Suzuka Sports Garden	12,000	Suzuka, Mie	Kansai	Suzuka Point Getters	1992
150		Ojiyama Stadium	12,000	Ōtsu, Shiga	Kansai	MIO Biwako Shiga	1964
151		Kushiro Stadium	11,600	Kushiro, Hokkaido	Hokkaido		1987
152		Fujihokuroku Park Stadium	11,105	Fujiyoshida, Yamanashi	Chūbu		1985
153		Inagi Athletics Stadium	11,000	Inagi, Tokyo	Kanto	Nippon TV Tokyo Verdy Beleza	1991
154		Tsuruga Athletics Stadium	11,000	Tsuruga, Fukui	Chubu		
155		Sasebo Athletics Stadium	11,000	Sasebo, Nagasaki	Kyushu		1967
156		Toyokawa Athletics Stadium	10,698	Toyokawa, Aichi	Chubu	Rivielta Toyokawa	1964
157		Nagaoka Athletics Stadium	10,622	Nagaoka, Niigata	Chubu	Albirex Niigata Ladies	
158		Sukumo Athletics Stadium	10,500	Sukumo, Kochi	Shikoku	Kochi United SC	
159		Fukuyama Tsuun Rose Stadium	10,081	Fukuyama, Hiroshima	Chūgoku	Fukuyama City FC	1978
160		Aomori City Baseball Stadium	10,010	Aomori	Aomori		1950
161		Baycom Stadium	10,000	Amagasaki	Kansai	Yanmar Diesel SC	
162		Kumamoto Ohzu Stadium	10,000	Kumamoto	Kyushu		
163		Coop Miyagi Megumino Football Field A	10,000	Rifu, Miyagi	Tōhoku	Sony Sendai FC	1988
164		Miyoshi Athletics Stadium	10,000	Miyoshi, Hiroshima	Chūgoku	Angeviolet Hiroshima	1993
165		Shizuoka Ashitaka Athletics Stadium	10,000	Numazu, Shizuoka	Chūbu	Azul Claro Numazu	1996
166		Kagawa Prefectural Football Stadium	10,000	Takamatsu, Kagawa	Shikoku	Kamatamare Sanuki	1987
167		Hachinohe Higashi Stadium	10,000	Hachinohe, Aomori	Tōhoku	Vanraure Hachinohe	1983
168		Mizubayashi Athletics Field	10,000	Yurihonjo, Akita	Tōhoku	TDK SC	1978
169		Takada Athletics Field	10,000	Joetsu, Niigata	Chubu		
170		Yokkaichi Athletics Stadium	10,000	Yokkaichi, Mie	Kansai	Cosmo Oil Yokkaichi FC, Veertien Mie	1968
171		Tsuyama Stadium	10,000	Tsuyama, Okayama	Chugoku		1994
172		Hiroshima Koiki Koen Daiichi Stadium	10,000	Hiroshima, Hiroshima	Chugoku		1993
173		Shunan Athletics Stadium	10,000	Shunan, Yamaguchi	Chugoku		1986
174		Sayagatani Athletics Stadium	10,000	Kitakyushu, Fukuoka	Kyushu	Giravanz Kitakyushu, Nippon Steel Yawata SC	
175		Ogori Athletics Stadium	10,000	Ogori, Fukuoka	Kyushu	Tosu Futures, Fukuoka J. Anclas	
176		Kasuga Playing Field	10,000	Kasuga, Fukuoka	Kyushu		
177		Global Arena Stadium	10,000	Munakata, Fukuoka	Kyushu	Munakata Sanix Blues	2000
178		Aobanomori Athletics Stadium	10,000	Chiba, Chiba	Kanto		1987
179		Yotsuike Park Athletics Stadium	10,000	Hamamatsu, Shizuoka	Chubu		1941
180		Echizen Higashi Athletics Stadium	10,000	Echizen, Fukui	Chubu		
181		Tachikawa Athletics Stadium	10,000	Tachikawa, Tokyo	Kanto		1959
182		Kitakyushu City Honjō Athletics Stadium	10,000	Kitakyushu	Kyushu	Giravanz Kitakyushu	1989

== Gallery ==
Other Japanese stadiums

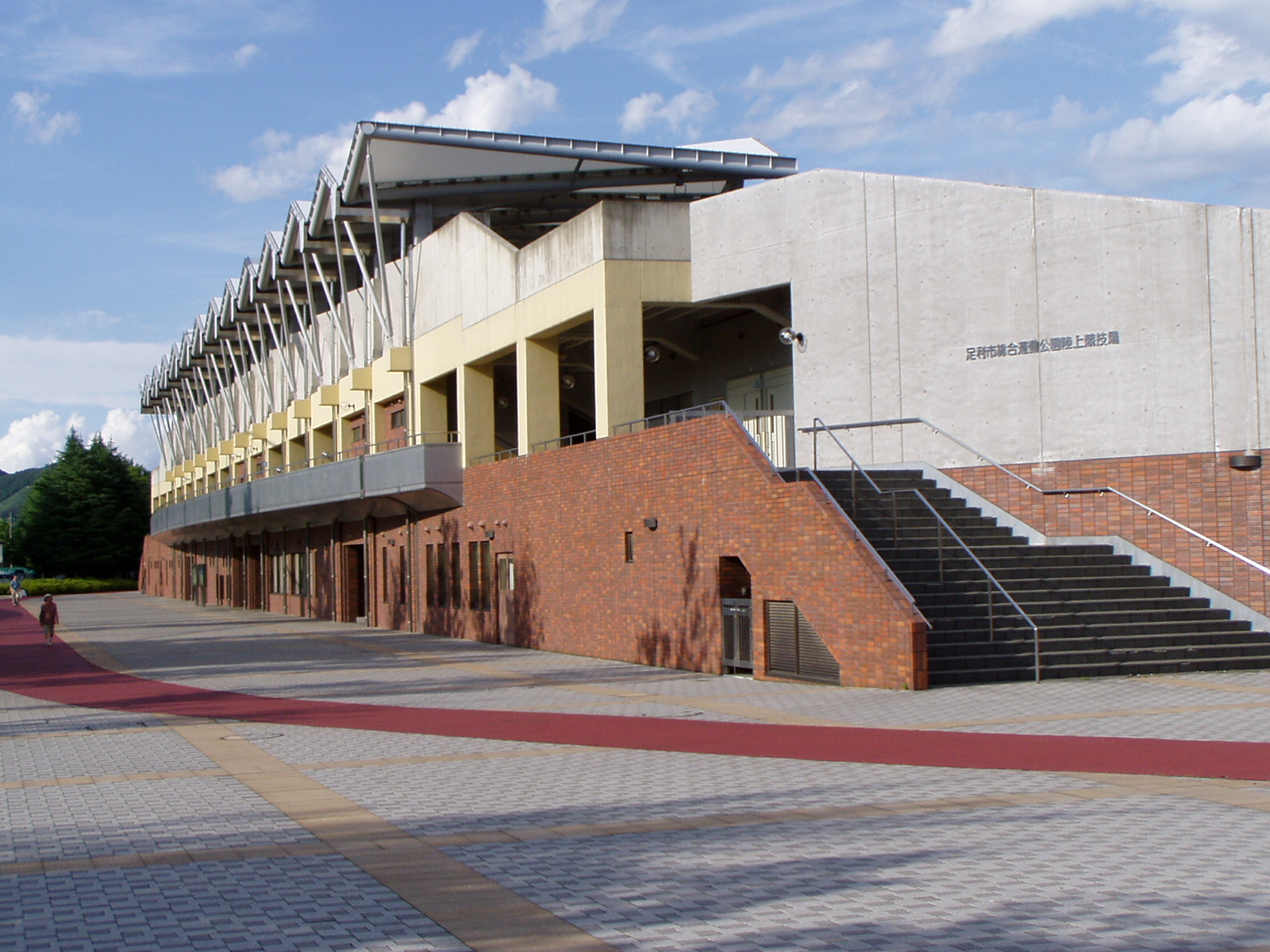
Ashikaga Athletics Stadium

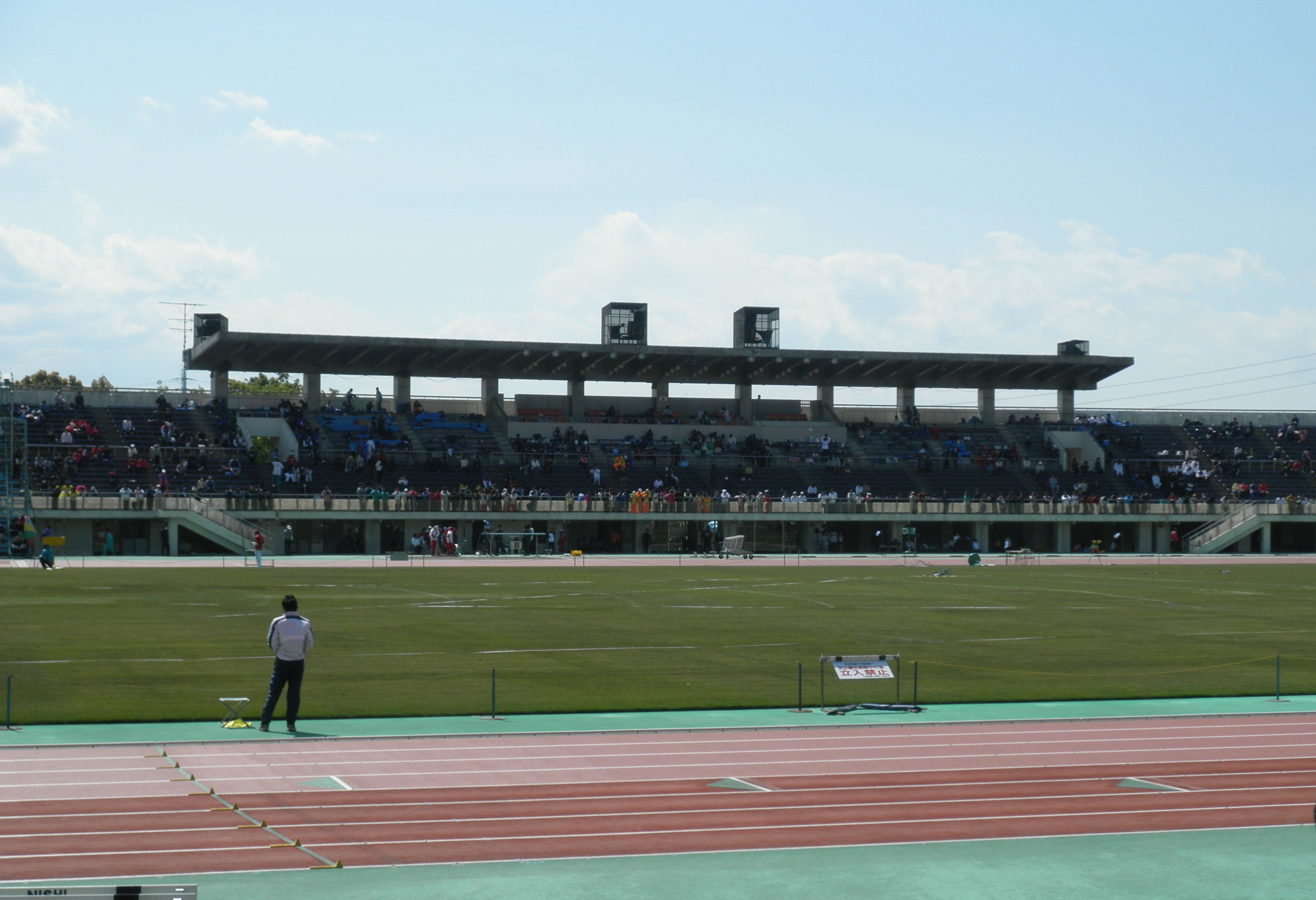
Kawagoe Athletics Stadium

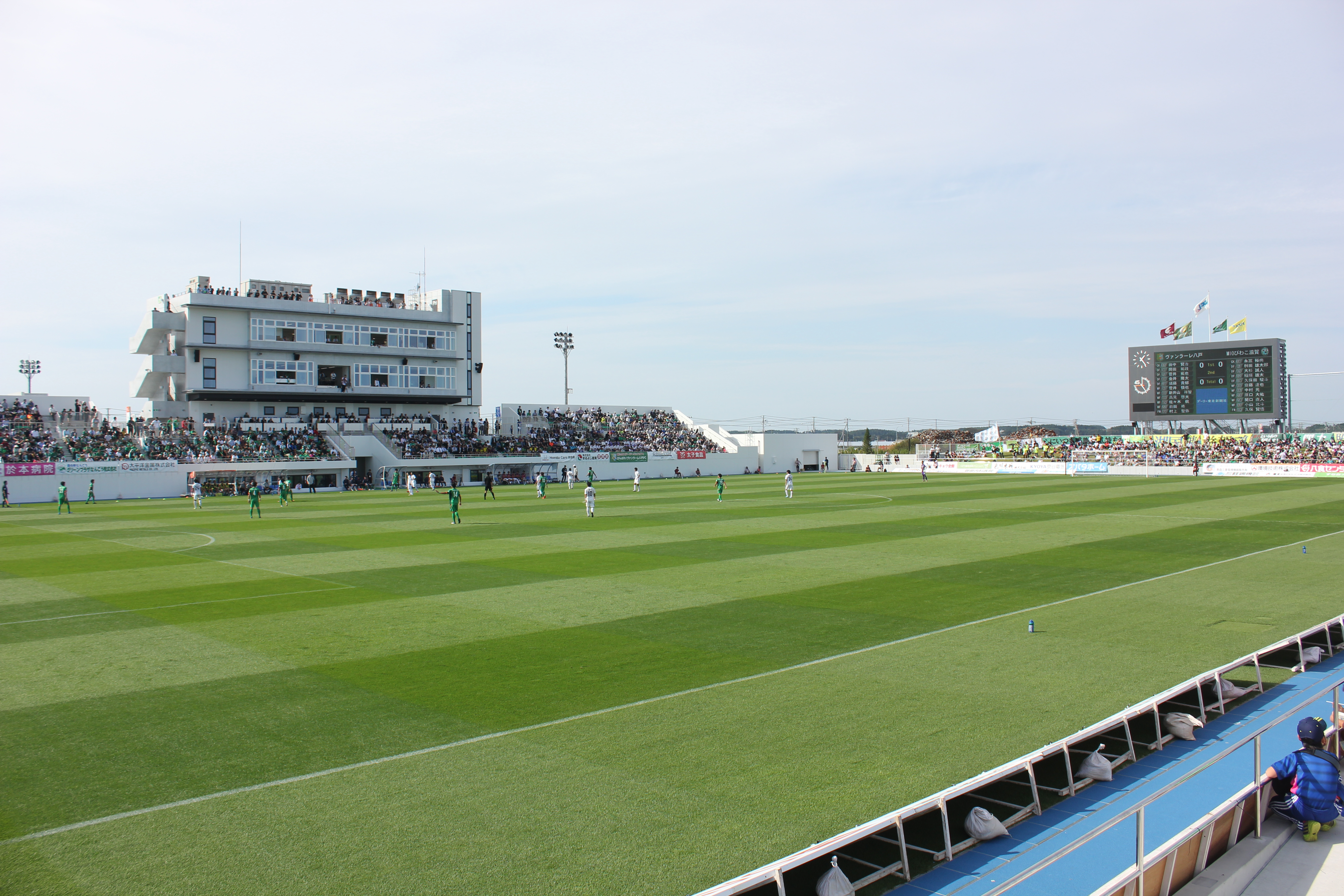
Prifoods Stadium

== See also ==
- List of football stadiums in Japan
- List of Asian stadiums by capacity
- List of association football stadiums by capacity
- Lists of stadiums
