= List of football stadiums in Japan =

The following is a list of football stadiums in Japan, ordered by capacity. All stadiums with a capacity of 5,000 or more are included.

== Current stadiums ==
=== Athletic track ===
#	Image	Stadium	Capacity	City	Region	Home team(s)	Opened
1		Japan National Stadium	80,016 (temporary seats); 67,750 (fixed capacity)	Shinjuku, Tokyo	Kantō	Japan national football team, FC Tokyo, Tokyo Verdy, Tokyo Sungoliath, Brave Lupus Tokyo	2019
2		International Stadium Yokohama	72,327	Yokohama, Kanagawa	Kantō	Yokohama F. Marinos, Yokohama Eagles	1997
3		Stadium Ecopa	50,889	Fukuroi, Shizuoka	Chūbu	Júbilo Iwata, Shimizu S-Pulse (select matches), Shizuoka Blue Revs (select matches)	2001
4		Hiroshima Big Arch	50,000	Hiroshima city, Hiroshima	Chūgoku		1993
5		Ajinomoto Stadium	49,970	Chofu, Tokyo	Kantō	FC Tokyo, Tokyo Verdy	2000
6		Miyagi Stadium	49,133	Rifu, Miyagi	Tōhoku	Vegalta Sendai (select matches)	2000
7		Nagai Stadium	47,853	Osaka city, Osaka	Kansai	Cerezo Osaka, Red Hurricanes Osaka	1964
8		Kobe Universiade Memorial Stadium	45,000	Kobe, Hyogo	Kansai	Vissel Kobe (select matches)	1978
9		Denka Big Swan Stadium	42,300	Niigata city, Niigata	Chūbu	Albirex Niigata	2001
10		Crasus Dome Oita	40,000	Ōita city, Ōita	Kyushu	Oita Trinita	2001
11		Egao Kenko Stadium	32,000	Kumamoto city, Kumamoto	Kyushu	Roasso Kumamoto	1998
12		Rohto Field Nara	30,600	Nara city, Nara	Kansai	Nara Club	1983
13		Pikara Stadium	30,099	Marugame, Kagawa	Shikoku	Kamatamare Sanuki	1997
14		Chiba Sports Center Stadium	30,000	Chiba city, Chiba	Kantō		1966
15		Hakatanomori Athletics Stadium	30,000	Fukuoka city, Fukuoka	Kyushu	Avispa Fukuoka	1990
16		Iwate Athletics Stadium	30,000	Morioka, Iwate	Tōhoku	Grulla Morioka	1966
17		Paloma Mizuho Stadium	30,000	Nagoya, Aichi	Chūbu	Nagoya Grampus	2026
18		Yamata Sports Park Stadium	30,000	Tottori city, Tottori	Chūgoku	Gainare Tottori	1966
19		Koshin Gom Athlete Park Sendai	30,000	Sendai, Miyagi	Tōhoku	Brummell Sendai	1952
20		Kusanagi Athletics Stadium	28,000	Shizuoka city, Shizuoka	Chūbu	Shimizu S-Pulse	1957
21		Todoroki Athletics Stadium	27,495	Kawasaki, Kanagawa	Kantō	Kawasaki Frontale; NKK SC	1962
22		Gifu Nagaragawa Stadium	26,109	Gifu city, Gifu	Chūbu	FC Gifu	1991
23		Toyama Athletics Stadium	25,251	Toyama city, Toyama	Chūbu	Kataller Toyama	1993
24		Kanseki Stadium Tochigi	25,244	Utsunomiya, Tochigi	Kanto	Tochigi SC	2020
25		Heiwadai Athletics Stadium	25,000	Fukuoka city, Fukuoka	Kyushu	Fukuoka Blux	1948
26		Kochi Haruno Athletics Stadium	25,000	Haruno, Kōchi	Shikoku	Kochi United	1987
27		Tapic Kenso Hiyagon Stadium	25,000	Okinawa city, Okinawa	Kyushu	Ryukyu Okinawa; Okinawa SV	1987
28		Matsumoto Daira Athletics Stadium	25,000	Matsumoto, Nagano	Chubu		1977
29		Matsue Athletics Stadium	24,000	Matsue, Shimane	Chūgoku	Kagura Shimane	1981
30		Saving Athletics Stadium	23,939	Shimonoseki, Yamaguchi	Chugoku	Renofa Yamaguchi; Baleine Shimonoseki	1958
31		Takasago Athletics Stadium	23,200	Takasago, Hyogo	Kansai	Takasago Mineiro	
32		Kasamatsu Stadium	22,002	Hitachinaka, Ibaraki	Kantō	Mito HollyHock	1973
33		Akita Prefectural Central Park Athletics Stadium	22,000	Akita city, Akita	Tōhoku	Saruta Kōgyō SC [tl] Akita FC Cambiare	1984
34		Kitakami Stadium	22,000	Kitakami, Iwate	Tōhoku	Iwate Grulla Morioka	1997
35		Urawa Komaba Stadium	21,500	Saitama city, Saitama	Kantō	Urawa Red Diamonds	1967
36		ND Soft Stadium Yamagata	21,292	Tendō, Yamagata	Tōhoku	Montedio Yamagata	1991
37		Toho Stadium	21,000	Fukushima city, Fukushima	Tōhoku	Fukushima United	
38		Osaka Expo '70 Stadium	21,000	Suita, Osaka	Kansai	Gamba Osaka	1972
39		Sapporo Atsubetsu Park Stadium	20,861	Sapporo, Hokkaido	Hokkaido	Hokkaido Consadole Sapporo	1986
40		Kakuhiro Group Athletics Stadium	20,809	Aomori city, Aomori	Tōhoku	ReinMeer Aomori	2019
41		Takebishi Stadium Kyoto	20,688	Kyoto city, Kyoto	Kansai	Kyoto Sanga	1942
42		Pocarisweat Stadium	20,441	Naruto, Tokushima	Shikoku	Tokushima Vortis	1971
43		Ishikawa Kanazawa Stadium	20,261	Kanazawa, Ishikawa	Chūbu	Zweigen Kanazawa	
44		Transcosmos Stadium Nagasaki	20,246	Nagasaki City, Nagasaki	Kyushu	V-Varen Nagasaki (2013–2024)	1969
45		Soyu Stadium	20,125	Akita city, Akita	Tōhoku	Blaublitz Akita	1941
46		Komazawa Olympic Park Stadium	20,010	Setagaya, Tokyo	Kantō	Black Rams Tokyo	1964
47		Kishiro Stadium	20,000	Akashi, Hyōgo	Kansai		1974
48		Hinata Stadium	20,000	Miyazaki, Miyazaki	Kyushu	Minebea Mitsumi FC; Estrela Miyazaki	1974
49		Kashiwanoha Park Stadium	20,000	Kashiwa, Chiba	Kantō	Kashiwa Reysol	1999
50		JFE Harenokuni Stadium	20,000	Okayama city, Okayama	Chūgoku	Fagiano Okayama	1957
51		Ningineer Stadium	20,000	Matsuyama, Ehime	Shikoku	Ehime FC	1979
52		Miki Park Stadium	20,000	Miki, Hyōgo	Kansai	Vissel Kobe	2005
53		Ishin Me-Life Stadium	20,000	Yamaguchi, Yamaguchi	Chūgoku	Renofa Yamaguchi	1963
54		Gofuku Athletics Stadium	20,000	Toyama, Toyama	Chubu	Kataller Toyama	1957
55		Ota Athletics Stadium	20,000 (expanded)	Ōta, Gunma	Kantō	Saitama Wild Knights	1974
56		Kurayoshi Athletics Stadium	20,000	Kurayoshi, Tottori	Chugoku		
57		Shiranami Stadium	19,934	Kagoshima city, Kagoshima	Kyushu	Kagoshima United, Je Vrille Kagoshima	1972
58		Kimiidera Athletics Stadium	19,200	Wakayama city, Wakayama	Kansai	Arterivo Wakayama	1964
59		Mie Kotsu Athletics Stadium	19,067	Ise, Mie	Kansai	Veertien Mie, Mie Heat	1968
60		Niigata City Athletics Stadium	18,671	Niigata, Niigata	Chūbu	Albirex Niigata (1998–2001)	1936
61		Obihiro Athletics Stadium	18,504	Obihiro, Hokkaido	Hokkaido	Hokkaido Tokachi Sky Earth	1983
62		Yokohama Mitsuzawa Athletics Stadium	18,300	Yokohama, Kanagawa	Kanto	YSCC Yokohama	1951
63		Nagano Athletics Stadium	17,200 (expanded)	Nagano, Nagano	Chūbu	Nagano Parceiro	1976
64		JIT Recycle Ink Stadium	17,000	Kōfu, Yamanashi	Chūbu	Ventforet Kofu	1985
65		Saga Athletics Stadium	17,000	Saga, Saga	Kyushu	Sagan Tosu	1970
66		Kurume Athletics Stadium	17,000	Kurume, Fukuoka	Kyushu		
67		Akita Prefectural Central Park Playing Field	16,500	Akita city, Akita	Tōhoku	Saruta Kōgyō SC [tl] Akita FC Cambiare	1984
68		Hanasaki Sports Park Stadium	16,500	Asahikawa, Hokkaido	Hokkaido		1982
69		Shinobugaoka Stadium	16,400	Fukushima, Fukushima	Tōhoku	Fukushima United	1951
70		Mutsu Athletics Stadium	16,200	Mutsu, Aomori	Tōhoku	ReinMeer Aomori	1968
71		Kakidomari Stadium	16,000	Nagasaki	Kyushu	V-Varen Nagasaki	
72		9.98 Stadium	16,000	Fukui, Fukui	Chubu		1967
73		Doradora Park Yonago Stadium	16,000	Yonago, Tottori	Chugoku	Gainare Tottori	
74		Oita Athletics Stadium	15,943	Ōita, Ōita	Kyushu	Oita Trinita	1965
75		Hamayama Athletics Stadium	15,700	Izumo, Shimane	Chugoku	Kagura Shimane	1980
76		Lemon Gas Stadium Hiratsuka	15,690	Hiratsuka, Kanagawa	Kantō	Shonan Bellmare	1987
77		Satsumasendai Athletics Stadium	15,560	Satsumasendai, Kagoshima	Kyushu		
78		Yanmar Field Nagai	15,516	Osaka	Kansai	Cerezo Osaka (2006–2007); Sagawa Express Osaka SC	1993
79		Machida Gion Stadium	15,489 (Expanded)	Machida, Tokyo	Kantō	Machida Zelvia	1990
80		Kōriyama Hirose Kaiseizan Athletics Stadium	15,474	Kōriyama, Fukushima	Tōhoku	Fukushima FC	
81		Kumagaya Athletics Stadium	15,392	Kumagaya, Saitama	Kantō	Omiya Ardija	2003
82		Sagamihara Gion Stadium	15,300	Minami-ku, Sagamihara	Kantō	SC Sagamihara, Machida Zelvia (2010)	2007
83		Kakogawa Athletics Stadium	15,275	Kakogawa, Hyōgo	Kansai	Cento Cuore Harima FC	1998
84		Shoda Shoyu Stadium Gunma	15,253	Maebashi, Gunma	Kantō	Thespa Kusatsu, Thespa Gunma (2005–)	1951
85		Wink Athletics Stadium	15,000	Himeji, Hyōgo	Kansai	AS Harima Albion	1964
86		Hitachinaka City Stadium	15,000	Hitachinaka, Ibaraki	Kantō	Ryutsu Keizai University FC	1998
87		Nobeoka Nishishina Athletics Stadium	15,000	Nobeoka, Miyazaki	Kyushu	Honda Lock	1968
88		Toso Athletics Stadium	15,000	Asahi, Chiba	Kanto		2001
89		Odawara Athletics Stadium	15,000	Odawara, Kanagawa	Kanto		1955
90		Yamanokuchi Athletics Stadium	15,000 (expanding)	Miyakonojo, Miyazaki	Kyushu		
91		Hakodate Chiyogadai Stadium	15,000	Hakodate, Hokkaido	Hokkaido	Consadole Sapporo	2001
92		Suizenji Stadium	15,000	Kumamoto	Kyushu	Roasso Kumamoto	1960
93		Ueda Castle Athletics Stadium	15,000	Ueda, Nagano	Chubu		1928
94		Saijo Hiuchi Athletics Stadium	14,980	Saijo, Ehime	Shikoku	FC Imabari	
95		Iwaki Athletics Stadium	14,766	Iwaki, Fukushima	Tōhoku	Fukushima United FC	1971
96		Chatan Athletics Stadium	14,221	Chatan, Okinawa	Kyushu	FC Ryukyu	1988
97		ZA Oripri Stadium	14,051	Ichihara, Chiba	Kantō	JEF United Ichihara Chiba (1993–2005)	1993
98		Hiroshima General Ground Main Stadium	13,800	Hiroshima	Chūgoku	Sanfrecce Hiroshima	1941
99		Okinawa City Stadium	13,400	Okinawa, Okinawa	Kyushu	FC Ryukyu	1973
100		Work Staff Athletics Stadium	13,000	Tokushima city, Tokushima	Shikoku		1976
101		Muroran Irie Stadium	12,600	Muroran, Hokkaido	Hokkaido	Consadole Sapporo	1988
102		Toyohashi Athletics Stadium	12,600	Toyohashi, Aichi	Chubu		
103		Hamamatsu Stadium	12,500	Hamamatsu, Shizuoka	Chūbu	PJM Futures	1988
104		Ikimenomori Athletics Park	12,000	Miyazaki, Miyazaki	Kyushu	Honda Lock SC	2006
105		K's denki Stadium Mito	12,000	Mito, Ibaraki	Kantō	Mito HollyHock	1987
106		Sapporo Maruyama Athletics Stadium	12,000	Sapporo, Hokkaido	Hokkaido		1934
107		Hirosaki Athletics Stadium	12,000	Hirosaki, Aomori	Tohoku	Blancdieu Hirosaki FC	
108		Ojiyama Stadium	12,000	Ōtsu, Shiga	Kansai	MIO Biwako Shiga	1964
109		Kushiro Stadium	11,600	Kushiro, Hokkaido	Hokkaido	Consadole Sapporo	1987
110		Fujihokuroku Park Stadium	11,105	Fujiyoshida, Yamanashi	Chūbu	Ventforet Kofu	1985
111		Inagi Athletics Stadium	11,000	Inagi, Tokyo	Kanto	Nippon TV Tokyo Verdy Beleza	1991
112		Tsuruga Athletics Stadium	11,000	Tsuruga, Fukui	Chubu		
113		Sasebo Athletics Stadium	11,000	Sasebo, Nagasaki	Kyushu		1967
114		Toyokawa Athletics Stadium	10,698	Toyokawa, Aichi	Chubu	Rivielta Toyokawa	1964
115		Nagaoka Athletics Stadium	10,622	Nagaoka, Niigata	Chubu	Albirex Niigata Ladies	
116		Sukumo Athletics Stadium	10,500	Sukumo, Kochi	Shikoku	Kochi United SC	
117		Fukuyama Tsuun Rose Stadium	10,081	Fukuyama, Hiroshima	Chūgoku	Fukuyama City FC	1978
118		Baycom Stadium	10,000	Amagasaki	Kansai	Yanmar Diesel SC	
119		Miyoshi Athletics Stadium	10,000	Miyoshi, Hiroshima	Chūgoku	Angeviolet Hiroshima	1993
120		Shizuoka Ashitaka Athletics Stadium	10,000	Numazu, Shizuoka	Chūbu	Azul Claro Numazu	1996
121		Hachinohe Higashi Stadium	10,000	Hachinohe, Aomori	Tōhoku	Vanraure Hachinohe	1983
122		Mizubayashi Athletics Field	10,000	Yurihonjo, Akita	Tōhoku	TDK SC	1978
123		Takada Athletics Field	10,000	Joetsu, Niigata	Chubu		
124		Yokkaichi Athletics Stadium	10,000	Yokkaichi, Mie	Kansai	Cosmo Oil Yokkaichi FC; Veertien Mie	1968
125		Tsuyama Stadium	10,000	Tsuyama, Okayama	Chugoku	Fagiano Okayama	1994
126		Mizushima Greenery Fukuda Park Athletics Stadium	10,000	Kurashiki, Okayama	Chugoku	Fagiano Okayama	1976
127		Hiroshima Koiki Koen Daiichi Stadium	10,000	Hiroshima, Hiroshima	Chugoku	Sanfrecce Hiroshima	1993
128		Shunan Athletics Stadium	10,000	Shunan, Yamaguchi	Chugoku		1986
129		Sayagatani Athletics Stadium	10,000	Kitakyushu, Fukuoka	Kyushu	Giravanz Kitakyushu; Nippon Steel Yawata SC	
130		Ogori Athletics Stadium	10,000	Ogori, Fukuoka	Kyushu	Tosu Futures; Fukuoka J. Anclas	
131		Aobanomori Athletics Stadium	10,000	Chiba, Chiba	Kanto		1987
132		Yotsuike Park Athletics Stadium	10,000	Hamamatsu, Shizuoka	Chubu		1941
133		Echizen Higashi Athletics Stadium	10,000	Echizen, Fukui	Chubu		
134		Tachikawa Athletics Stadium	10,000	Tachikawa, Tokyo	Kanto		1959
135		Kitakyushu City Honjō Athletics Stadium	10,000	Kitakyushu	Kyushu	Giravanz Kitakyushu	1989
136		Saku Athletics Stadium	9,500	Saku, Nagano	Chubu	AC Nagano Parceiro Ladies	2013
137		Kitami Athletics Stadium	9,400	Kitami, Hokkaido	Hokkaido		1965
138		Bingo Athletics Stadium	9,245	Onomichi, Hiroshima	Chūgoku		1993
139		Handa Athletics Stadium	9,074	Handa, Aichi	Chūbu	Daido Steel SC	2002
140		Kashima Athletics Stadium	9,000	Kashima, Saga	Kyushu	Saga LIXIL F.C.	
141		Onoyama Athletics Field	9,000	Naha, Okinawa	Kyushu		1965
142		Itoman Nishizaki Athletics Field	9,000	Itoman, Okinawa	Kyushu		
143		Oga Athletics Stadium	9,000	Oga, Akita	Tohoku	Blaublitz Akita	
144		Green Stadium Shibata	8,800	Shibata, Niigata	Chubu	Albirex Niigata Ladies	1980
145		Kawagoe Athletics Stadium	8,500	Kawagoe, Saitama	Kantō	Chifure AS Elfen Saitama	
146		Hitachi Athletics Stadium	8,464	Hitachi, Ibaraki	Kantō	Mito HollyHock	1974
147		Ageo Athletics Stadium	8,100	Ageo, Saitama	Kantō		1966
148		Towada Athletics Stadium	8,020	Towada, Aomori	Tohoku		1958
149		Kumamoto Hojo Stadium	8,000	Kumamoto, Kumamoto	Kyushu	Kumamoto Prefecture Teachers	
150		Yamami Mihara Athletics Stadium	7,927	Mihara, Hiroshima	Chugoku		
151		Yonezawa Stadium	7,600	Yonezawa, Yamagata	Tohoku		
152		Nopporo Stadium	7,500	Ebetsu, Hokkaido	Hokkaido		1993
153		Ashikaga Athletics Stadium	7,500	Ashikaga, Tochigi	Kanto	Tochigi SC	1947
154		Higashihiroshima Athletics Stadium	7,400	Higashihiroshima, Hiroshima	Chugoku	Angeviolet Hiroshima	1995
155		Aizu Athletics Park Stadium	7,300	Aizuwakamatsu, Fukushima	Tōhoku	Fukushima FC	2013
156		Shinjo Stadium	7,050	Shinjo, Yamagata	Tōhoku		1977
157		Shimotsuke Stadium	7,000	Shimotsuke, Tochigi	Kanto		1978
158		Chita Athletics Stadium	7,000	Chita, Aichi	Chubu		
159		Taiyogaoka Stadium	7,000	Amami, Kagoshima	Kyushu		
160		Tsuruoka Komagihara Stadium	7,000	Tsuruoka, Yamagata	Tōhoku	Montedio Yamagata	1990
161		Yamashiro Park Taiyogaoka Stadium	7,000	Uji, Kyoto	Kansai	Sagawa Printing SC; SP Kyoto FC	1982
162		Funabashi Athletics Stadium	7,000	Funabashi, Chiba	Kanto		
163		Shibukawa Athletics Stadium	7,000	Shibukawa, Gunma	Kanto	Thespakusatsu Gunma	1976
164		Edogawa Stadium	6,950	Edogawa, Tokyo	Kantō	Yokogawa Musashino FC	1984
165		Hattori Athletics Stadium	6,949	Toyonaka, Osaka	Kansai	FC Osaka	1950
166		Akiruno Stadium	6,700	Akiruno, Tokyo	Kanto		1988
167		Gotemba Athletics Stadium	6,560	Gotemba, Shizuoka	Chubu		
168		Shiroi Athletics Stadium	6,500	Shiroi, Chiba	Kanto		
169		Tokamachi Sasayama Athletics Stadium	6,500	Tokamachi, Niigata	Chubu	Albirex Niigata Ladies	
170		Kokubu Athletics Stadium	6,500	Kirishima, Kagoshima	Kyushu	Kagoshima United FC	
171		Uozu Momoyama Sports Park Stadium	6,420	Uozu, Toyama	Chubu	YKK AP SC	1987
172		Shiwa Athletics Stadium	6,400	Shiwa, Iwate	Tohoku	FC Shiwa	
173		Tamura Athletics Stadium	6,311	Tamura, Fukushima	Tohoku	FC Primeiro	
174		ANA Field Urasoe	6,254	Urasoe, Okinawa	Kyushu		
175		Tomakomai Stadium	6,000	Tomakomai, Hokkaido	Hokkaido		1981
176		Odate Athletics Stadium	6,000	Odate, Akita	Tohoku		1983
177		Sano Stadium	6,000	Sano, Tochigi	Kanto		
178		Hikone Athletics Stadium	6,000	Hikone, Shiga	Kansai		1939
179		Kameoka Athletics Stadium	6,000	Kameoka, Kyoto	Kansai		
180		Yashima Rexxam Field	6,000	Takamatsu, Kagawa	Shikoku	Kamatamare Sanuki	1953
181		Karatsu Athletics Stadium	6,000	Karatsu, Saga	Kyushu	Sagan Tosu	
182		Tamashima Athletics Field	6,000	Kurashiki, Okayama	Chugoku		1982
183		Hofu Sports Center Athletic Field	6,000	Hōfu, Yamaguchi	Chūgoku		
184		Toin Sport Park Stadium	6,000	Tōin, Mie	Kansai	Veertien Mie	1992
185		Imari Kunimidai Athletics Stadium	6,000	Imari, Saga	Kyushu		
186		Shirakobato Athletics Stadium	5,900	Koshigaya, Saitama	Kanto		
187		Kasaoka Athletics Field	5,898	Kasaoka, Okayama	Chugoku	Kibi International University Charme Okayama Takahashi	2005
188		Susono Athletics Stadium	5,892	Susono, Shizuoka	Chubu	Jatco SC	
189		Komatsu Suehiro Athletics Stadium	5,800	Komatsu, Ishikawa	Chubu		
190		Sakata City Hikarigaoka Athletics Field	5,600	Sakata, Yamagata	Tohoku		1955
191		Atsugi Athletics Field	5,532	Atsugi, Kanagawa	Kanto		1989
192		Hita Athletics Stadium	5,500	Hita, Oita	Kyushu	Verspah Oita	
193		Tochigi City Stadium	5,500	Tochigi, Tochigi	Kantō	Tochigi Uva FC	
194		Toyota Athletics Stadium	5,500	Toyota, Aichi	Chūbu	Nagoya Grampus	2001
195		Omachi Athletics Stadium	5,400	Omachi, Nagano	Chubu		
196		Nishihara Athletics Stadium	5,400	Nishihara, Okinawa	Kyushu		
197		Kaga Athletics Stadium	5,360	Kaga, Ishikawa	Chubu		
198		Tainai Athletics Stadium	5,300	Tainai, Niigata	Chubu	Albirex Niigata Ladies	
199		Koganemori Athletics Stadium	5,300	Haebaru, Okinawa	Kyushu	Kaiho Bank SC	
200		Kashiwazaki Athletics Stadium	5,225	Kashiwazaki, Niigata	Chubu		
201		Kakuda Stadium	5,200	Kakuda, Miyagi	Tōhoku	Sony Sendai FC	1992
202		Kanagawa Prefectural Stadium	5,200	Fujisawa, Kanagawa	Kanto	Esperanza Sports Club	1962
203		Iwana Athletics Stadium	5,122	Sakura, Chiba	Kanto		
204		Matto Athletics Stadium	5,100	Hakusan, Ishikawa	Chubu		1993
205		Nunobiki Green Stadium	5,060	Higashiomi, Shiga	Kansai	MIO Biwako Shiga	2010
206		Shiroya Seaside Park Stadium	5,027	Tahara, Aichi	Chubu		
207		Kamiyugi Park Athletics Stadium	5,007	Hachioji, Tokyo	Kanto		
208		Iwanuma Stadium	5,000	Iwanuma, Miyagi	Tōhoku		
209		Oyama Stadium	5,000	Oyama, Tochigi	Kanto	Tochigi City FC	
210		Isesaki Kezojo Athletics Stadium	5,000	Isesaki, Gunma	Kanto	Arte Takasaki	
211		Oi Wharf AthleticStadium	5,000	Shinagawa, Tokyo	Kanto		
212		Asahi Ground	5,000	Murakami, Niigata	Chubu		
213		Sado Mano Athletics Stadium	5,000	Sado, Niigata	Chubu		
214		Sugadaira Sports Land Main Ground	5,000	Ueda, Nagano	Chubu		1999
215		Takaoka Jokoji Athletics Stadium	5,000	Takaoka, Toyama	Chubu		1978
216		Oyabe Athletics Stadium	5,000	Oyabe, Toyama	Chubu		
217		Kofu Midorigaoka Sports Park Stadium	5,000	Kofu, Yamanashi	Chubu	Kofu Club	1952
218		Kashihara Athletics Stadium	5,000	Kashihara, Nara	Kansai	Nara Club	
219		Hamada Athletics Stadium	5,000	Hamada, Shimane	Chugoku	Dezzolla Shimane	
220		Onda Athletics Stadium	5,000	Ube, Yamaguchi	Chugoku		1940
221		Tosu Athletics Stadium	5,000	Tosu, Saga	Kyushu	Sagan Tosu	
222		Saiki Chuo Hospital Stadium	5,000	Saiki, Oita	Kyushu	Verspah Oita	
223		Ogaki Asanaka Stadium	5,000	Ogaki, Gifu	Chubu	Seino Transportation SC	1987
224		Fuji Athletics Stadium	5,000	Fuji, Shizuoka	Chūbu	FC Azul Claro Numazu	
225		Konosu Stadium	5,000	Kōnosu, Saitama	Kantō	Saitama S.C.	
226		Musashino Municipal Athletics Stadium	5,000	Musashino, Tokyo	Kantō	Yokogawa Musashino FC	1989
227		Yumenoshima Stadium	5,000	Koto, Tokyo	Kantō	FC Tokyo U-23; Sagawa Express Tokyo SC	
228		Toneri Park Athletics Stadium	5,000	Adachi, Tokyo	Kantō	Aries Tokyo FC	
229		Tama Athletics Stadium	5,000	Tama, Tokyo	Kantō	Nippon TV Tokyo Verdy Beleza	1986
230		Obama City General Ground	5,000	Obama, Fukui	Chubu		
231		Togane Stadium	5,000	Togane, Chiba	Kanto	JEF United Chiba Ladies	
232		Shimabara Athletics Stadium	5,000	Shimabara, Nagasaki	Kyushu		
233		Ichinoseki Athletics Stadium	5,000	Ichinoseki, Iwate	Tōhoku	Nu-Pere Hiraizumi Maesawa	
234		Ina Athletics Stadium	5,000	Ina, Nagano	Chubu		
235		Iida Matsuo Ground	5,000	Iida, Nagano	Chubu		
236		Nomi Monomiyama Athletics Stadium	5,000	Nomi, Ishikawa	Chubu		
237		Okuetsu Fureai Park Athletics Stadium	5,000	Ono, Fukui	Chubu	Ono FC	1993
238		Kanaoka Athletics Stadium	5,000	Sakai, Osaka	Kansai		1959
239		Yaita Athletics Field	5,000	Yaita, Tochigi	Kanto	Vertfee Yaita	
240		Kanzakiyama Athletics Stadium	5,000	Okayama, Okayama	Chugoku	Mitsubishi Mizushima FC	
241		Nakadai Athletics Stadium	5,000	Narita, Chiba	Kanto	JEF United Chiba Ladies	1983
242		Alpas	5,000	Kazuno, Akita	Tohoku	Akita FC Cambiare	1998
243		Maruyasu Ryuhoku Stadium	5,000	Okazaki, Aichi	Chubu	FC Maruyasu Okazaki	1968

=== Football and Rugby field ===
#	Image	Stadium	Capacity	City	Region	Home team(s)	Opened
1		Saitama Stadium 2002	63,700	Saitama City, Saitama	Kantō	Japan national football team, Urawa Red Diamonds	2001
2		Toyota Stadium	45,000	Toyota, Aichi	Chūbu	Nagoya Grampus, Toyota Verblitz	2001
3		Sapporo Dome	41,484	Sapporo, Hokkaido	Hokkaido	Hokkaido Consadole Sapporo	2001
4		Kashima Soccer Stadium	40,728	Kashima, Ibaraki	Kantō	Kashima Antlers	1993
5		Panasonic Stadium Suita	39,694	Suita, Osaka	Kansai	Gamba Osaka	2015
6		Noevir Stadium Kobe	30,132	Kobe, Hyogo	Kansai	Vissel Kobe, Kobe Steelers	2001
7		Edion Peace Wing Hiroshima	28,520	Hiroshima	Chūgoku	Sanfrecce Hiroshima, Skyactivs Hiroshima, Chugoku Red Regulions	2024
8		Hanazono Rugby Stadium	27,346	Higashiosaka, Osaka	Kansai	Hanazono Liners; FC Osaka	1929
9		Yodoko Sakura Stadium	25,000	Osaka city, Osaka	Kansai	Cerezo Osaka, Red Hurricanes Osaka	1987
10		Chichibunomiya Rugby Stadium	24,871	Minato, Tokyo	Kanto	Tokyo Sungoliath, Brave Lupus Tokyo, Urayasu D-Rocks	1947
11		Ekimae Real Estate Stadium	24,490	Tosu, Saga	Kyushu	Sagan Tosu	1996
12		Kumagaya Rugby Ground	24,000	Kumagaya, Saitama	Kanto	Saitama Wild Knights	1991
13		Sanga Stadium by Kyocera	21,600	Kameoka, Kyoto	Kansai	Kyoto Sanga	2020
14		Best Denki Stadium	21,562	Fukuoka city, Fukuoka	Kyushu	Avispa Fukuoka	1995
15		Technoport Fukui Stadium	21,053	Sakai, Fukui	Chūbu	Fukui United FC	1994
16		IAI Stadium Nihondaira	20,339	Shizuoka, Shizuoka	Chūbu	Shimizu S-Pulse	1991
17		Peace Stadium Connected by SoftBank	20,027	Nagasaki City, Nagasaki	Kyushu	V-Varen Nagasaki	2024
18		Sunpro Alwin	20,000	Matsumoto, Nagano	Chūbu	Antelope Shiojiri, Matsumoto Yamaga	1999
19		Nagoya City Minato Football Stadium	20,000	Nagoya, Aichi	Chūbu	Maruyasu Okazaki	1993
20		Fukuda Denshi Arena	19,781	Chiba city, Chiba	Kantō	JEF United Chiba	2005
21		Yurtec Stadium Sendai	19,134	Sendai, Miyagi	Tōhoku	Sony Sendai FC, Vegalta Sendai	1997
22		Tochigi Green Stadium	18,025	Utsunomiya, Tochigi	Kantō	Tochigi SC	1993
23		Axis Bird Stadium	16,033	Tottori, Tottori	Chūgoku	Gainare Tottori	1996
24		NACK5 Stadium Omiya	15,500	Saitama, Saitama	Kantō	RB Omiya Ardija	1964
25		Nagano U Stadium	15,491 (expanded)	Nagano, Nagano	Chūbu	Nagano Parceiro	2002
26		NHK Spring Mitsuzawa Football Stadium	15,454	Yokohama	Kantō	Yokohama FC; YSCC Yokohama; Yokohama Flügels	1955
27		Sankyo Frontier Kashiwa Stadium	15,349	Kashiwa, Chiba	Kantō	Kashiwa Reysol	1986
28		Mikuni World Stadium Kitakyushu	15,300	Kitakyushu, Fukuoka	Kyushu	Giravanz Kitakyushu	2017
29		Yamaha Stadium	15,165	Iwata, Shizuoka	Chūbu	Jubilo Iwata, Shizuoka Blue Revs	1978
30		Mizuho Rugby Stadium	15,000	Nagoya	Chūbu	Toyota Verblitz	1941
31		Kunugidaira Football Fields	15,000	Fujikawaguchiko, Yamanashi	Chubu		1995
32		Fujieda Football Stadium	13,000	Fujieda, Shizuoka	Chubu	Fujieda MYFC	2002
33		Kusanagi Ball Game Field	12,000	Shizuoka, Shizuoka	Chubu	Shizuoka FC	1957
34		Mie Suzuka Sports Garden	12,000	Suzuka, Mie	Kansai	Suzuka Point Getters, Mie Heat	1992
35		Coop Miyagi Megumino Football Field A	10,000	Rifu, Miyagi	Tōhoku	Sony Sendai FC	1988
36		Kagawa Prefectural Football Stadium	10,000	Takamatsu, Kagawa	Shikoku	Kamatamare Sanuki	1987
37		Kumamoto Ohzu Stadium	10,000	Kumamoto	Kyushu	Roasso Kumamoto	
38		Kasuga Playing Field	10,000	Kasuga, Fukuoka	Kyushu		
39		Global Arena Stadium	10,000	Munakata, Fukuoka	Kyushu	Munakata Sanix Blues	2000
40		Obihiro Ball Game Field	8,400	Obihiro, Hokkaido	Hokkaido	Hokkaido Tokachi Sky Earth	1983
41		Nitto Shinko Stadium Maruoka	8,000	Sakai, Fukui	Chubu	Sakai Phoenix SC	1992
42		Kasamatsu Playing Field	8,000	Hitachinaka, Ibaraki	Kanto		1974
43		Earth Care Gunma Shikishima Football Stadium	7,800	Maebashi, Gunma	Kanto	Tonan Maebashi; Bunnys Gunma FC White Star	1966
44		Chubu Yajin Stadium	7,390	Yonago, Tottori	Chugoku	Gainare Tottori	2012
45		Ajinomoto Field Nishigaoka	7,258	Kita, Tokyo	Kantō		1977
46		Fujitsu Stadium Kawasaki	6,000	Kawasaki, Kanagawa	Kanto		2001
47		Takaragaike Ball Game Field	6,000	Kyoto city, Kyoto	Kansai	Kyoto Purple Sanga FC	
48		Koga Football Field	6,000	Koga, Ibaraki	Kanto		
49		Shimane Football Arena	6,000	Masuda, Shimane	Chugoku	FC Kagura Shimane	1978
50		Oyasato Rugby Stadium	5,800	Tenri, Nara	Kansai	Tenri University	1984
51		Ishinomaki Football Ground	5,650	Ishinomaki, Miyagi	Tōhoku	Sony Sendai FC	
52		Hawaiians Stadium Iwaki	5,600	Iwaki, Fukushima	Tōhoku	Iwaki FC	1995
53		Tokushima City Field	5,600	Tokushima city, Tokushima	Shikoku	Otsuka Pharmaceutical SC	1933
54		Fuji Hokuroku Playing Field	5,600	Fujiyoshida, Yamanashi	Chubu		1985
55		Unilever Stadium Shintomi	5,354	Shintomi, Miyazaki	Kyushu	Tegevajaro Miyazaki	
56		ASICS Satoyama Stadium	5,316	Imabari, Ehime	Shikoku	FC Imabari	
57		Prifoods Stadium	5,200	Hachinohe, Aomori	Tōhoku	Vanraure Hachinohe	2016
58		City Football Station	5,129	Tochigi, Tochigi	Kanto	Tochigi City FC	2021
59		Nipro Hachiko Dome	5,040	Odate, Akita	Tohoku	Blaublitz Akita	1997
60		Kawasaki Heavy Industries Stadium	5,030	Kakamigahara, Gifu	Chubu		2000
61		Arigato Service Dream Stadium	5,030	Imabari, Ehime	Chubu	FC Imabari (2017–2023)	2017
62		Aomori Prefecture Football Centre	5,000	Towada, Aomori	Tohoku		2008
63		Coop Miyagi Megumino Football Field B	5,000	Rifu, Miyagi	Tōhoku	Sony Sendai FC	1988
64		J-Village Stadium	5,000	Hirono, Fukushima	Tōhoku	Iwaki FC (2022); TEPCO Mareeze	1993
65		Kirara Expo Park	5,000	Yamaguchi, Yamaguchi	Chugoku	Renofa Yamaguchi	2002
66		Mimasaka Rugby Football Field	5,000	Mimasaka, Okayama	Chugoku	Okayama Yunogo Belle	1988
67		Nogihama Park	5,000	Shimonoseki, Yamaguchi	Chugoku		2002
68		Akigin Stadium	5,000	Akita city, Akita	Tōhoku	Blaublitz Akita; Saruta Kōgyō S.C. [tl]	1953
69		Iwagin Stadium	5,000	Morioka, Iwate	Tōhoku	Iwate Grulla Morioka	
70		Toko Playing Fields	5,000	Asahikawa, Hokkaido	Hokkaido		
71		Mochigase Sports Park Multi-purpose Square	5,000	Tottori, Tottori	Chugoku		

== Defunct stadiums ==
#	Image	Stadium	Capacity	City	Region	Home team(s)	Opened	Closed
1		Meiji Jingu Gaien Stadium	65,000	Shinjuku	Kantō		1924	1956
2		National Stadium	48,000	Shinjuku	Kantō		1958	2014
3		Osaka City Ground	27,000	Minato, Osaka	Kansai		1923	1964
4		Aomori Athletics Park Stadium	17,000	Aomori, Aomori	Tōhoku	ReinMeer Aomori	1966	
5		Kobe Central Football Stadium	13,000	Kobe, Hyogo	Kansai	Vissel Kobe	1970	1998
6		Medeshima Stadium	10,323	Natori, Miyagi	Tōhoku	NEC Tokin; Sendai Nakada SC	1992	2018
7		Paloma Mizuho Stadium	27,000	Nagoya, Aichi	Chūbu	Nagoya Grampus (select matches)	1947	2021
8		Yamagata City Athletics Stadium	9,000	Yamagata, Yamagata	Tōhoku	NEC Yamagata (-1995)	1979	

== See also ==
- List of stadiums in Japan
- List of Asian stadiums by capacity
- List of association football stadiums by capacity
- List of association football stadiums by country
- List of sports venues by capacity
- Lists of stadiums
- Football in Japan
