= Sankyo Frontier Kashiwa Stadium =

Football stadium in Kashiwa, Japan

- Hitachidai
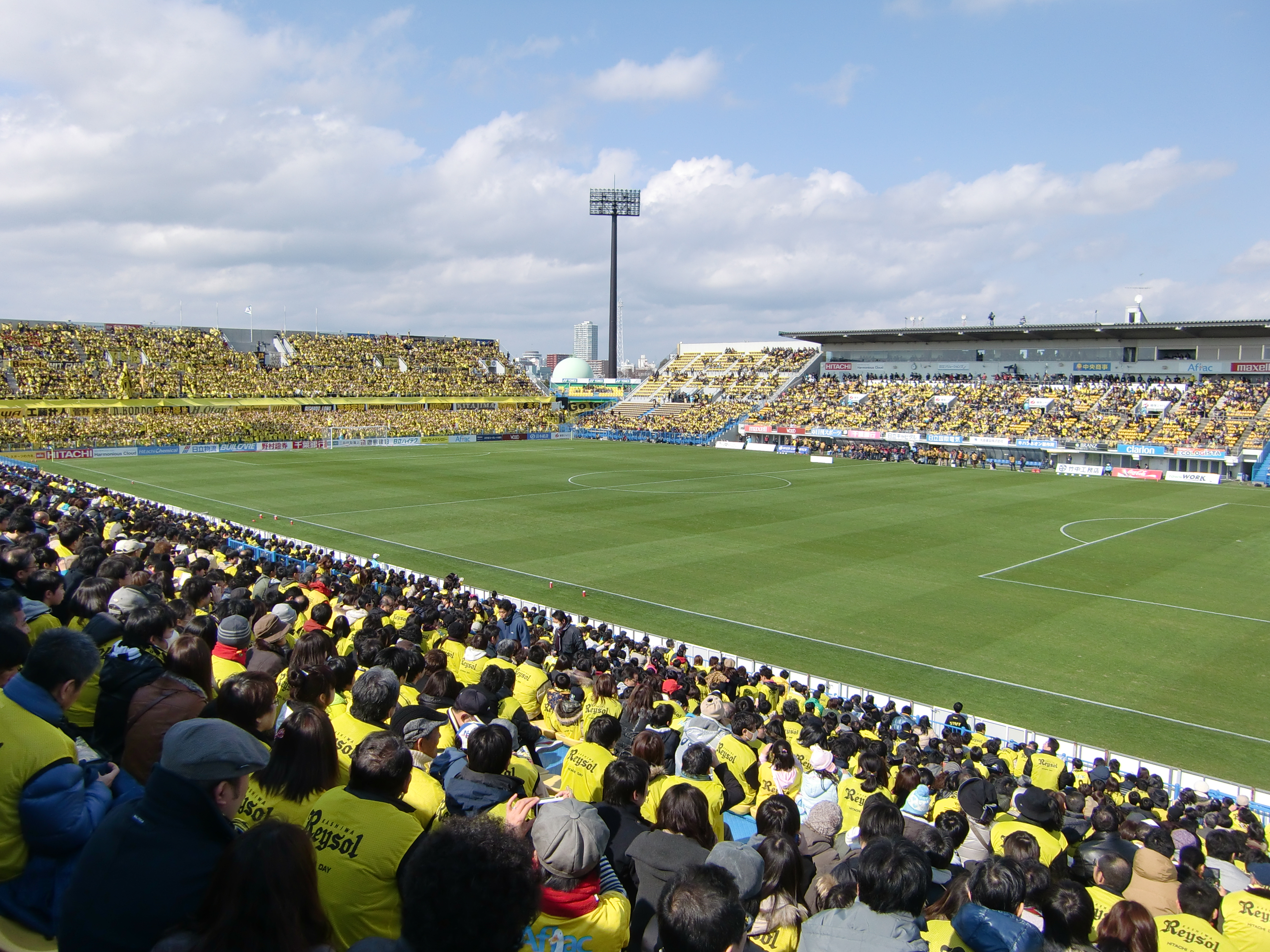
- Interactive map of Sankyo Frontier Kashiwa Stadium
- Former names: Hitachi Kashiwa Stadium (1985–2018)
- Location: Kashiwa, Chiba, Japan
- Coordinates: 35°50′55″N 139°58′31″E
- Owner: Hitachi
- Capacity: 15,349
- Surface: Grass
- Field size: 105 x 68 m
- Public transit: JR East: Joban Line at Kashiwa; Tobu Railway: Tobu Urban Park Line at Kashiwa

Construction
- Opened: 1985
- Renovated: 1995

Tenant
- Kashiwa Reysol

The Sankyo Frontier Kashiwa Stadium (三協フロンテア柏スタジアム) is a football stadium in Kashiwa, Chiba, Japan. It serves as the home ground of the J1 League club Kashiwa Reysol. The stadium holds 15,349 people and was built in 1985.

The stadium is owned by Hitachi and also known as Hitachi Kashiwa Stadium (日立柏サッカー場). In February 2018, a naming rights deal was signed and the stadium was renamed Sankyo Frontier Kashiwa Stadium until 2020.

== See also ==
- Lists of stadiums
- List of football stadiums in Japan
- List of stadiums in Japan
