= Denka Big Swan Stadium =

Stadium in Niigata, Japan

- Niigata Stadium, Big Swan
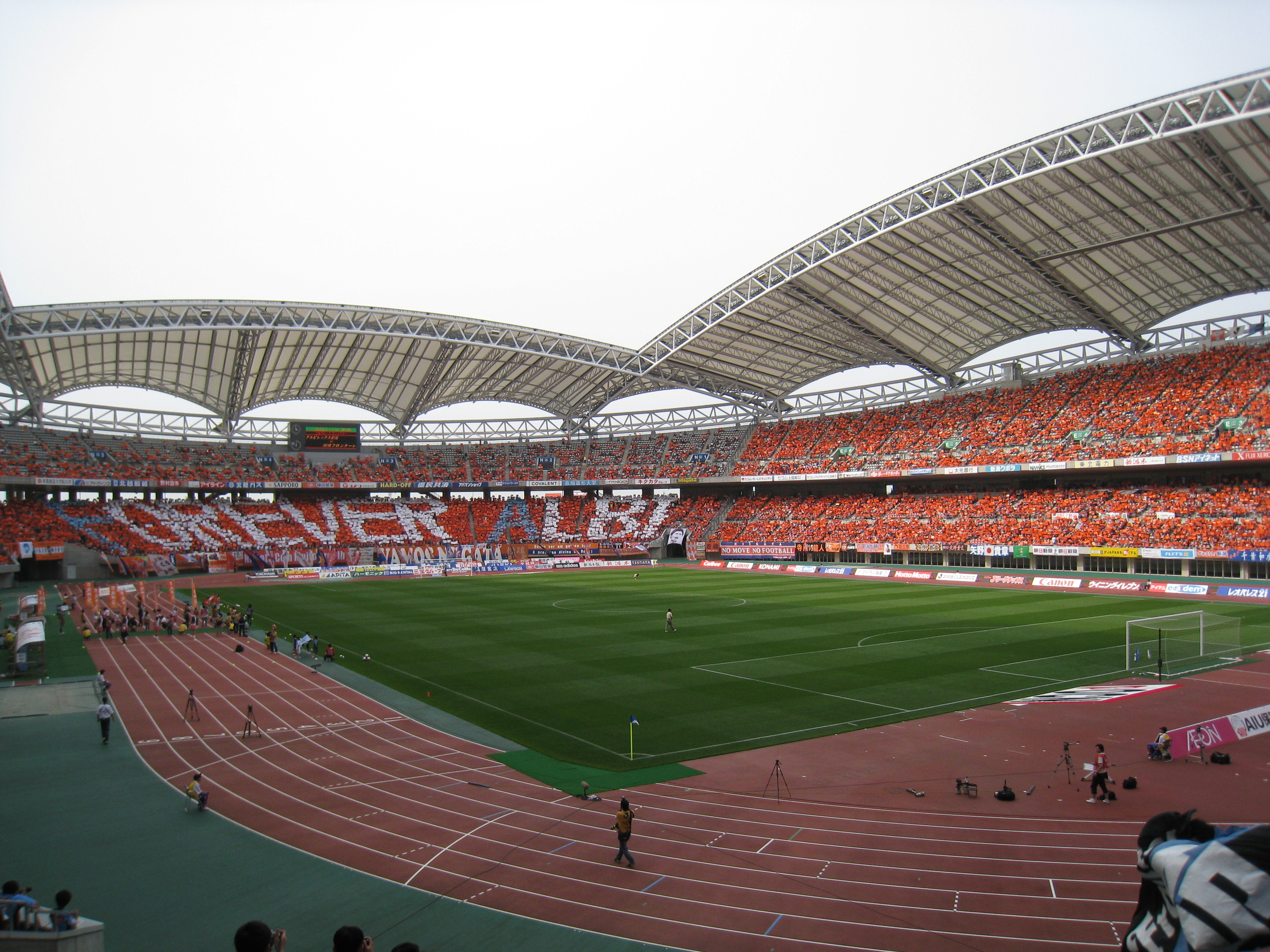
- Interactive map of Denka Big Swan Stadium
- Full name: Denka Big Swan Stadium
- Former names: Niigata Stadium (2001–2007); Tohoku Denryoku Big Swan Stadium (2007–2013)
- Location: Niigata, Japan
- Coordinates: 37°52′57″N 139°03′33″E
- Owner: Niigata Prefecture
- Operator: Albirex Niigata
- Capacity: 41,684
- Surface: Grass
- Record attendance: 42,223 (Albirex Niigata vs Omiya Ardija, 23 November 2003)
- Field size: 107 x 72 m

Construction
- Groundbreaking: November 1997
- Opened: April 29, 2001

Tenants
- Albirex Niigata (2001–present); Japan national football team (select matches)

The Denka Big Swan Stadium (デンカビッグスワンスタジアム, Denka Biggu Suwan Sutajiamu) is a multi-purpose stadium in Niigata, Japan. It is the home ground of J1 League club Albirex Niigata and was one of the twenty stadia used in the 2002 FIFA World Cup, hosting three matches.

The stadium's capacity is 41,684. The highest recorded attendance at the stadium was Albirex Niigata's home fixture against Omiya Ardija on 23 November 2003, the final day of the 2003 J. League Division 2, with 42,223 fans attending.

== Naming history ==
In 2007, Tohoku Electric Power bought the naming rights to the Niigata Stadium for ¥120 million/year, retitling the stadium as the "Tohoku Denryoku Big Swan Stadium". In September 2013, Denki Kagaku Kogyo (Denka) bought the naming rights for ¥70 million/year, and the stadium was rebranded as the "Denka Big Swan Stadium" in a 3-year deal.

== Rugby ==
The stadium also sometimes hosts rugby union Top League games and on May 18, 2008, Japan played Hong Kong here in the 2008 Asian Five Nations.

== 2002 FIFA World Cup ==
Niigata Stadium hosted 3 matches in the 2002 FIFA World Cup.

| Date | Team #1 | Result | Team #2 | Round | Attendance |
|---|---|---|---|---|---|
| 1 June 2002 | Republic of Ireland | 1–1 | Cameroon | Group E | 33,679 |
| 3 June 2002 | Croatia | 0–1 | Mexico | Group G | 32,239 |
| 15 June 2002 | Denmark | 0–3 | England | Round of 16 | 40,582 |

== Access ==
Transit bus

There is a bus stop Big Swan-mae (ビッグスワン前), a minute walk away from the stadium. Transit bus operated by Niigata Kotsu S70, S71, S72 (line: S7) runs from Niigata Station South Exit.

== See also ==
- Niigata Prefectural Baseball Stadium
- List of football stadiums in Japan
- List of stadiums in Japan
- Lists of stadiums
