= Peace Stadium Connected by SoftBank =

Football stadium, home of V-Varen Nagasaki

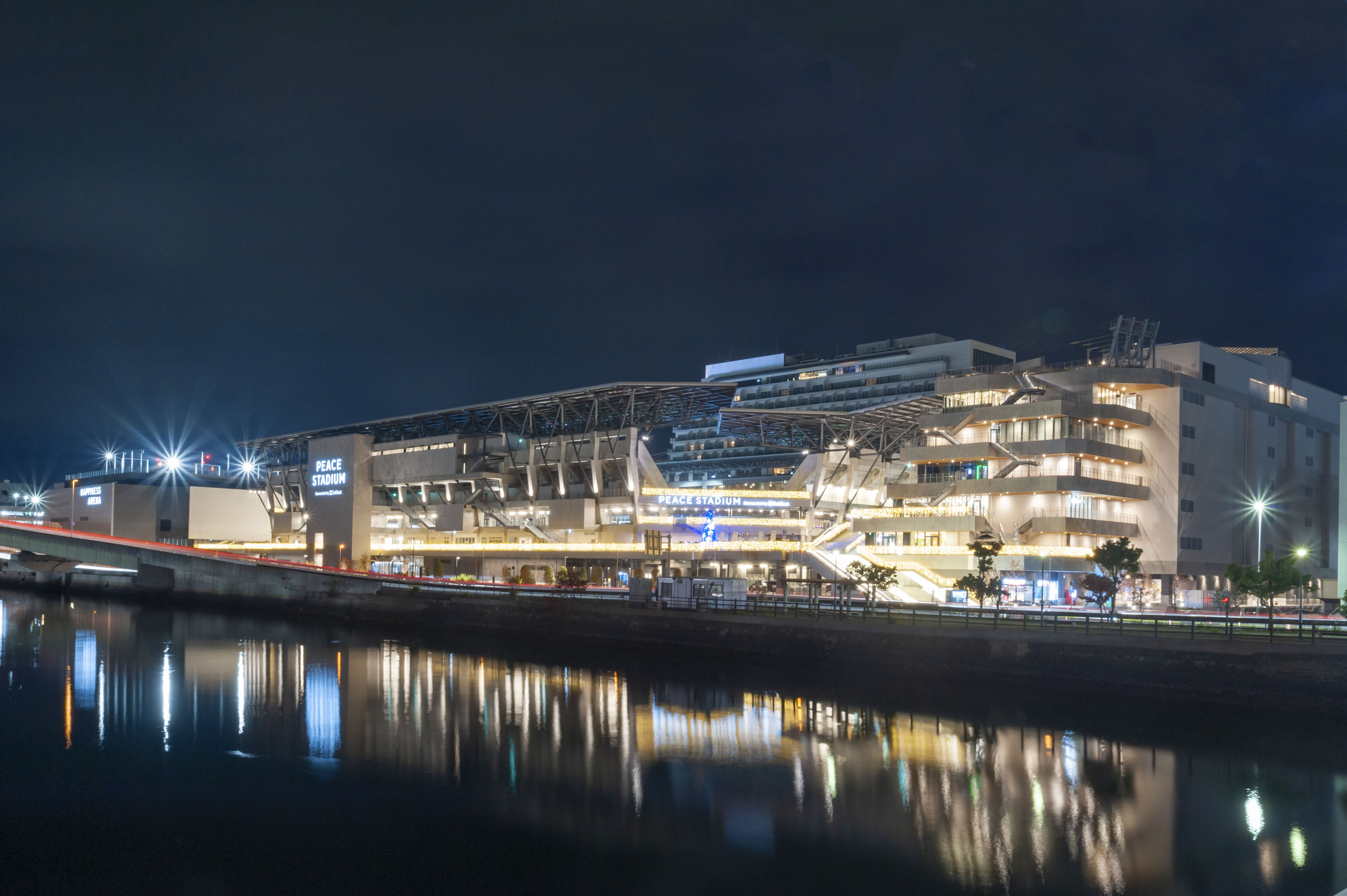
- View of the Peace Stadium from the Inasa Bridge
- Interactive map of Peace Stadium Connected by SoftBank
- Full name: Peace Stadium Connected by SoftBank
- Address: 7-1 Saiwaimachi, Nagasaki, Nagasaki Prefecture, 850-0046
- Location: Nagasaki, Japan
- Coordinates: 32°45′31.6″N 129°51′53.9″E
- Owner: Japanet Holdings
- Operator: Regional Creation Nagasaki
- Seating type: Stadium seating
- Capacity: 20,027
- Type: Stadium
- Event: Sporting events
- Surface: Grass
- Record attendance: 20,001 (V-Varen Nagasaki–Vegalta Sendai, 1 December 2024)
- Public transit: JR Kyushu: Nishi Kyushu Shinkansen; Nagasaki Main Line at Nagasaki Station or Urakami Station; Nagasaki Electric Tramway: Stadium City North; Stadium City South

Construction
- Groundbreaking: 26 June 2022; 4 years ago
- Built: June 2022–September 2024
- Opened: 14 October 2024; 2 years ago
- Cost: Approx. ¥100 billion (US$631.65 million) for construction of full Nagasaki Stadium City site
- Architects: Environmental Design Institute; Yasui Architects & Engineers Joint Venture
- Main contractor: Takenaka Corporation

Tenant
- V-Varen Nagasaki

Website
- Peace Stadium website

Peace Stadium Connected by SoftBank (ピーススタジアム コネクテッド バイ ソフトバンク) is a football stadium in Nagasaki, Japan, which has a seating capacity of 20,027. It has been the home of V-Varen Nagasaki since 2024.

== History ==
In April 2017, Mitsubishi Heavy Industries Ltd. issued a call for proposals for the redevelopment of the former Saiwaimachi Factory site at the Nagasaki Shipyard & Machinery Works. As part of the proposal, they sought concepts aimed at enhancing Nagasaki, by creating new lifestyles and job opportunities in the city while bringing their three pillars of "living, working, and leisure" to life. They were also looking for the land to be used as a leading hub for "smart and sustainable" urban development.

The proposal received tenders from JR Kyushu who were looking to extend Nagasaki Station, Japan's largest homebuilders, Daiwa House and Japanet Holdings who were looking to build a stadium for their recently acquired team, V-Varen Nagasaki.

In April 2018, Japanet Holdings Group, a joint venture of Japanet Holdings, JLL real estate, and general contractors Takenaka Corporation were awarded first refusal for the redevelopment of the site. Their proposal was to build the world's first urban development centred around a stadium, with the overall concept of "the joy of living in Nagasaki". In November 2018, a real estate purchase was signed, and the land was officially acquired by Japanet Holdings.

In March 2020, the plans were unveiled that the "Nagasaki Stadium City" site would not only include the stadium, but also a hotel, offices, commercial buildings and a 6,000-seat multi-sport facility. The land was handed over in March 2021, and the groundbreaking ceremony took place on 26 June 2022.

The construction took two years to complete at a cost of approximately ¥100 billion (US$631.65 million), and a completion ceremony was held on 6 September 2024.

On 6 October 2024, V-Varen Nagasaki played their first game at the new stadium, winning their league game 4–1 against Oita Trinita. The recorded attendance was 19,011, which was the second highest in the club's history.

Nagasaki-born singer Masaharu Fukuyama performed a free concert on 13 October 2024 as part of the stadium's opening ceremony events, the day before the grand opening ceremony itself. Around 1,000 people were involved in a ribbon-cutting relay covering 5km across the whole Stadium City site.

== Structure and facilities ==
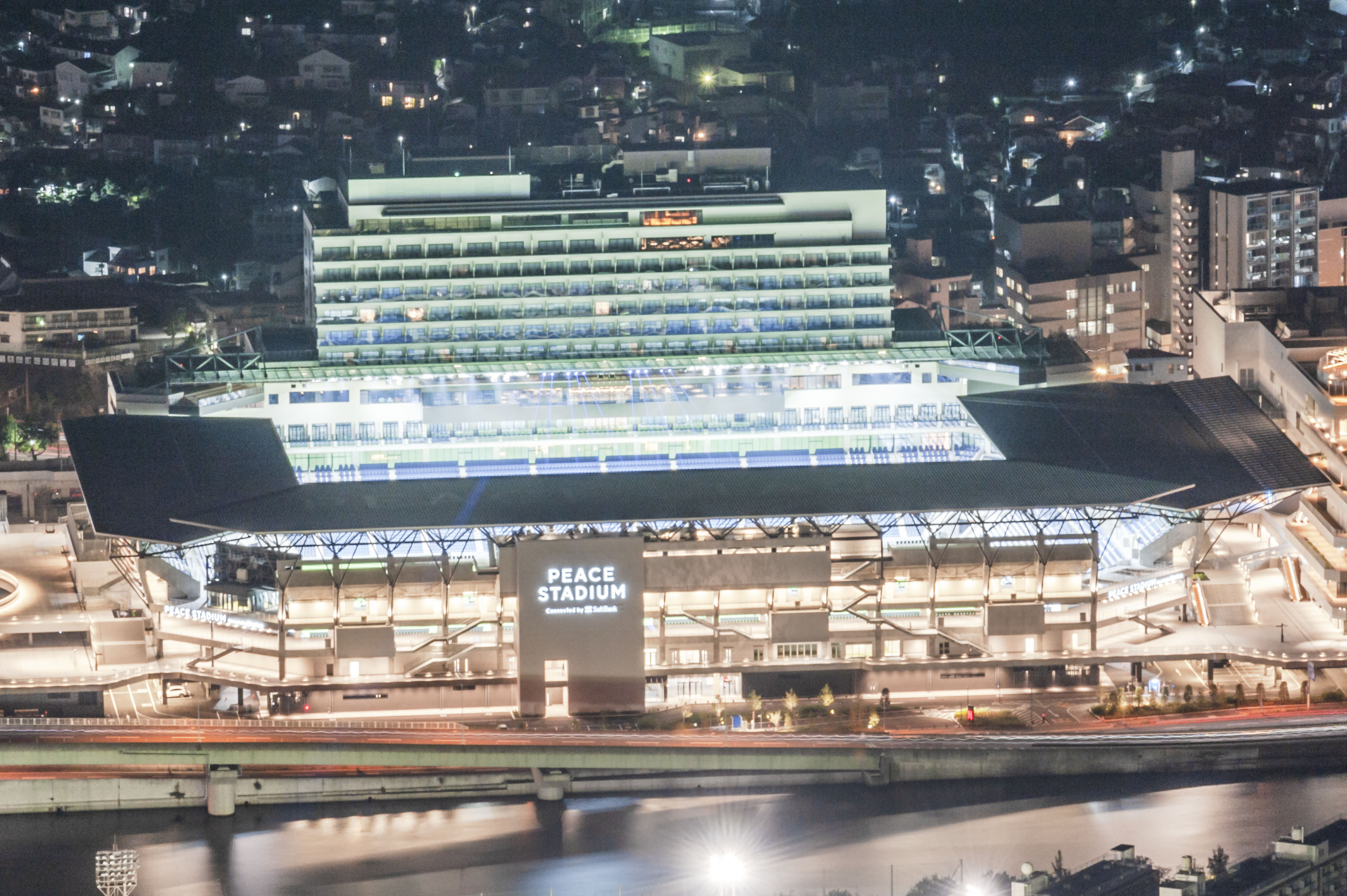
Stadium as seen from the Mt.Inasa

The stadium itself sits in an area of approximately 35,000m² and has a seating capacity of 20,027. It is rectangular in shape and consists of a reinforced concrete structure with a steel roof and stands six floors tall, reaching a height of approximately 28 meters. The roof covers all the seats in the stadium and is formed of four separate segments above each stand. The spectator seats are just 5 metres away from the pitch.

The seating follows a two-tiered design around the entire stadium, with the lower tier occupying the first to third floors and the upper tier spanning the fourth and fifth floors. The colours of the folding seats are deep blue and sky blue, with the design concept centred around peace.

=== Stands ===
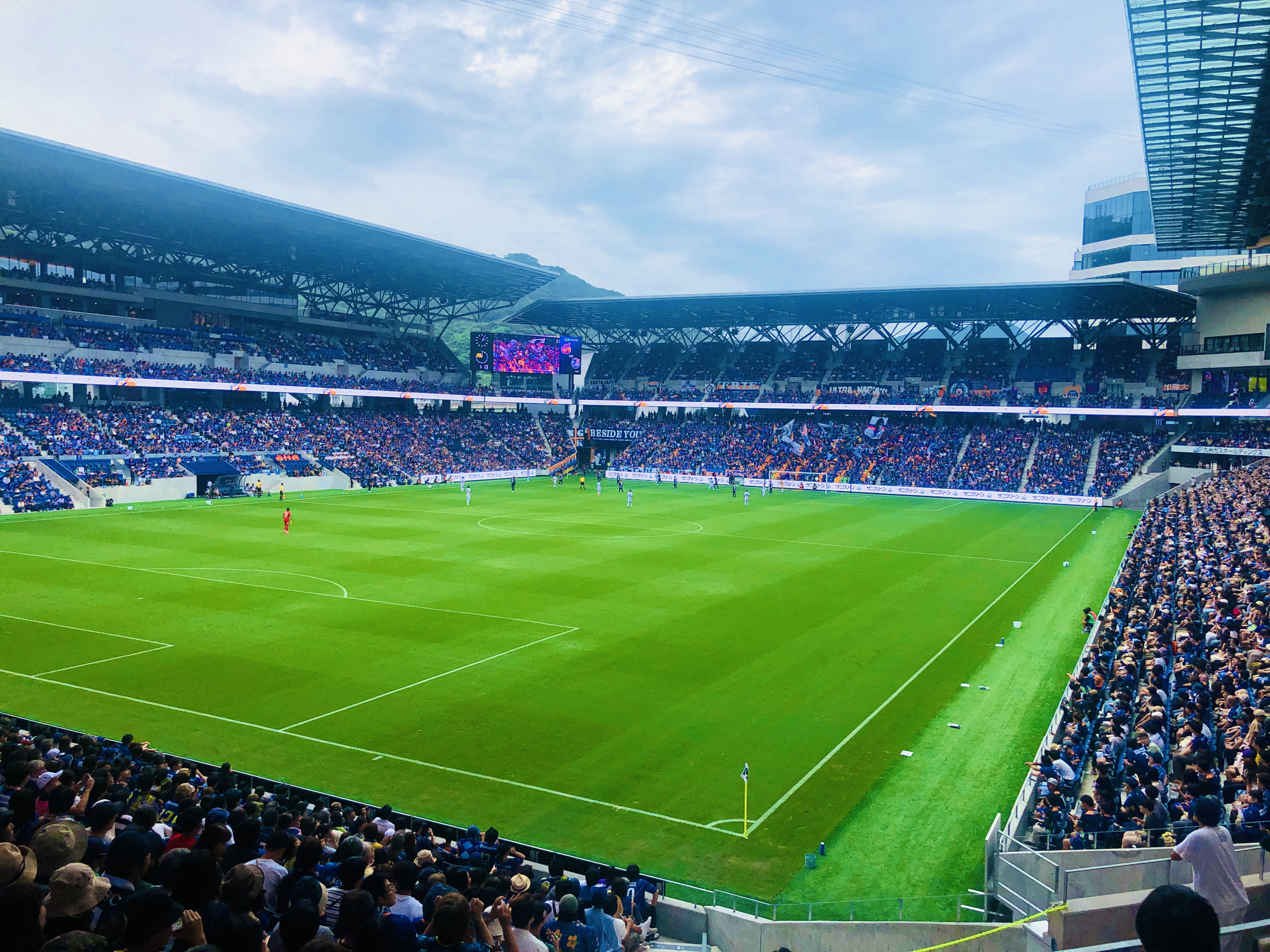
View of the pitch from the corner of the Peace stand

There are four stands in the stadium. The main stand on the west, Urakami River side, is the SoftBank stand named after the main sponsor. Behind the main stand are rooms for players and operations. Opposite is the Peace stand, which is integrated with the hotel building. The hotel extends along this stand, rising 14 above-ground floors to a height of approximately 60 meters. This is the first hotel built in Japan where it's possible to watch a live football game from your room or suite. Approximately 70% of the hotel's 243 rooms have a view of the pitch. Behind the home goal is the V-Varen stand and behind the visitors goal is the Welcome stand. The players seats are recessed into the main stand.

Behind the Peace, V-Varen and Welcome stands a parking lot on the first floor, a concourse with service functions such as a food hall with restaurants and toilets on the second floor and a concourse that circles the whole stadium on the third floor.

There is a canopy in the eastern section, facing the hotel which is made of glass, while in the southern section, it extends outward to cover the passage between the stadium and the shopping mall.

There are large screens in the northwest and southeast corners, and a broadcast studio is located under the screen on the northwest side.

=== Facilities ===
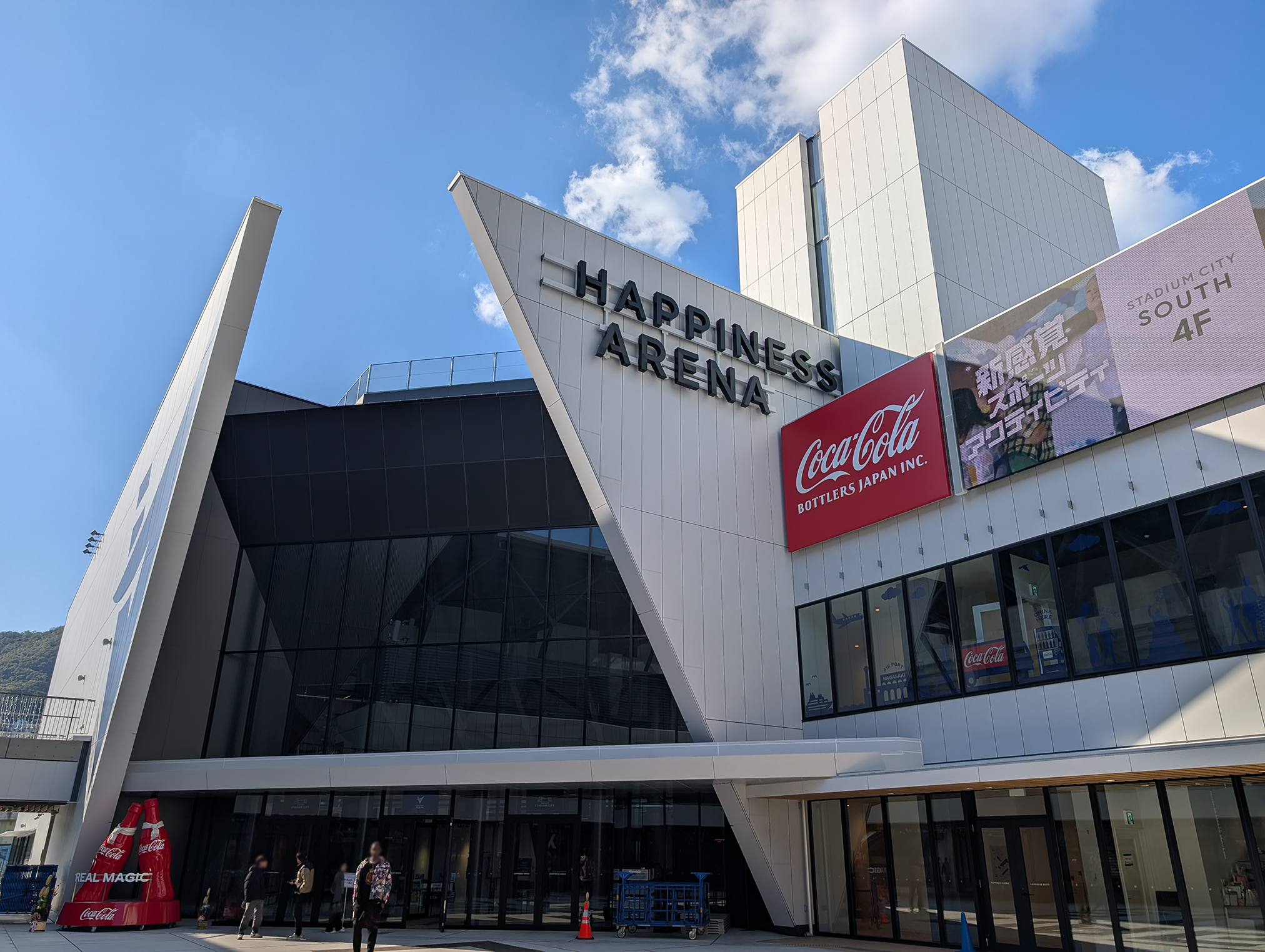
The Happiness Arena

The stadium was constructed as part of the wider Nagasaki Stadium City site, which includes a hotel, an office building, a commercial building and a 6,000-seat multi-sport facility called the Happiness Arena. There are large amount of retailers on the site for shopping, eating and drinking, relaxation and working.

There is also the opportunity to zipline above the stadium on non-match days.

There is a VIP area at the top of the main stand that consists of suites and terraces. There is also the 'Player's Suite' hospitality package, which consists of 124 premium seats and is as close as you can get to the players and the pitch on a matchday. This would also allow access to see the players enter the pitch through a glass screen and press conferences after the game.

== Naming rights ==
On 19 December 2022, Japanet Holdings announced they would be partnering with telecommunications agency SoftBank who would provide the ICT for the Nagasaki Stadium City site. In addition, SoftBank acquired naming rights to the stadium, confirming that the stadium name would be Peace Stadium Connected by SoftBank. The naming contract is for a period of five years, from February 2024 until January 2029.

== Transport ==
=== Train ===
- 10 minutes on foot from Nagasaki Station on the Nishi Kyushu Shinkansen or Nagasaki Main Line
- 8 minutes on foot from Urakami Station on the Nagasaki Main Line.

=== Bus ===
The following stops from the Nagasaki Bus serve the site:

- Saiwai-machi Nagasaki Stadium City (1-minute walk to Stadium City South entrance)
- Inasabashi (2-minute walk to Stadium City South entrance)
- Zenzamachi Nagasaki Stadium City (3-minute walk to Stadium City North entrance)
- Cocowalk Morimachi (5-minute walk to Stadium City North entrance)
- Takaramachi (6-minute walk to Stadium City South entrance)

=== Tram ===
- Nagasaki Electric Tramway: 6-minute walk from Stadium City South or 3-minute walk from Stadium City North.

== See also ==
- List of football stadiums in Japan
