= Fukui Prefectural Stadium =

Baseball stadium in Fukui, Japan

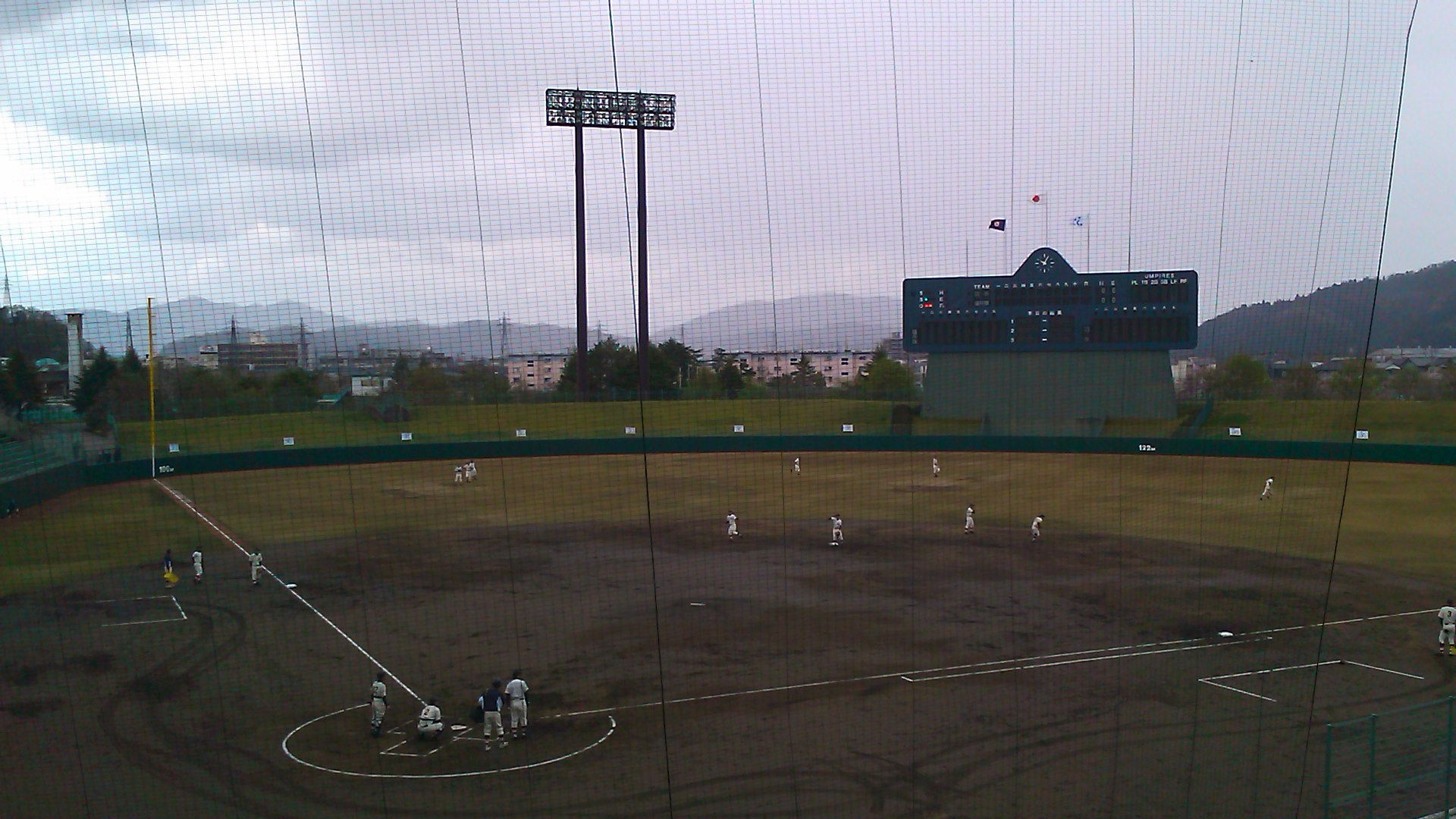
- Interactive map of Fukui Prefectural Stadium
- Location: Fukui, Fukui Prefecture, Japan
- Coordinates: 36°3′5.4″N 136°10′57.7″E
- Owner: Fukui Prefecture
- Operator: Fukui Prefecture
- Capacity: 22,000

Construction
- Groundbreaking: 1967
- Built: August 9, 1967

Tenant
- Fukui Miracle Elephants

Fukui Prefectural Stadium (福井県営球場) is a baseball stadium in Fukui, Fukui Prefecture, Japan opened on August 9, 1967. It is primarily used for baseball and is the home of the Fukui Miracle Elephants.
