= Hofu Sports Center Athletic Field =

Athletic stadium in Hōfu, Yamaguchi, Japan

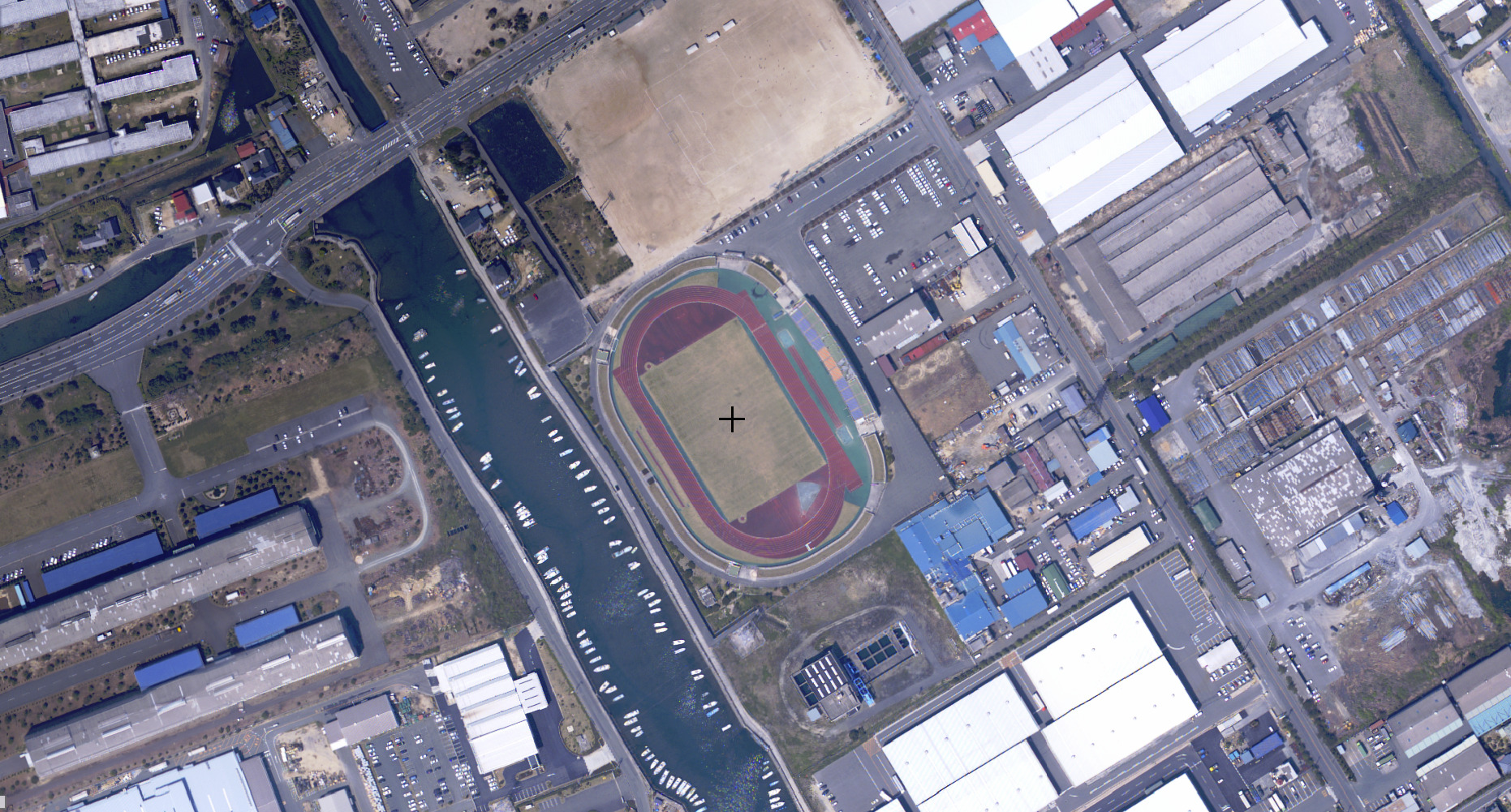
- Interactive map of Hofu Sports Center Athletic Field
- Location: Hōfu, Yamaguchi, Japan
- Coordinates: 34°1′11.9″N 131°34′13.2″E
- Owner: Hōfu City
- Capacity: 6,000

Hofu Sports Center Athletic Field (防府市陸上競技場, Hōfu-shi rikujō kyōgiba) is an athletic stadium in Hōfu, Yamaguchi, Japan.
