= Nagasaki City Kakidomari Stadium =

Athletic stadium in Nagasaki, Japan

- 長崎市総合運動公園かきどまり陸上競技場
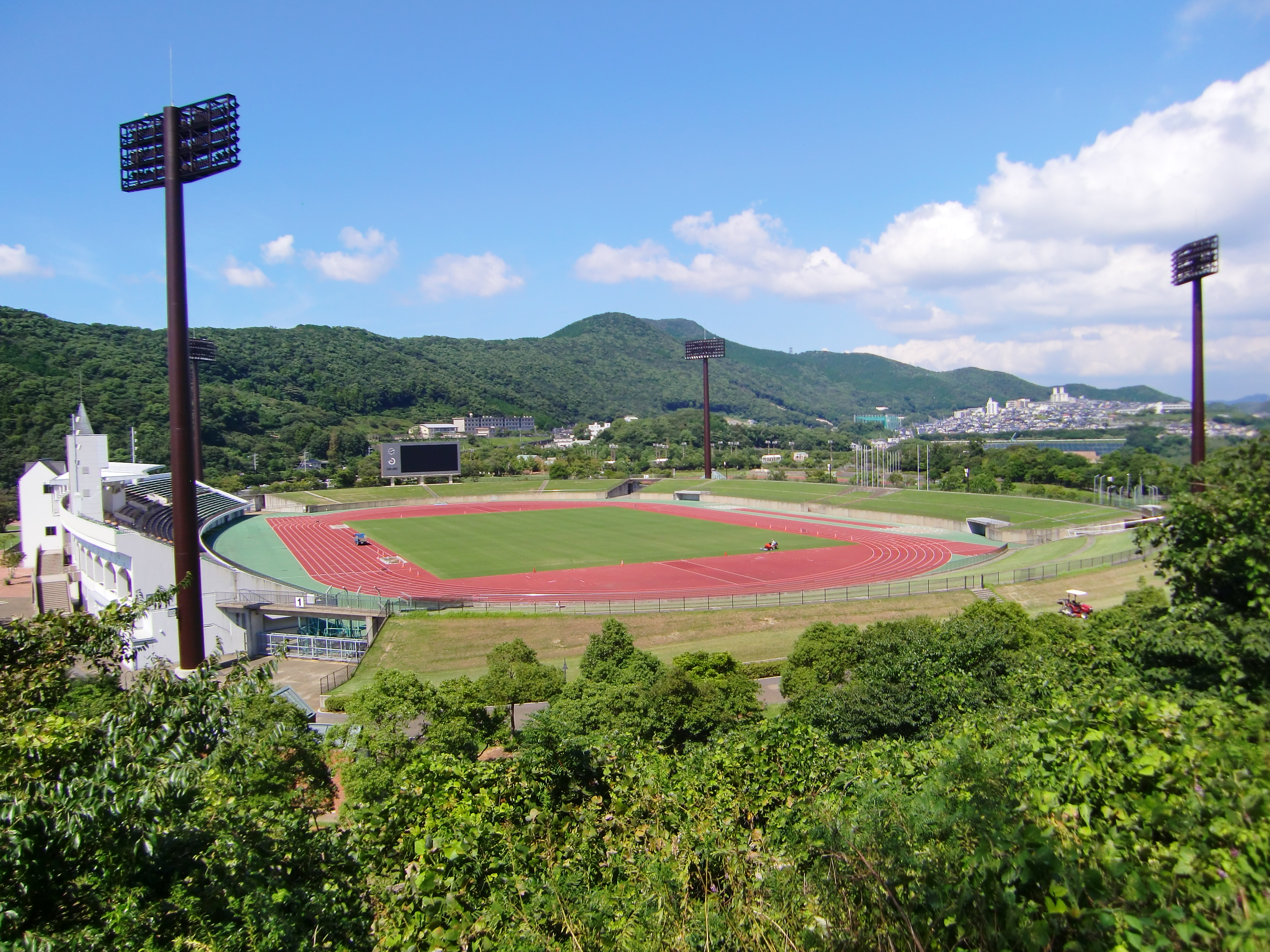
- Interactive map of Nagasaki City Kakidomari Stadium
- Location: Nagasaki, Nagasaki, Japan
- Coordinates: 32.7724°N 129.8173°E
- Owner: Nagasaki City
- Capacity: 16,000

Website
- Official site

Nagasaki City Kakidomari Stadium (長崎市総合運動公園かきどまり陸上競技場) is an athletic stadium in Nagasaki, Nagasaki, Japan.

It was one of the home stadiums of football club V-Varen Nagasaki.
