= Fuji Hokuroku Stadium =

Stadium in Yamanashi Prefecture, Japan

Coordinates: 35°27′15″N 138°46′05″E

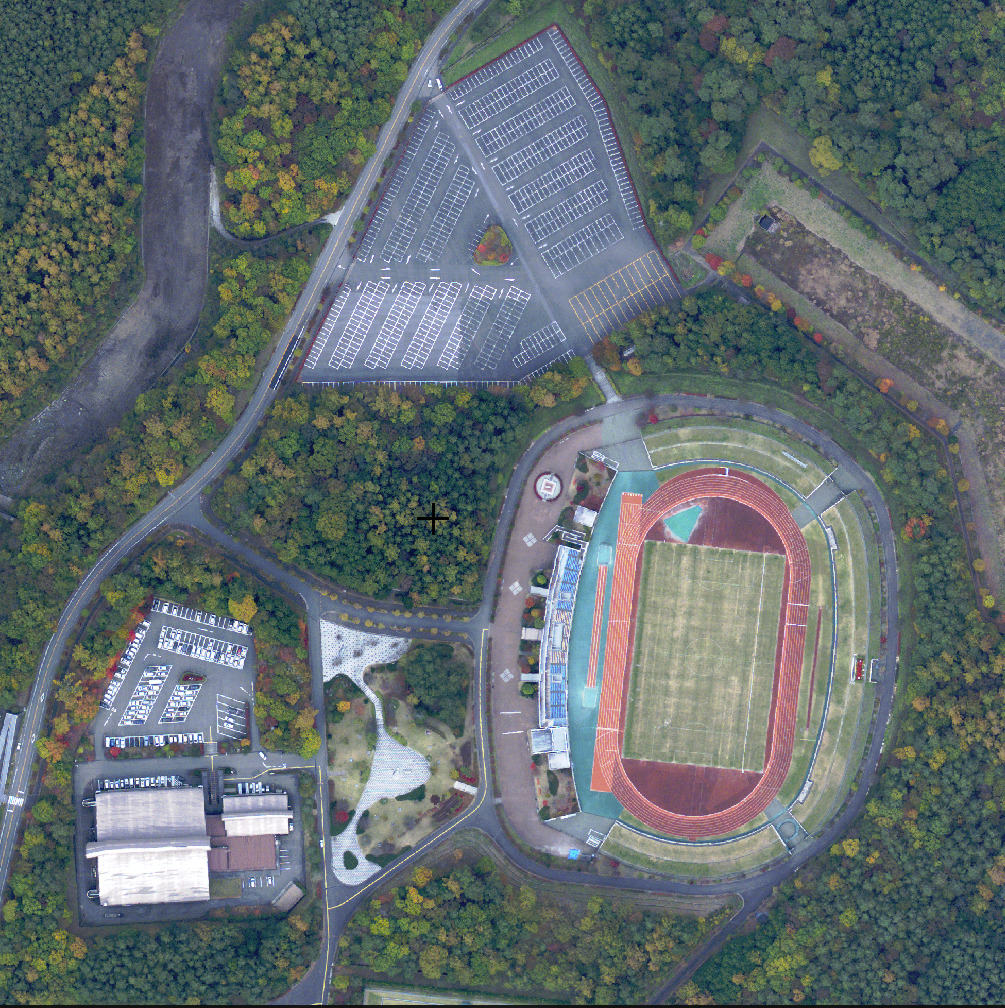
- Interactive map of Fuji Hokuroku Stadium
- Location: Fujiyoshida, Yamanashi, Japan
- Owner: Yamanashi Prefecture
- Capacity: 11,105

Construction
- Opened: 1985

Tenant
- Ventforet Kofu

Fuji Hokuroku Playing Field Baseball Stadium
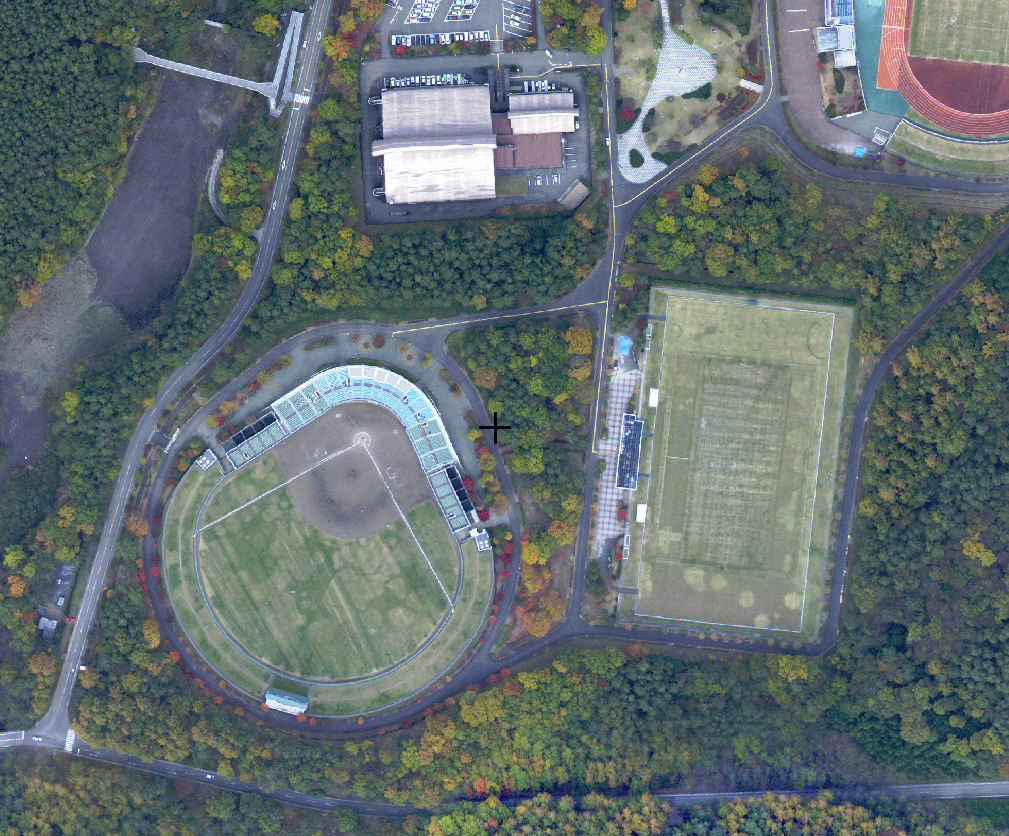
- Interactive map of Fuji Hokuroku Playing Field; Baseball Stadium
- Capacity: Playing Field:5,600; Baseball stadium:13,449

Fuji Hokuroku Stadium (富士北麓競技場) is an athletic stadium in Fujiyoshida, Yamanashi, Japan.

It was one of the home stadium of football club Ventforet Kofu in 2000.
