= Tsuyama Stadium =

Athletic stadium in Tsuyama, Okayama, Japan

- 岡山県津山陸上競技場
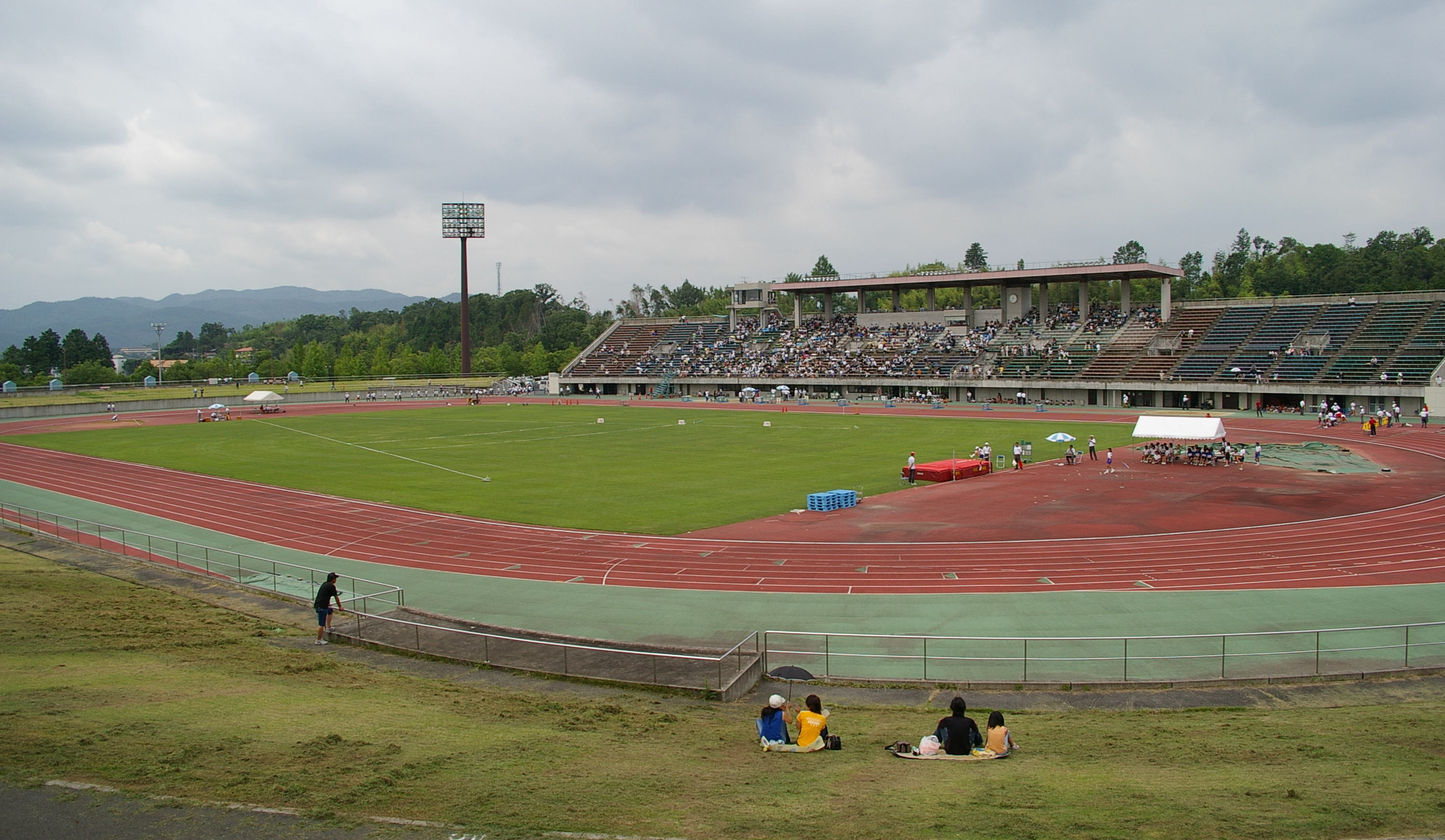
- Interactive map of Tsuyama Stadium
- Location: Tsuyama, Okayama, Japan
- Coordinates: 35.0824°N 134.0182°E
- Owner: Okayama Prefecture
- Capacity: 10,000

Construction
- Opened: 1994

Tenant
- Fagiano Okayama (2008-2012)

Tsuyama Stadium (岡山県津山陸上競技場) is an athletic stadium in Tsuyama, Okayama, Japan.

It was one of the home stadiums of football club Fagiano Okayama.
