= Baycom Stadium =

Stadium in Amagasaki, Japan

Coordinates: 34°43′49″N 135°25′19″E

Amagasaki Memorial Park Stadium
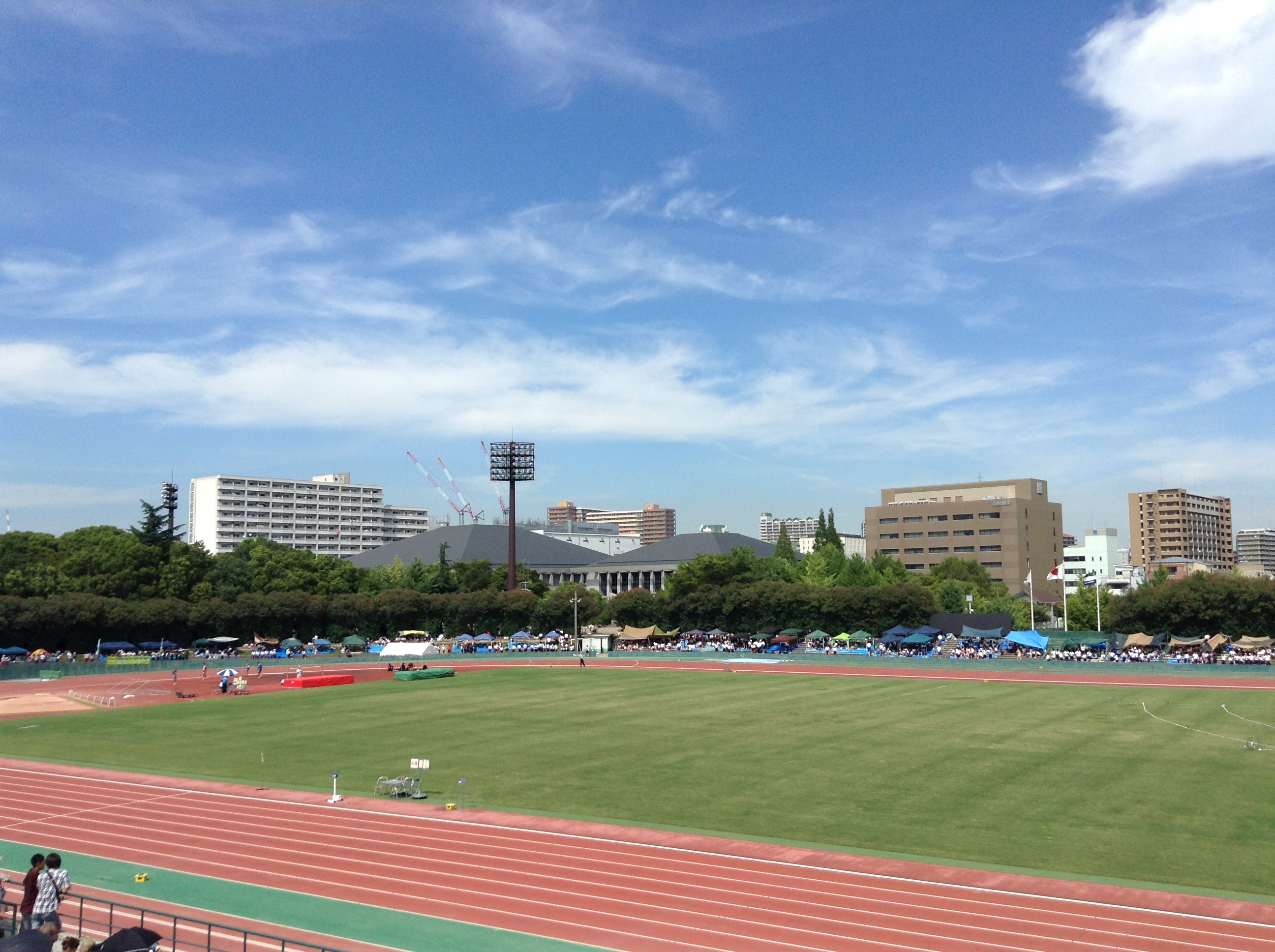
- Interactive map of Amagasaki Memorial Park Stadium
- Location: Amagasaki, Hyogo, Japan
- Owner: Amagasaki City
- Capacity: 10,000

Tenant
- Yanmar Diesel SC

Amagasaki Memorial Park Stadium is an athletic stadium in Amagasaki, Hyogo, Japan.
