= Kishiro Stadium =

Athletic stadium in Akashi, Hyōgo, Japan

Coordinates: 34°39′13″N 134°59′21″E

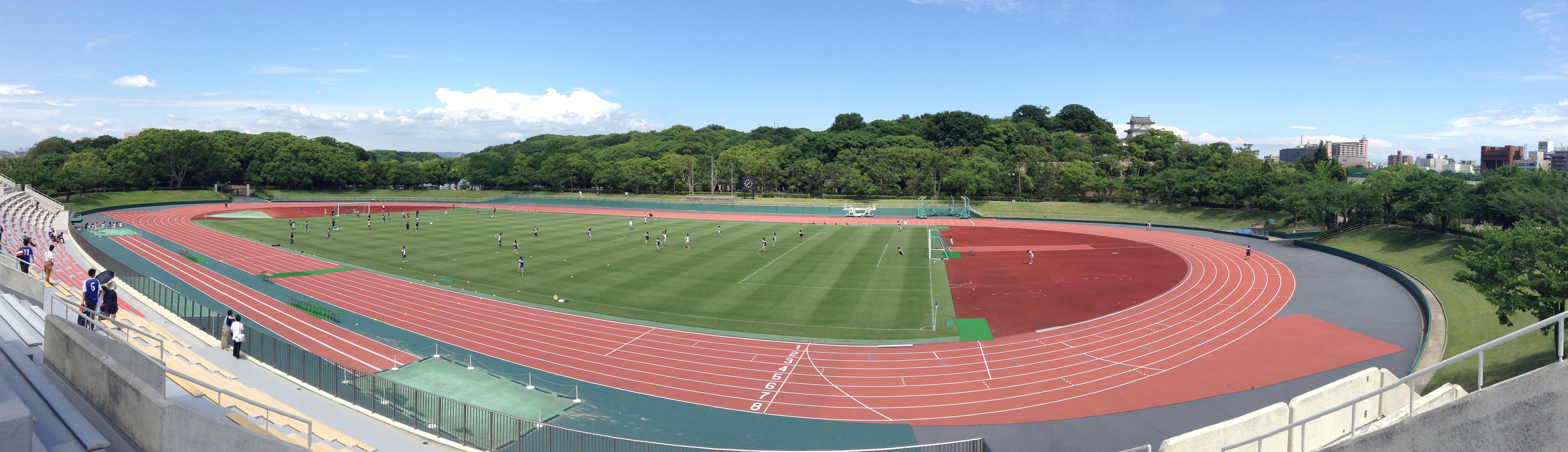
- Interactive map of Kishiro Stadium
- Former names: Asada Stadium

Akashi Park Stadium is a track and field and association football stadium located in Akashi Park, in Akashi, Hyōgo Prefecture in Japan. The Kishiro Stadium has a capacity of 20,000.
