= Hamamatsu Football Stadium =

Football stadium in Hamamatsu, Shizuoka, Japan

Coordinates: 34.668598°N 137.745359°E

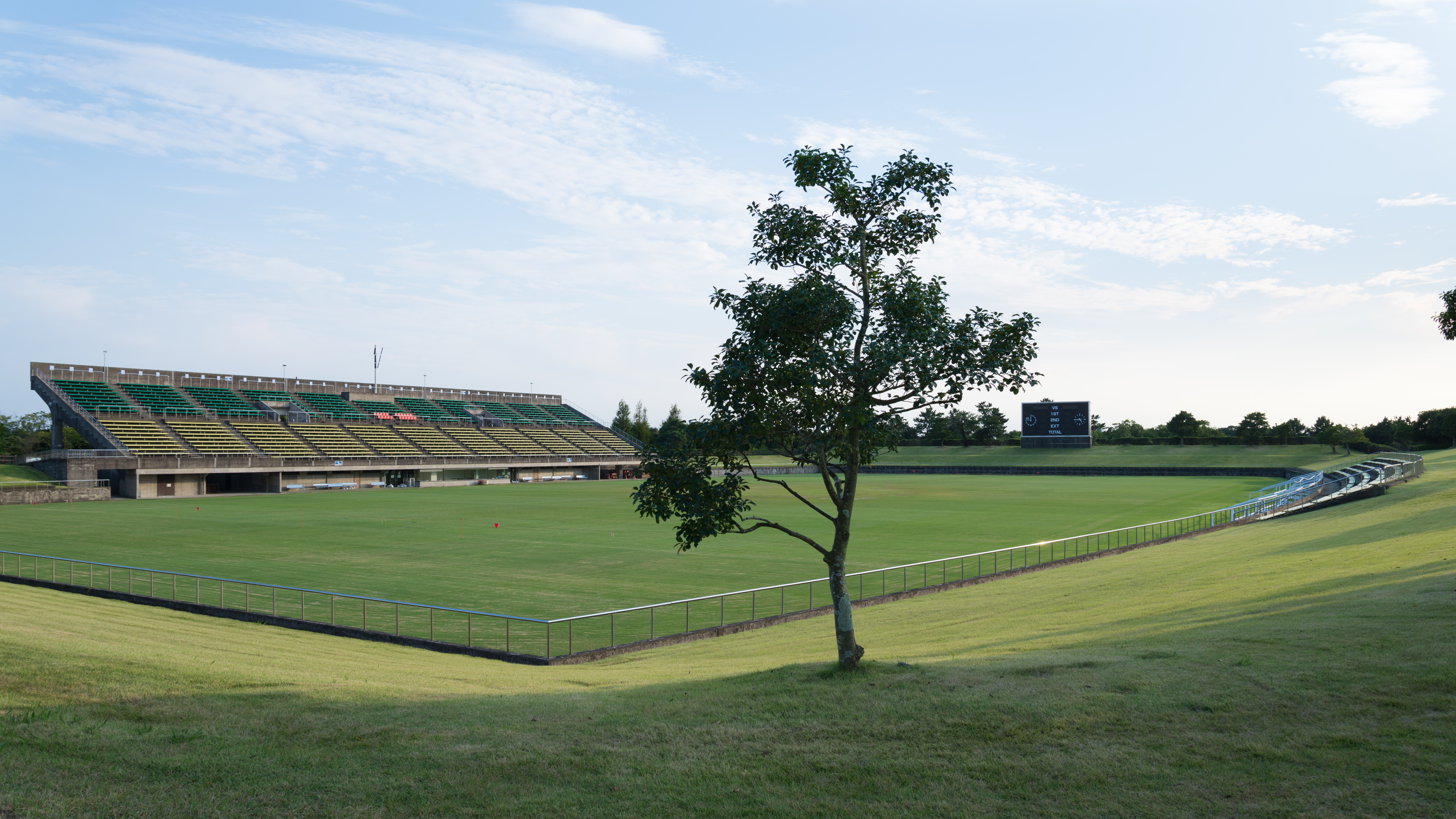
- Interactive map of Hamamatsu Football Stadium
- Location: Hamamatsu, Shizuoka, Japan
- Owner: Shizuoka Prefecture
- Capacity: 12,500

Hamamatsu Football Stadium (県営浜松球技場) is a football stadium in Hamamatsu, Shizuoka, Japan, run by Shizuoka Prefecture located in Enshu-nada Seaside Park, a prefectural city park in Minami Ward. It is also known as Sekijin no Hoshi Park Stadium or Hamamatsu Prefectural Stadium.

== Overview ==
Enshu-nada Seaside Park is a prefectural park located near the Magome River in Nakatajima-cho and Enoshima-cho, Hamamatsu City, where it flows into the Enshu Sea, and the Nakatajima sand dunes on the south side are a spawning ground for loggerhead sea turtles. The Football Stadium was established in October 1988 as a sports base for the western part of Shizuoka Prefecture in the Nakatajima Kita district (commonly known as "Ishijin Hoshi Park"), near the confluence of the Magome River and the Yoshi River in the park. Tenryu Landscape Construction Group has been in charge of management and operation as the designated manager since 2006.
