= Tohoku Soccer League =

- Founded: 1977; 49 years ago
- Country: Japan
- Confederation: AFC
- Divisions: 2
- Number of clubs: Div 1: 10; Div 2 North: 8 Div 2 South: 8
- Level on pyramid: 5–6
- Promotion to: Japan Football League
- Relegation to: Prefectural Leagues
- Domestic cup: Emperor's Cup
- Current champions: D1: Blancdieu Hirosaki; D2N: Bogolle D. Tsugaru; D2S: FC La U. de Sendai Second (2023)
- Most championships: TDK SC (11 times)
- Website: Official TFA Website
- Current: 2026 Japanese Regional Leagues

Tohoku Sоccer League (東北社会人サッカーリーグ, Tōhoku Shakaijin Sakkā Rīgu) is the Japanese fifth tier of league football, which is part of the Japanese Regional Leagues.

== History ==
It covers most of the Tōhoku region and the 6 prefectures of Akita, Aomori, Fukushima, Iwate, Miyagi and Yamagata. It is one of the nine Japanese Regional Leagues, the fifth and sixth league levels in the Japanese association football league system.

Division 2 is divided into North (Akita, Aomori and Iwate Prefectures) and South (Fukushima, Miyagi and Yamagata Prefectures) divisions.

== 2026 clubs ==
=== Division 1 ===
#	Team	Hometown	Notes
1	Blancdieu Hirosaki	Hirosaki, Aomori	
2	Bogolle D. Tsugaru (ja)	Tsugaru, Aomori	Promoted from Division 2 North as champions.
3	Cobaltore Onagawa	Onagawa, Miyagi	2025 Champions
4	Ganju Iwate	Hachimantai, Iwate	
5	Hitome Senbonzakura SUFT (ja)	Shibata, Miyagi	
6	Fukushima United FC Second	Iwanuma, Miyagi	Name changed from "Michinoku Sendai FC" Fukushima United FC's second team
7	Oyama Club	Tsuruoka, Yamagata	Promoted from Division 2 South as champions.
8	Shichigahama FC (ja)	Shichigahama, Miyagi	
9	Shichinohe SC (ja)	Shichinohe, Aomori	
10	FC La Universidad de Sendai	Sendai, Miyagi	

=== Division 2 North ===
#	Team	Hometown	Notes
1	Fuji Club 2003 (ja)	Hanamaki, Iwate	Relegated from Division 1.
2	Lideal Aomori (ja)	Hirosaki City, Aomori	Promoted as champions in the Aomori Prefecture League
3	Nippon Steel Kamaishi (ja)	Kamaishi, Iwate	
4	Nu Perle Hiraizumi-Maesawa (ja)	Hiraizumi, Iwate	
5	Omiya SC (ja)	Morioka, Iwate	
6	Oshu United (ja)	Ōshū, Iwate	The top teams in the Akita and Iwate prefecture leagues declined to participate in the entry match, so they remained
7	Saruta Kōgyō	Akita, Akita	
8	TDK Shinwakai (ja)	Nikaho, Akita	

=== Division 2 South ===
#	Team	Hometown	Notes
1	Iwaki Furukawa FC (ja)	Iwaki, Fukushima	
2	IRIS. F.C	Miyagi Prefecture	Promoted by winning in the Miyagi Prefecture League 1st place
3	Merry (football club) (ja)	Fukushima, Fukushima	
4	Parafrente Yonezawa (ja)	Yamagata	
5	Primeiro Fukushima (ja)	Koriyama, Fukushima	
6	Sendai Sasuke (ja)	Sendai, Miyagi	Relegated from Division 1
7	La U. de Sendai Second	Sendai, Miyagi	Reserve team from FC La Universidad de Sendai
8	Yamagata BB	Shibata, Miyagi	Prefectural League 1st place promotion: Promoted after playoff victory.

== Tohoku Soccer League Division Champions ==
- After the 2011 Tōhoku earthquake, Division 2 North and Division 2 South were merged in one just for that season.

Division 1
Edition	Year	Winner
1	1977	Nippon Steel Kamaishi (1)
2	1978	Nippon Steel Kamaishi (2)
3	1979	Nippon Steel Kamaishi (3)
4	1980	Morioka Zebra (1)
5	1981	Nippon Steel Kamaishi (4)
6	1982	TDK (1)
7	1983	TDK (2)
8	1984	TDK (3)
9	1985	Akita City Government (1)
10	1986	Matsushima Club (1)
11	1987	Matsushima Club (2)
12	1988	TDK (4)
13	1989	TDK (5)
14	1990	NEC Yamagata (1)
15	1991	NEC Yamagata (2)
16	1992	NEC Yamagata (3)
17	1993	NEC Yamagata (4)
18	1994	Tohoku Electric Power (1)
19	1995	Sony Sendai FC (1)
20	1996	Sony Sendai FC (2)
21	1997	Sony Sendai FC (3)
22	1998	NEC TOKIN FC (1)
23	1999	NEC TOKIN FC (2)
24	2000	TDK (6)
25	2001	F.C. Primeiro (1)
26	2002	TDK (7)
27	2003	TDK (8)
28	2004	TDK (9)
29	2005	TDK (10, shared); Grulla Morioka (1, shared)
30	2006	TDK (11)
31	2007	Grulla Morioka (2)
32	2008	Grulla Morioka (3)
33	2009	Grulla Morioka (4)
34	2010	Grulla Morioka (5)
35	2011	Fukushima United (1)
36	2012	Fukushima United (2)
37	2013	Grulla Morioka (6)
38	2014	FC Ganju Iwate (1)
39	2015	FC Ganju Iwate (2)
40	2016	Cobaltore Onagawa (1)
41	2017	Cobaltore Onagawa (2)
42	2018	Blancdieu Hirosaki FC (1)
43	2019	Iwaki FC (1)
44	2020	Blancdieu Hirosaki FC (2)
45	2021	Cobaltore Onagawa (3)
46	2022	Cobaltore Onagawa (4)
47	2023	Blancdieu Hirosaki (3)
48	2024	Blancdieu Hirosaki (4)
49	2025	Cobaltore Onagawa (5)
50	2026	

Division 2 North
Edition	Year	Winner
1	1997	Aster Aomori (1)
2	1998	Nippon Steel Kamaishi (1)
3	1999	Nippon Steel Kamaishi (2)
4	2000	Hokuto Bank (1)
5	2001	Akita City Hall
6	2002	Hokuto Bank
7	2003	Ashikaga Corporation Kawabe FC
8	2004	Grulla Morioka
9	2005	Tono Club
10	2006	Akita Cambiare
11	2007	Akita Cambiare
12	2008	Morioka Zebra
13	2009	Fuji 2003
14	2010	Fuji 2003
15	2011	Vanraure Hachinohe*
16	2012	FC Ganju Iwate
17	2013	ReinMeer Aomori
18	2014	Blancdieu Hirosaki
19	2015	Saruta Kogyo
20	2016	Nippon Steel & Sumitomo Metal Kamaishi
21	2017	Akita Cambiare
22	2018	Saruta Kogyo
23	2019	Omiya Club
24	2020	Sutsukizaka FC
25	2021	Not played
26	2022	Oshu United FC
27	2023	Bogolle D. Tsugaru FC (ja)
28	2024	Shichinohe SC
29	2025	Bogolle D. Tsugaru (ja)
30	2026	

Division 2 South
Edition	Year	Winner
1	1997	Furukawa Battery (1)
2	1998	F.C. Primeiro
3	1999	Shichigahama SC
4	2000	Matsushima Club
5	2001	Furukawa Battery (2)
6	2002	Sagawa Express Tohoku
7	2003	Sendai Nakata Club
8	2004	Northern Peaks Koriyama
9	2005	Sendai Nakata Club
10	2006	Furukawa Battery (3)
11	2007	Biancone Fukushima
12	2008	Fukushima United
13	2009	Cobaltore Onagawa
14	2010	FC Scheinen Fukushima
15	2011	Vanraure Hachinohe*
16	2012	Bandits Iwaki
17	2013	Merry (1)
18	2014	Iwaki Furukawa FC
19	2015	Sendai Sasuke (1)
20	2016	Merry (2)
21	2017	Iwaki Furukawa FC
22	2018	Iwaki FC
23	2019	FC Sendai University
24	2020	Shichigahama SC
25	2021	Not played.
26	2022	FC La U. de Sendai
27	2023	FC La U. de Sendai Segunda
28	2024	Sendai Sasuke (2)
29	2025	Oyama Club
30	2026	

== Second Division North-South Unified League (2011) ==
The 2011 season was held in a unified manner without being divided into north and south, as five teams declined to participate due to the Tohoku earthquake: Cobaltore Onagawa, FC Scheinen Fukushima, Bandits Iwaki, Iwaki Furukawa FC, and Merry. It was a one-round robin between the remaining eleven teams.

In addition, it was originally planned that the winning teams from each of the North and South blocks of the second division would automatically replace the bottom two teams of the first division. However, for the above reasons, automatic promotion from the second division to the first division was not allowed for the 2012 season.

== Venues in Tohoku ==
Tohoku Soccer League Football Grounds in Japan

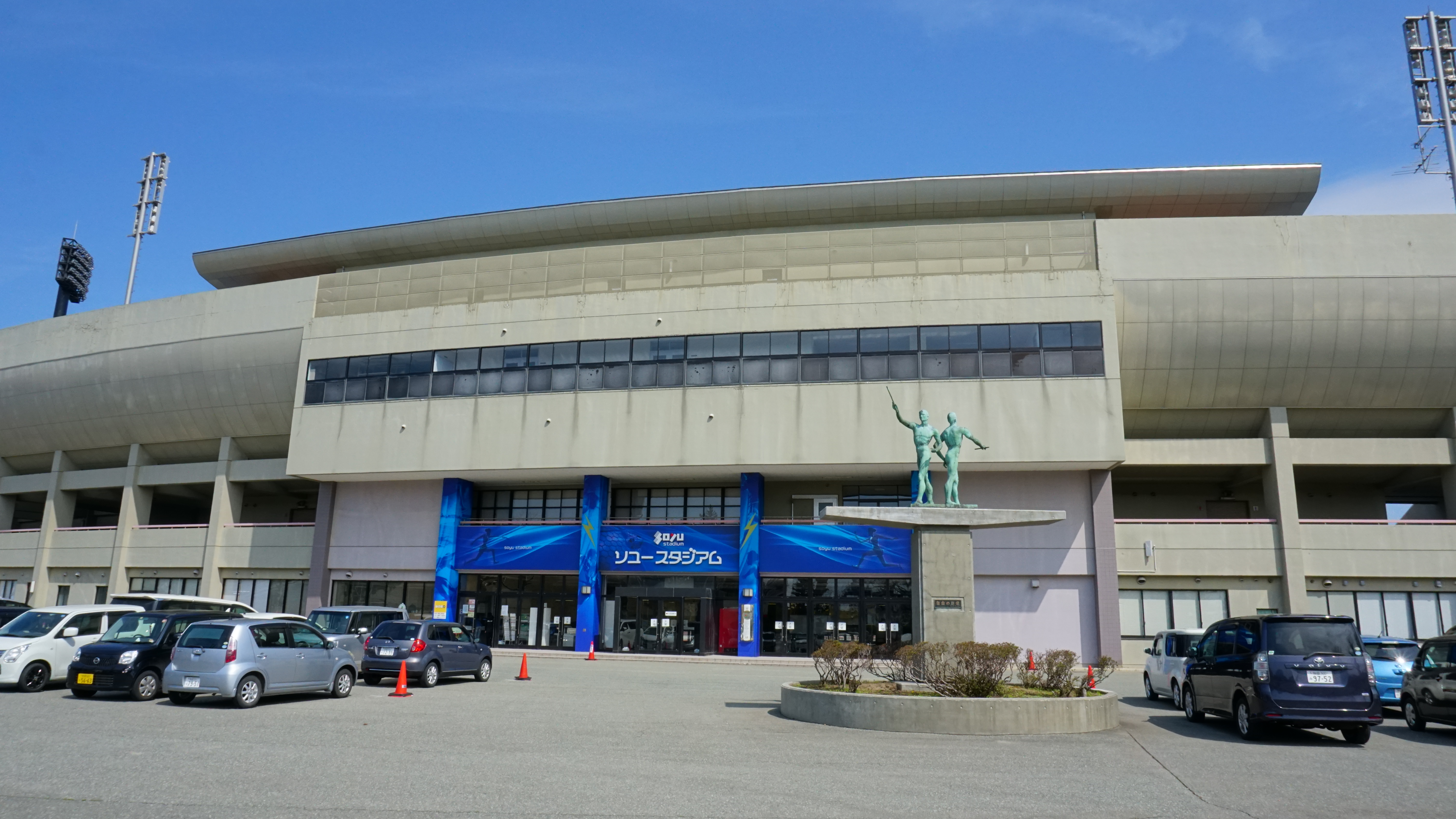
Soyu Stadium

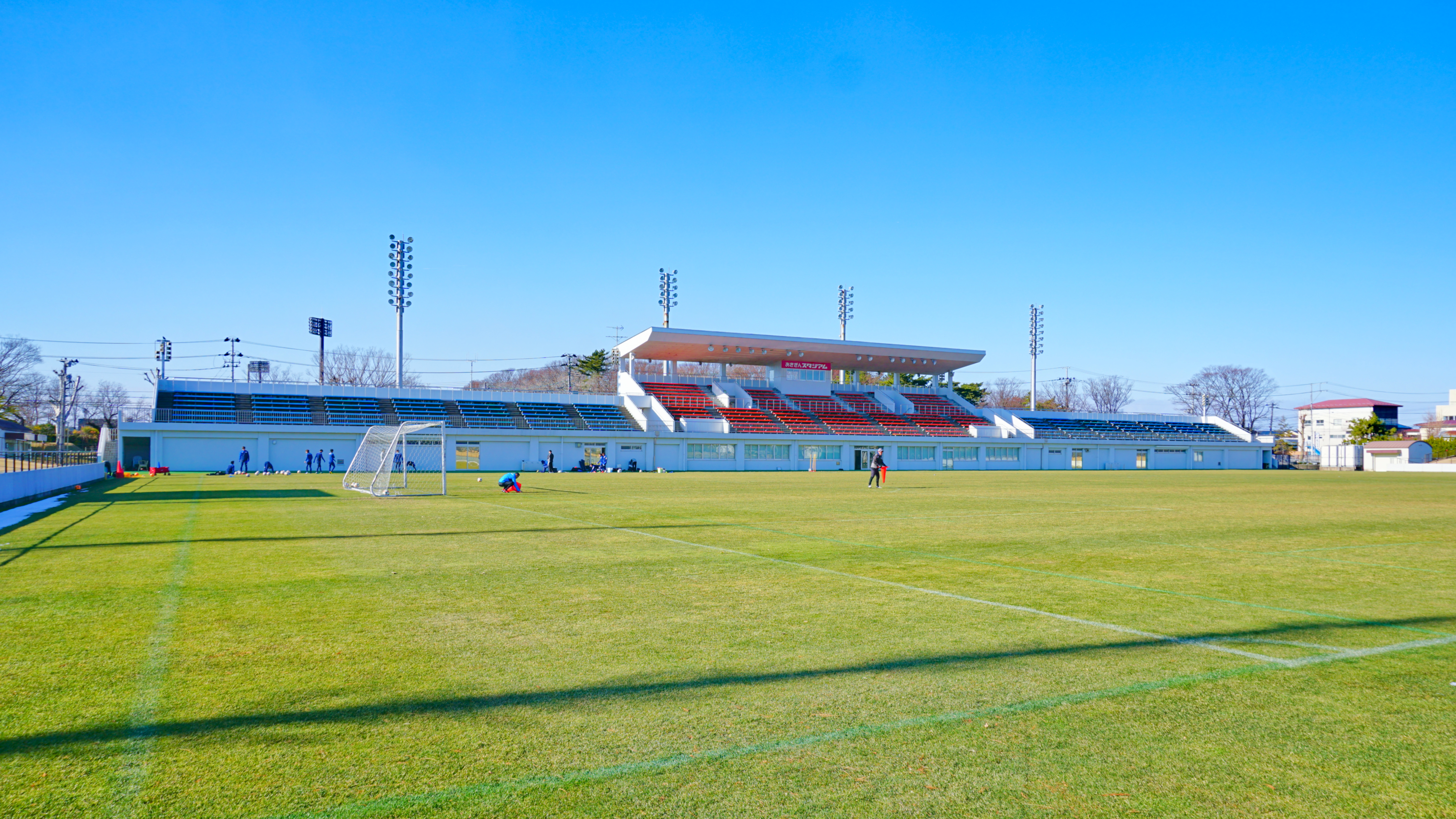
Akigin Stadium

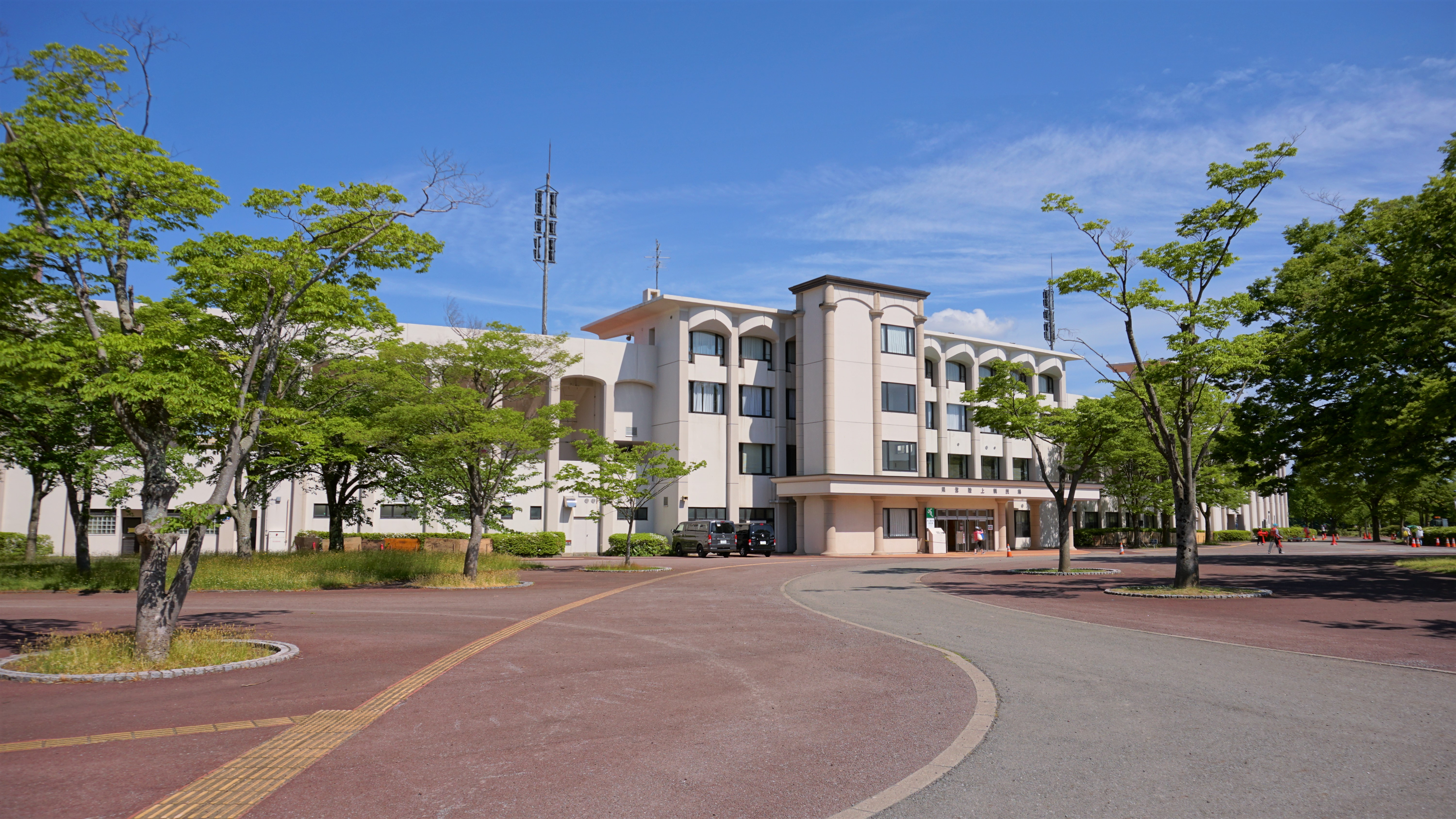
Akita Prefectural Central Park Athletic Stadium

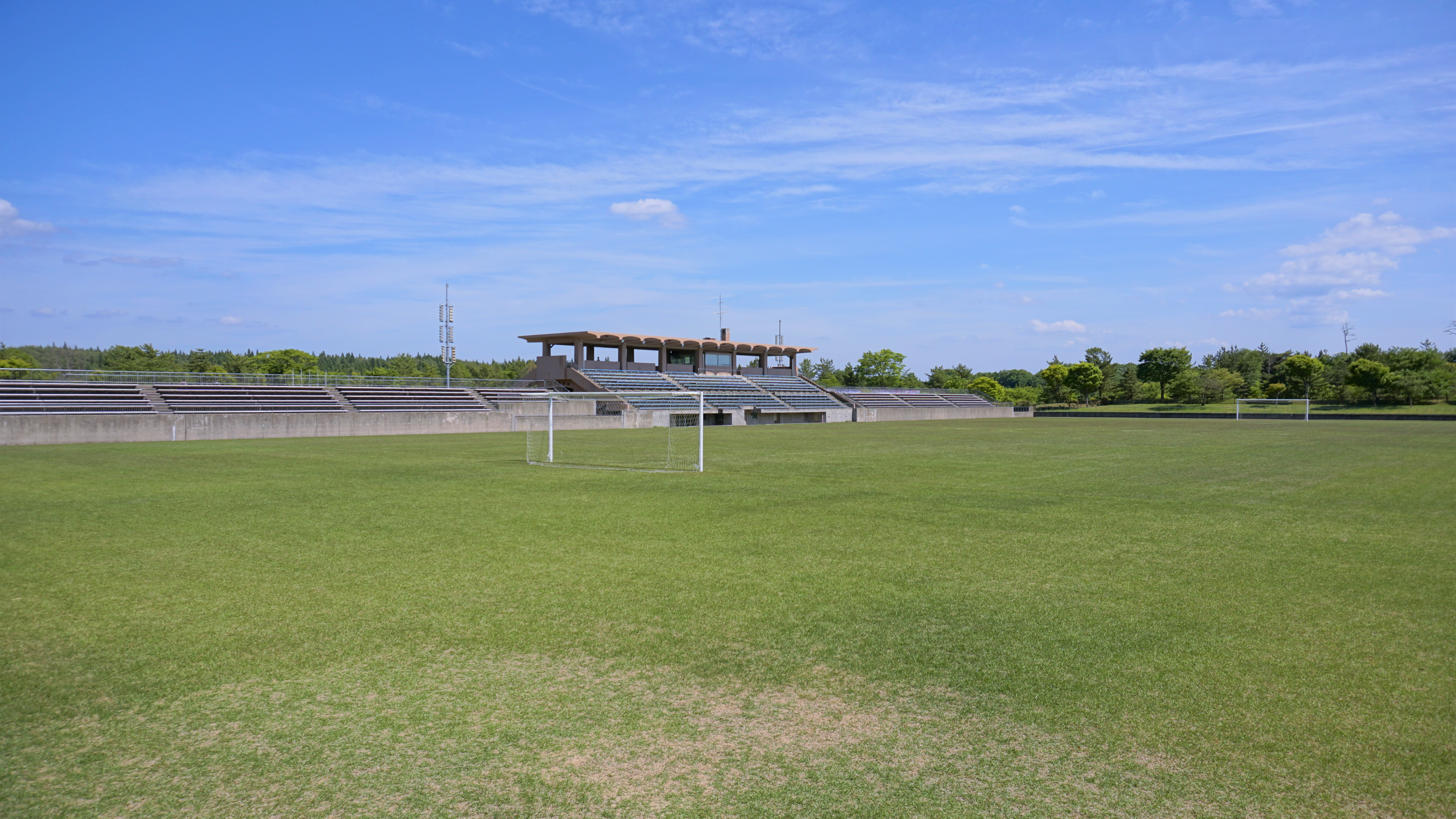
Akita Prefectural Central Park Playing Field

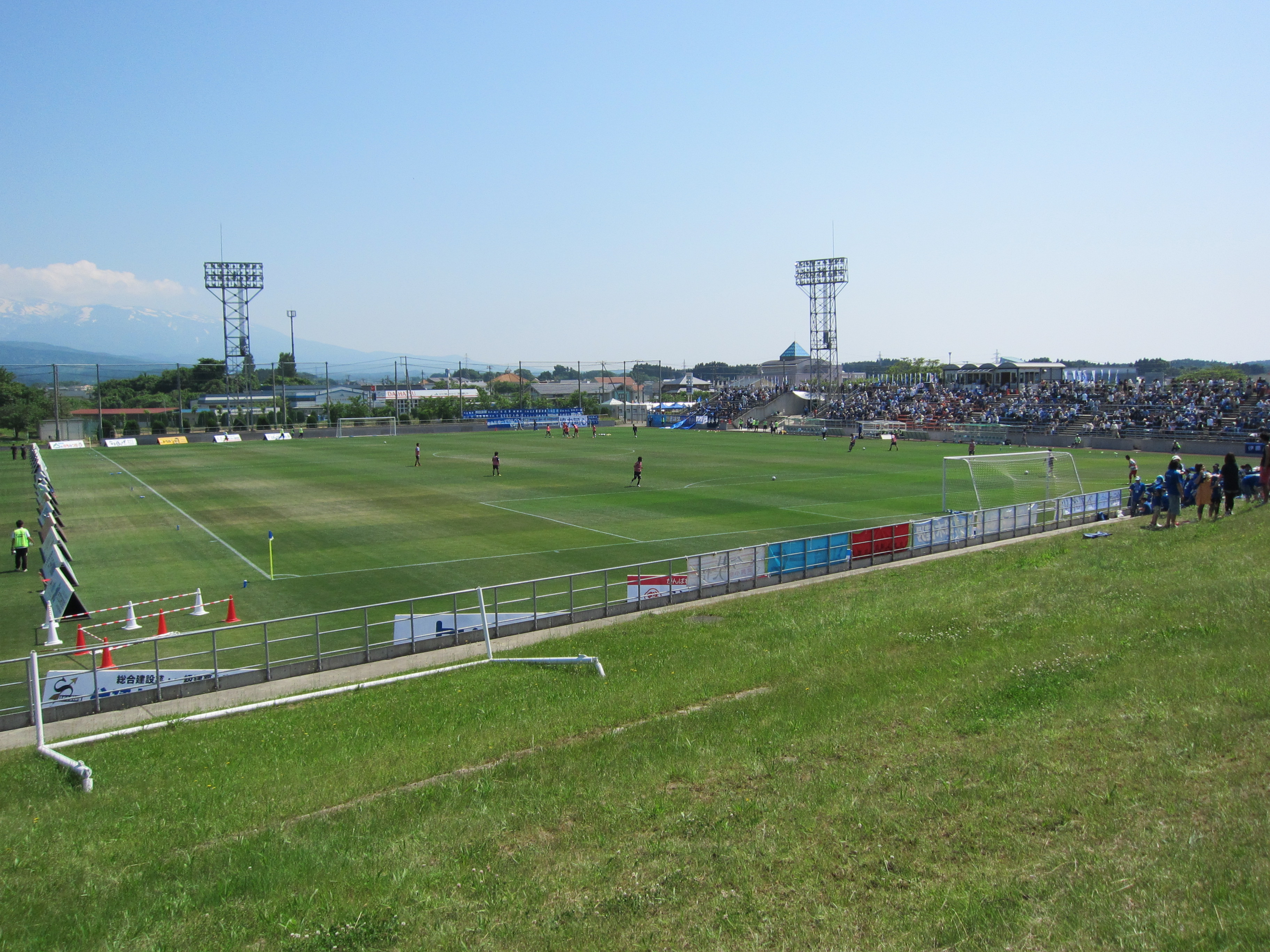
Nikaho Green Field

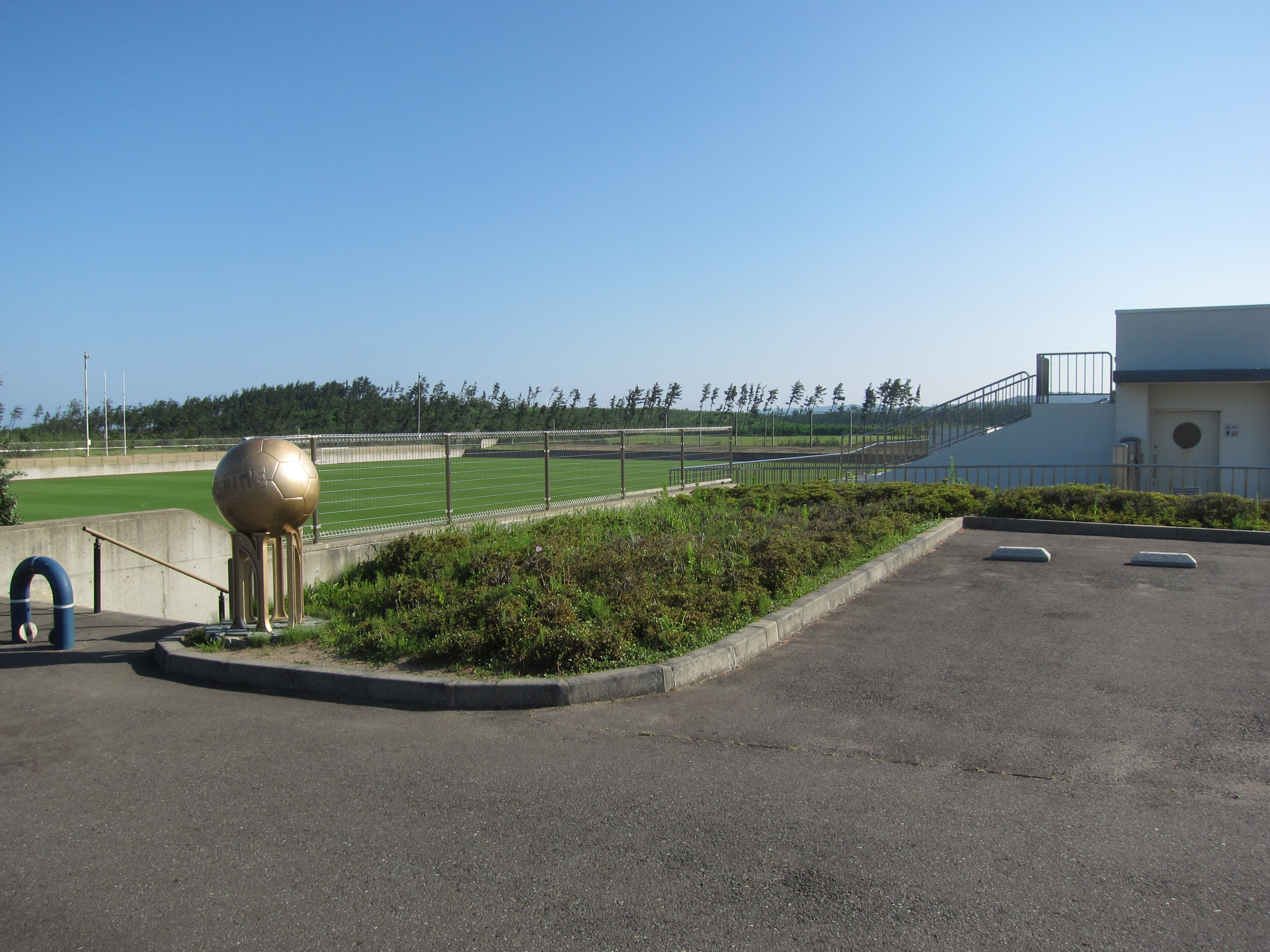
Nishime Country Park Soccer Field

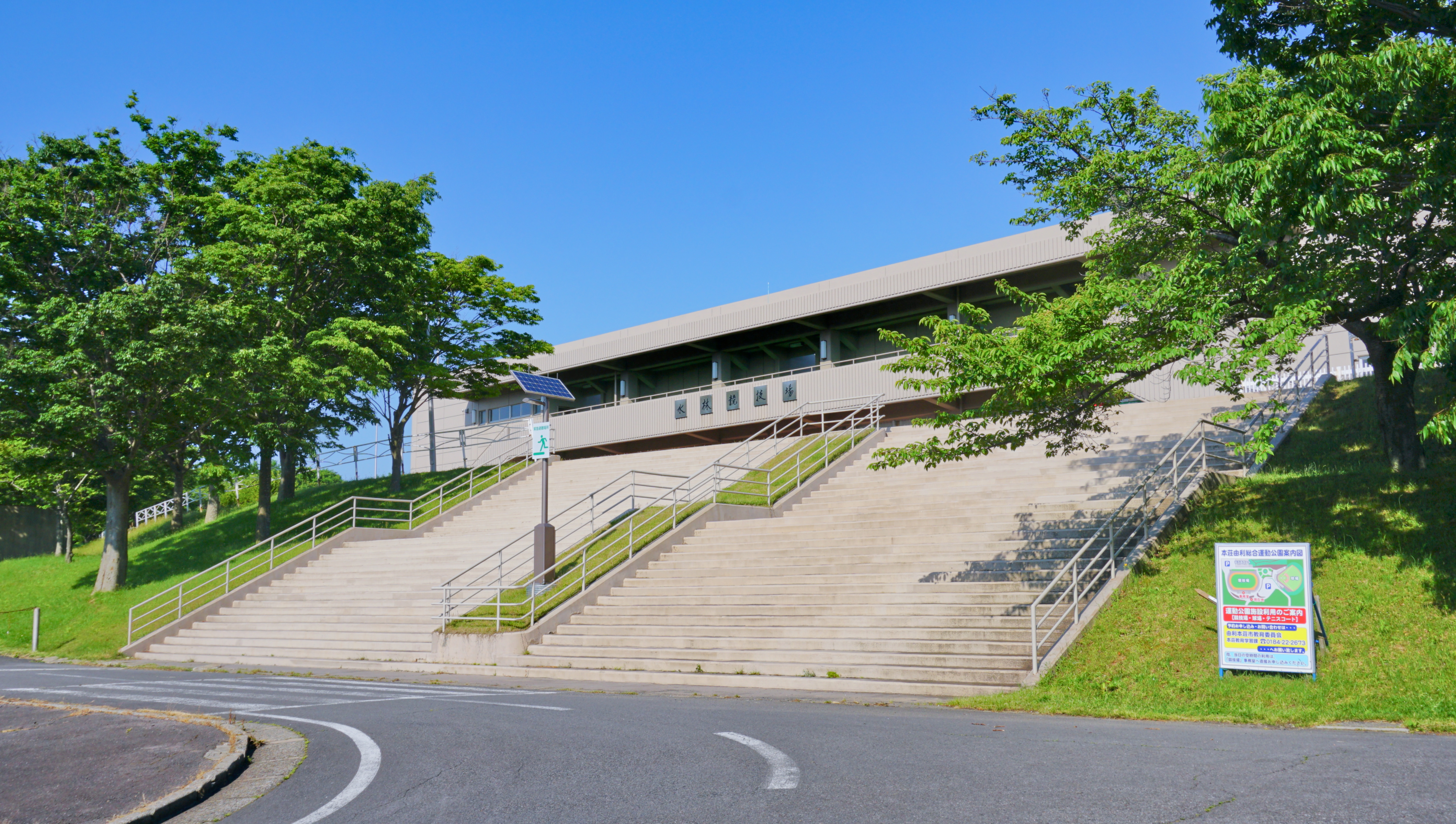
Mizubayashi Athletic Stadium

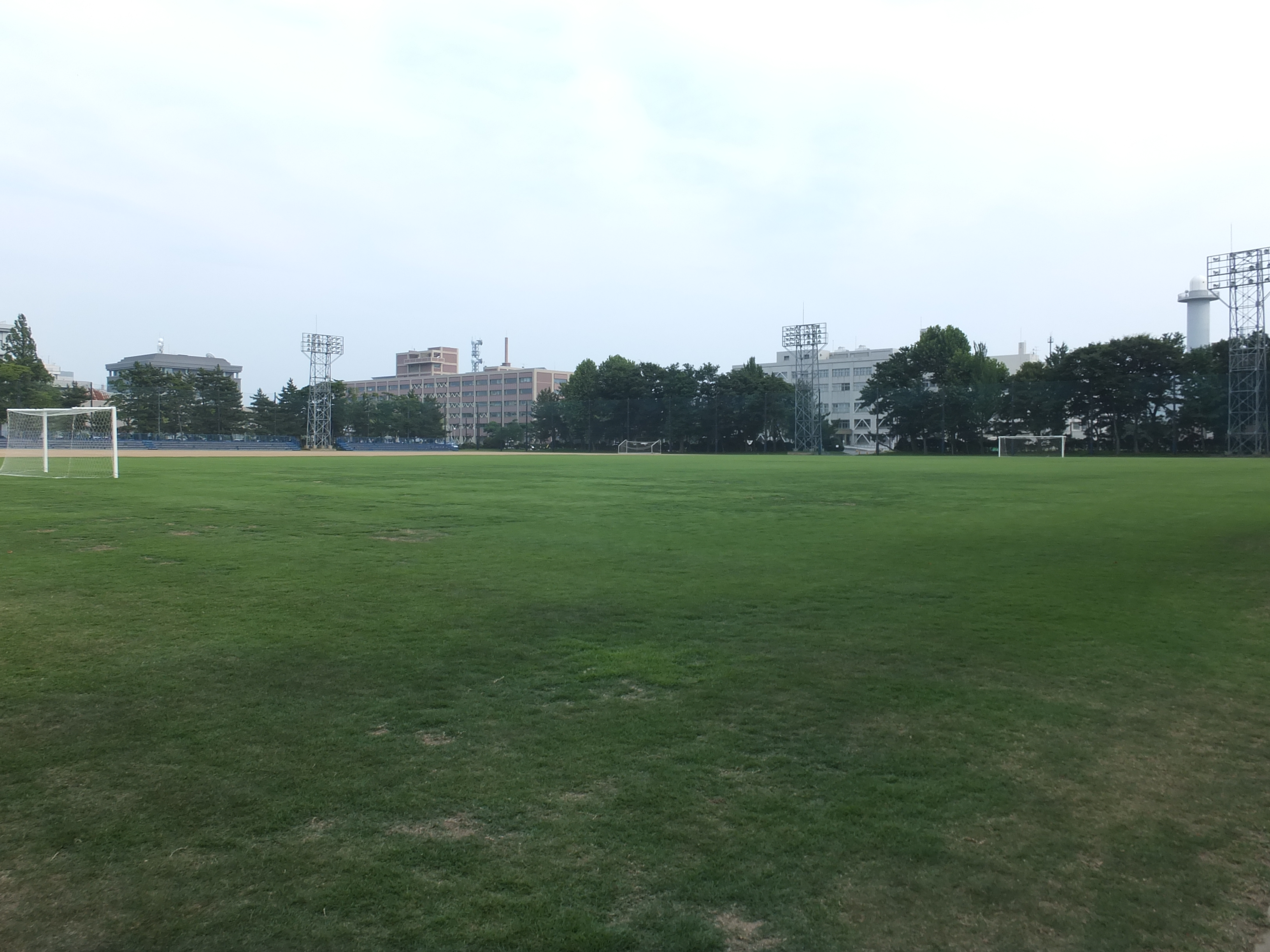
Space Project Dream Field

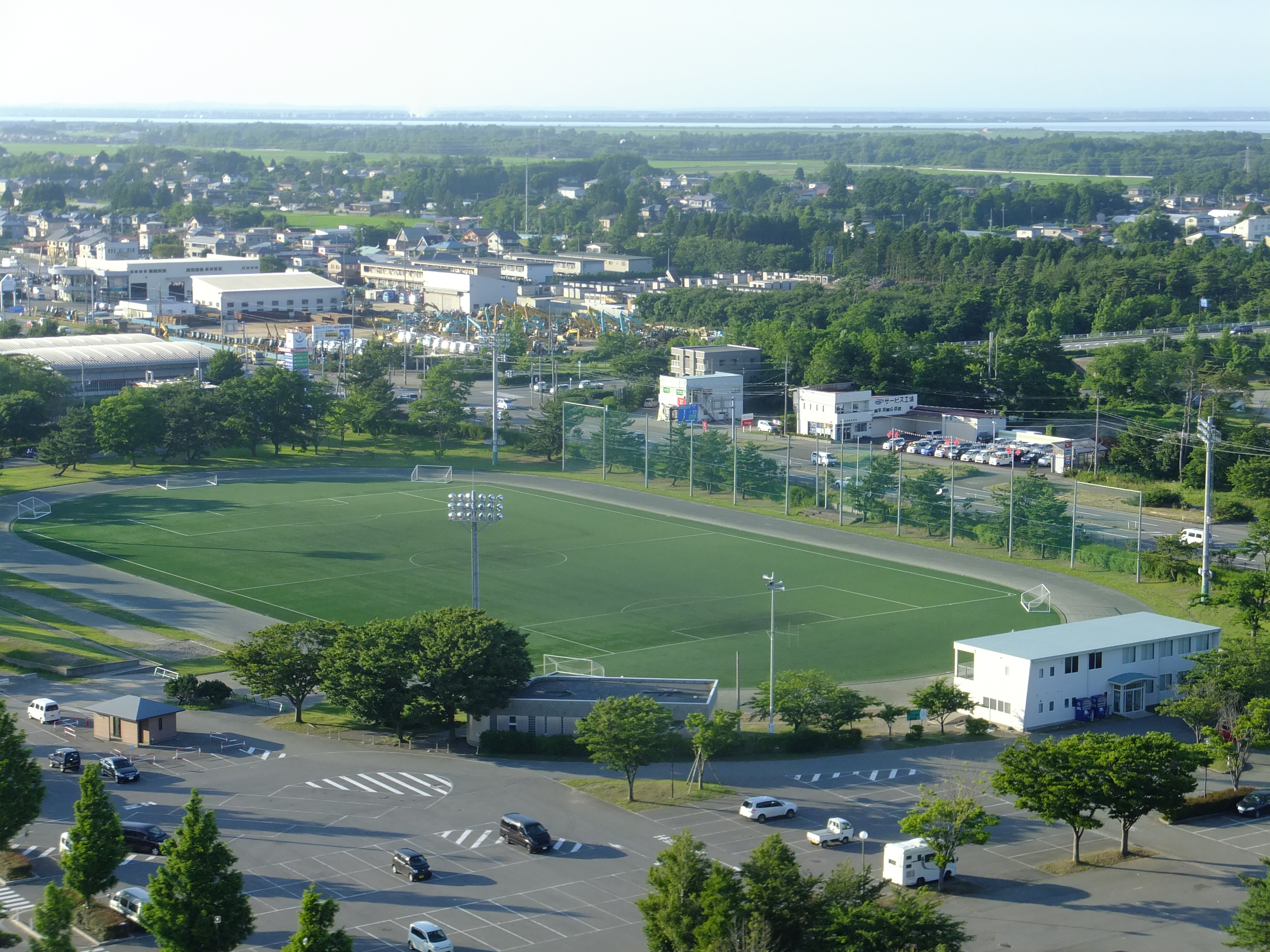
Akita Prefecture Football Centre

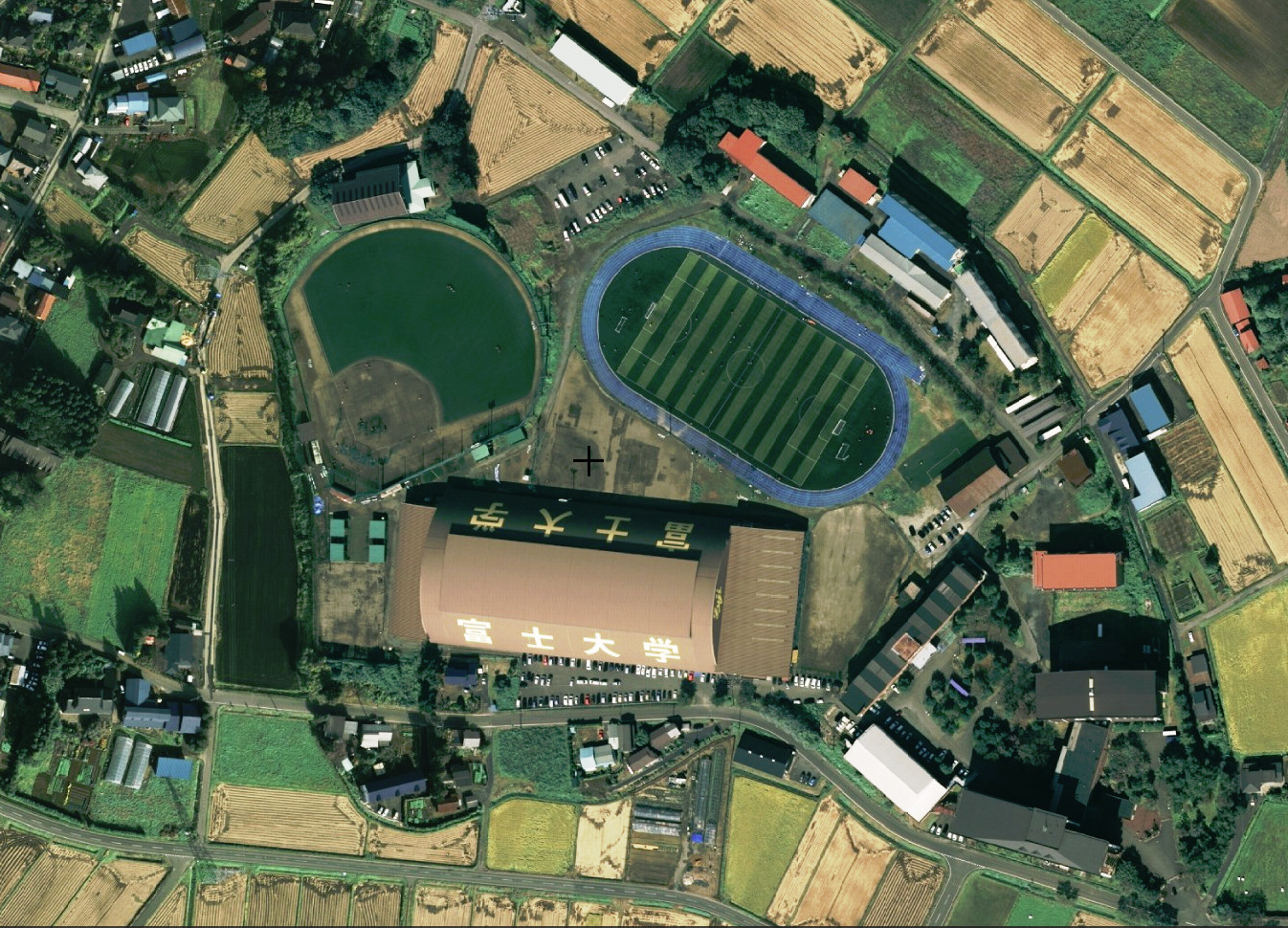
Fuji University

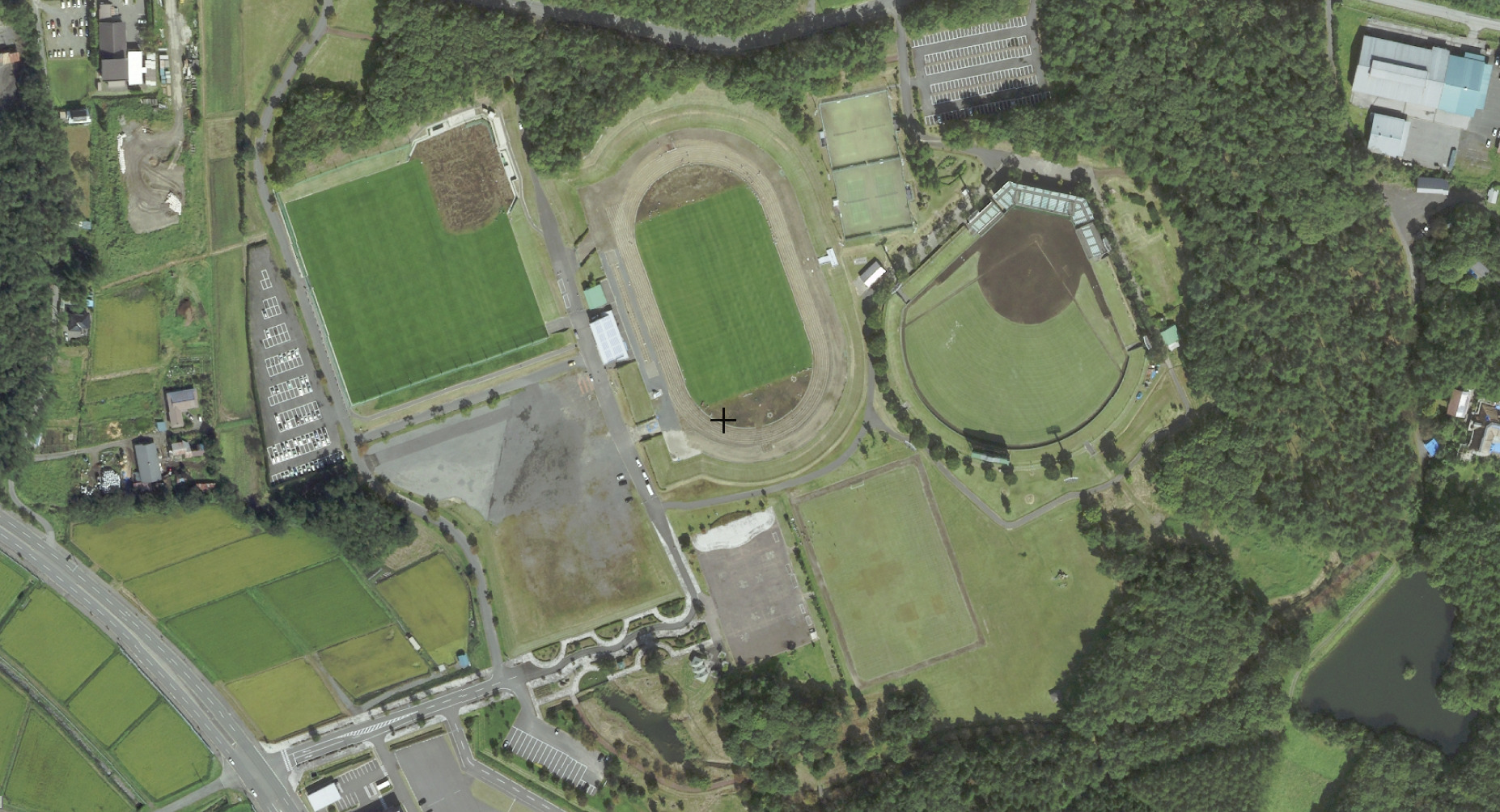
Tono Athletic Stadium

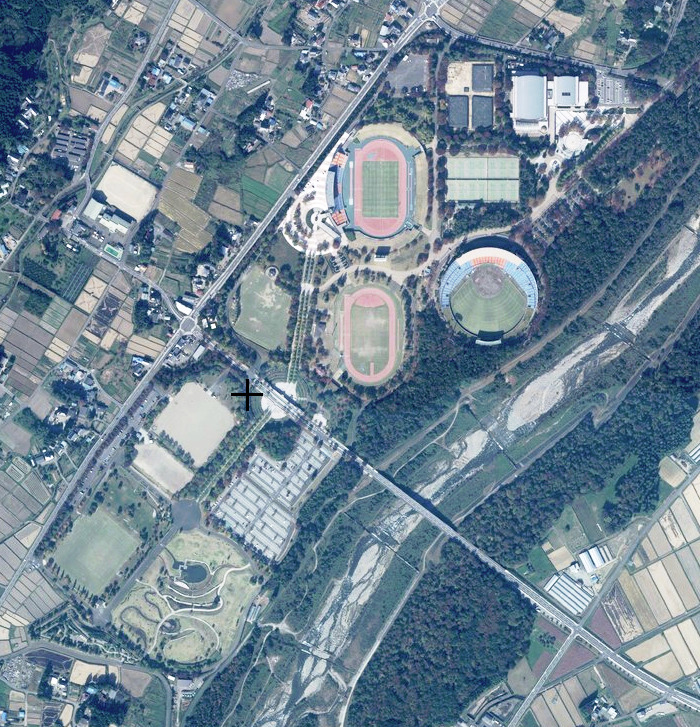
Azuma Sports Park

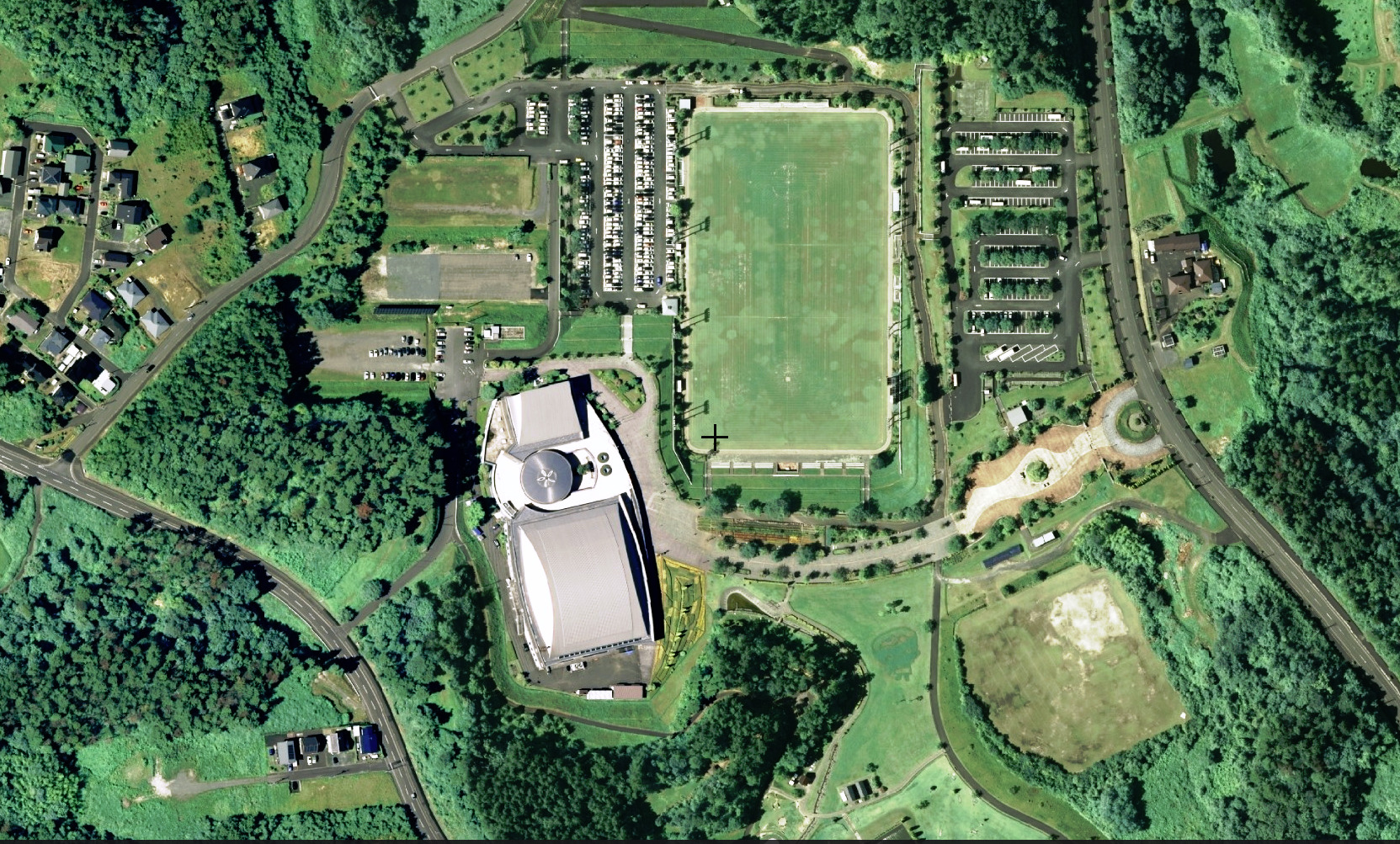
Oshu Fureai Park

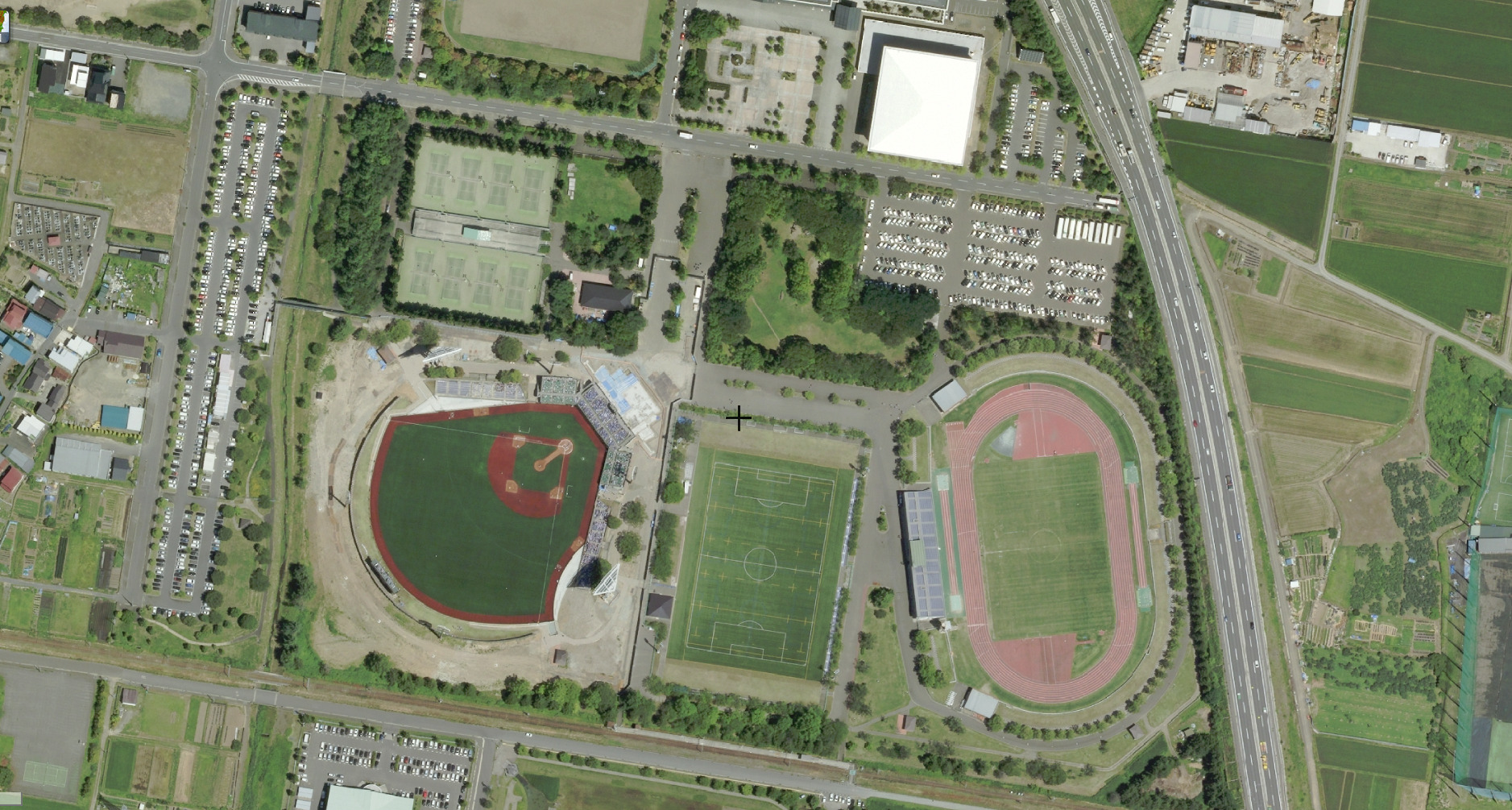
Hirosaki Sports Park

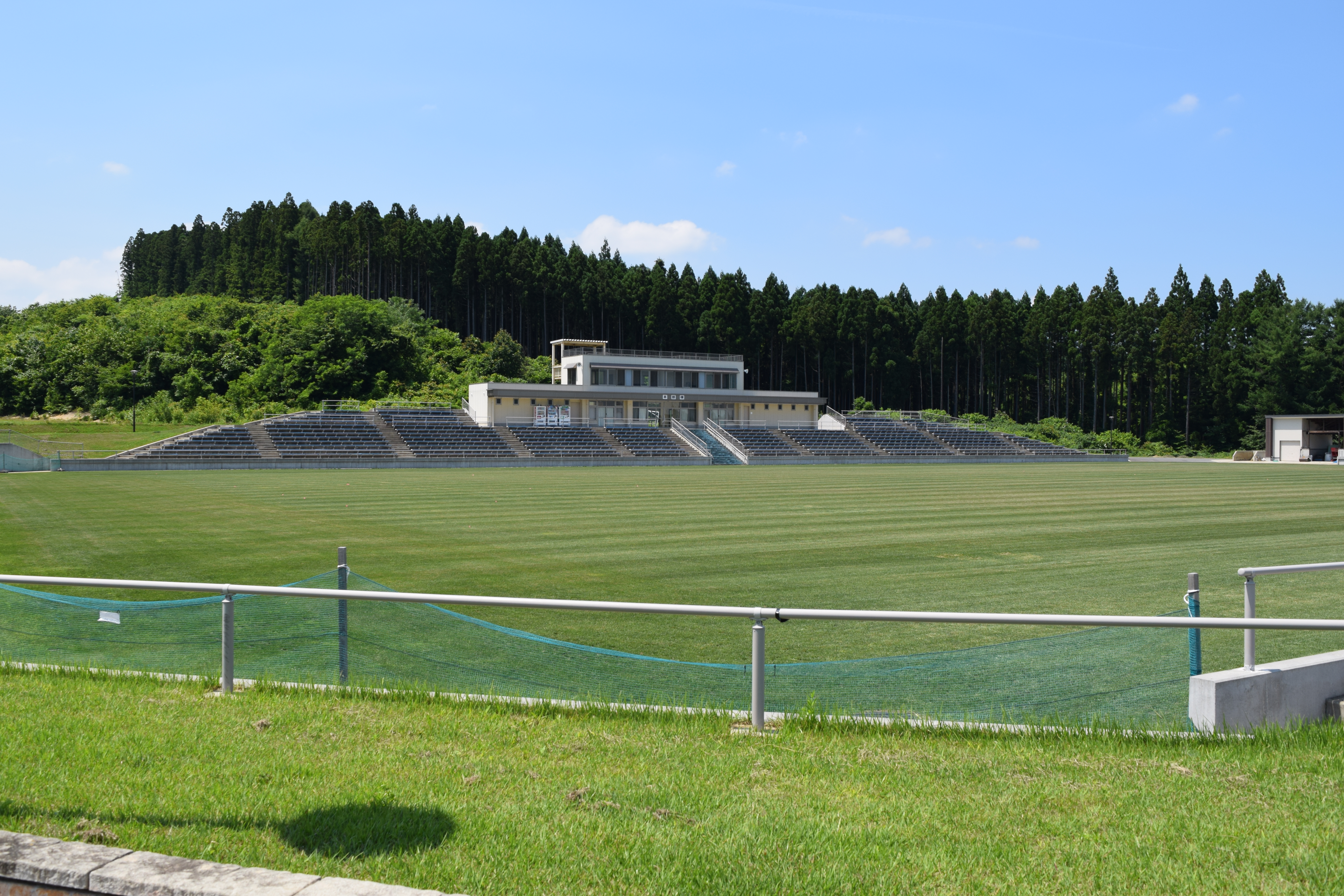
Towada Takamoriyama Playing Field

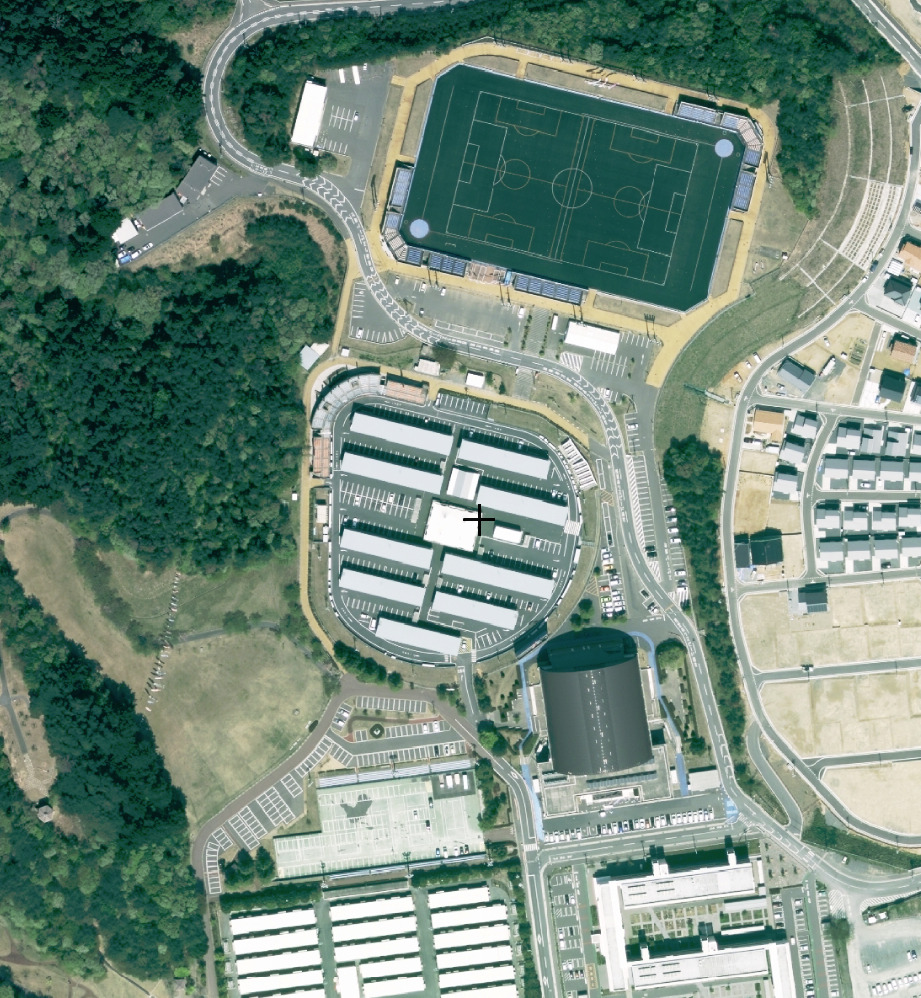
Onagawa Sports Park

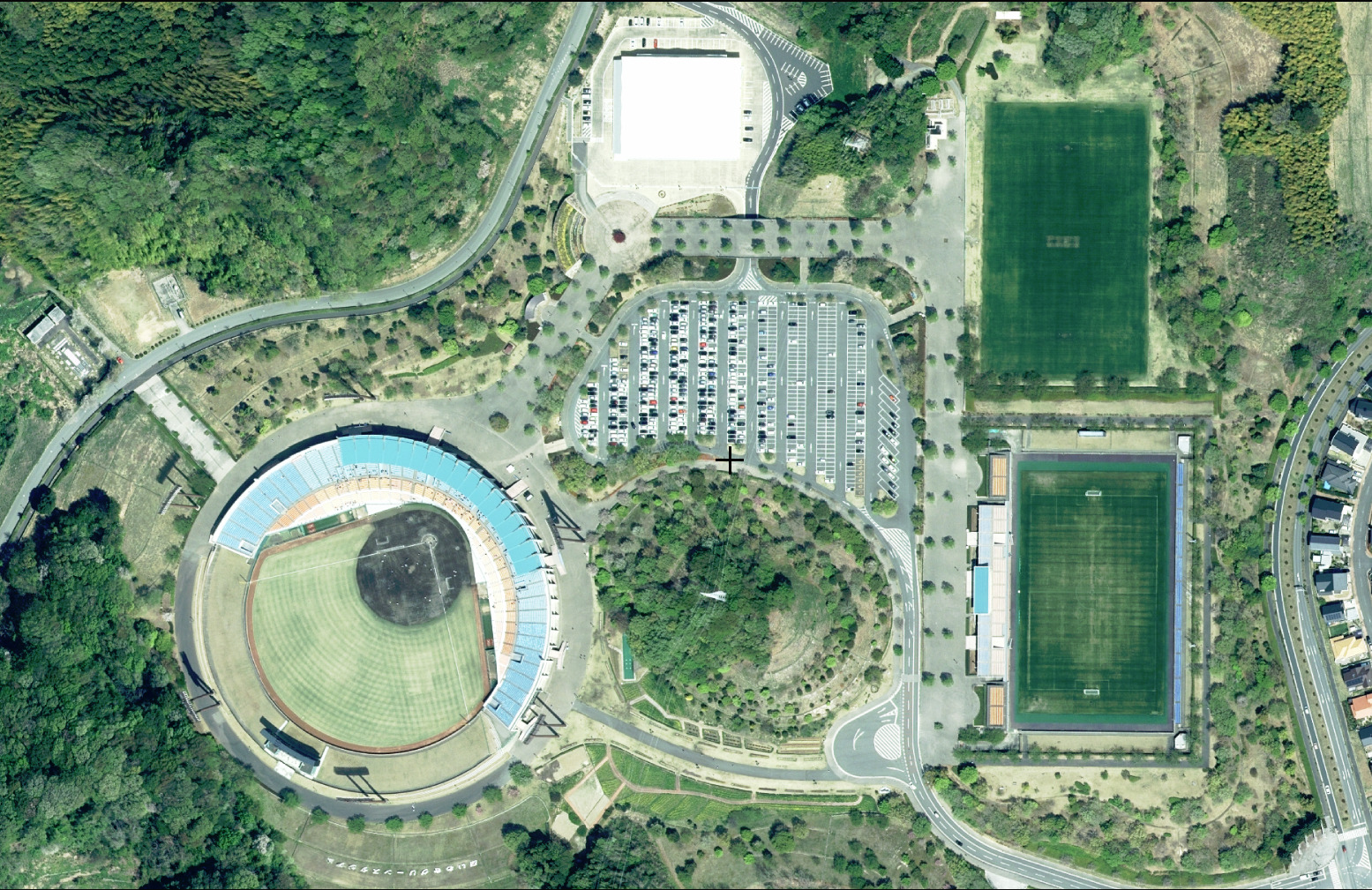
Iwaki Green Field

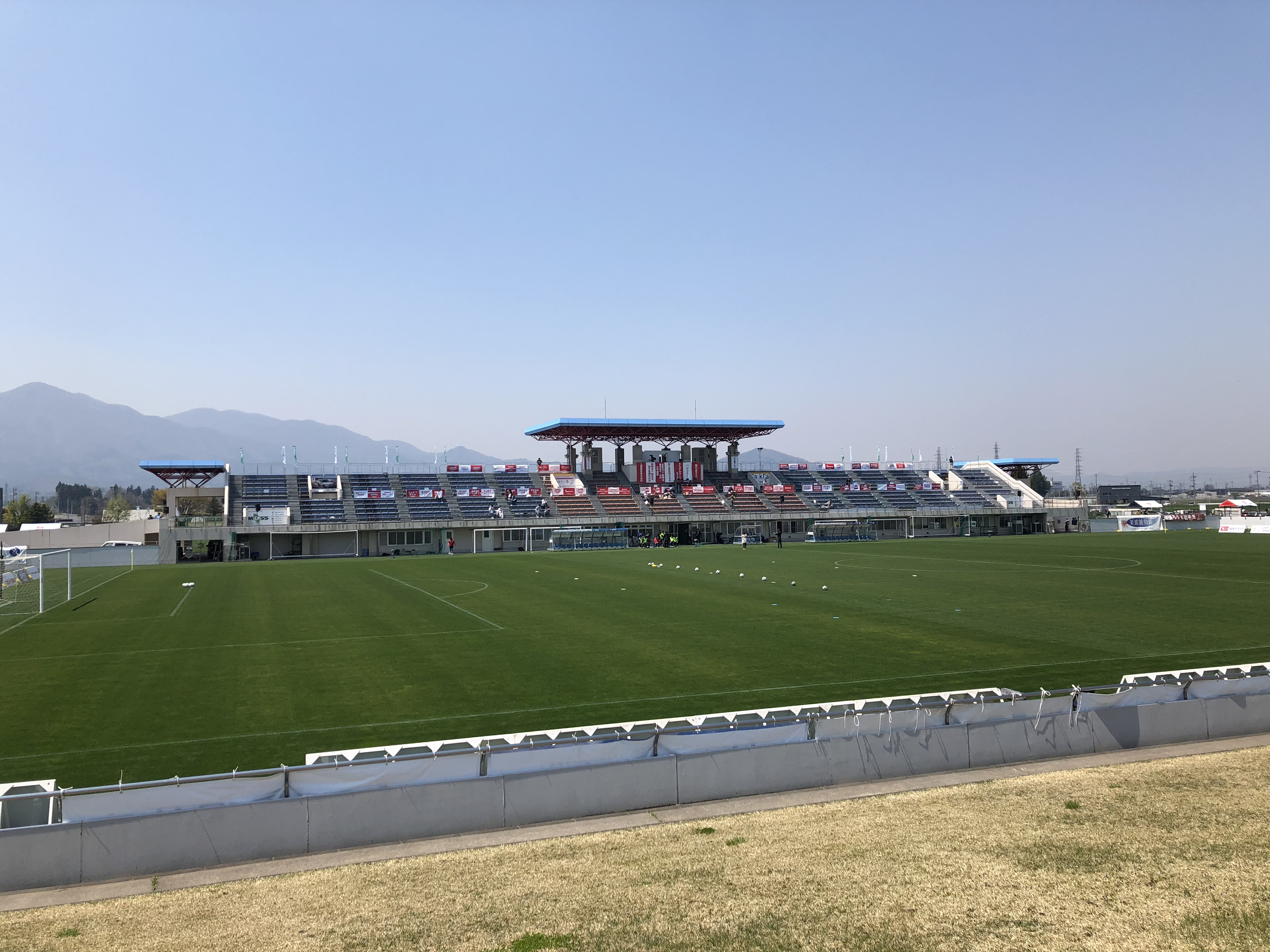
Iwagin Stadium

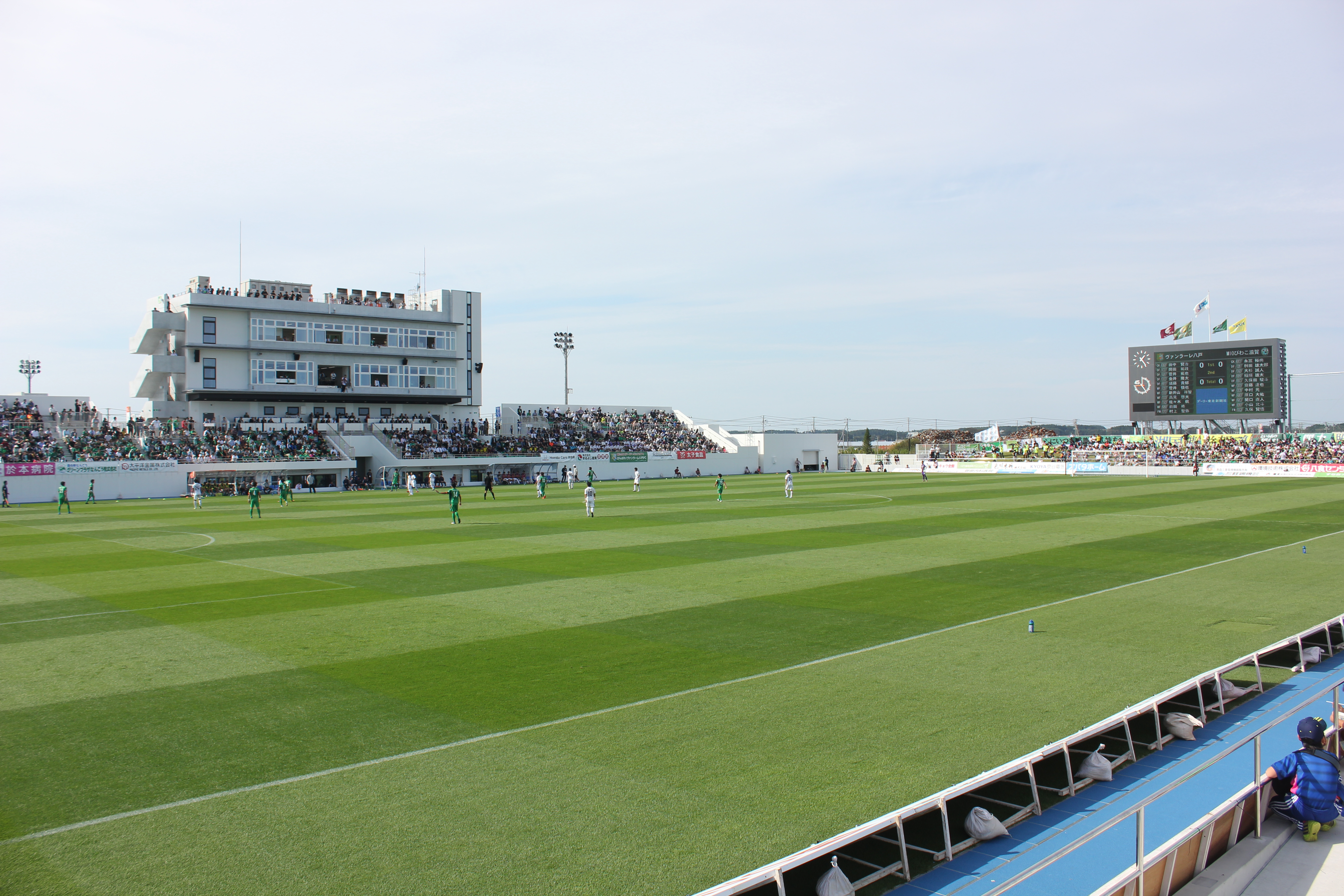
Taga Stadium

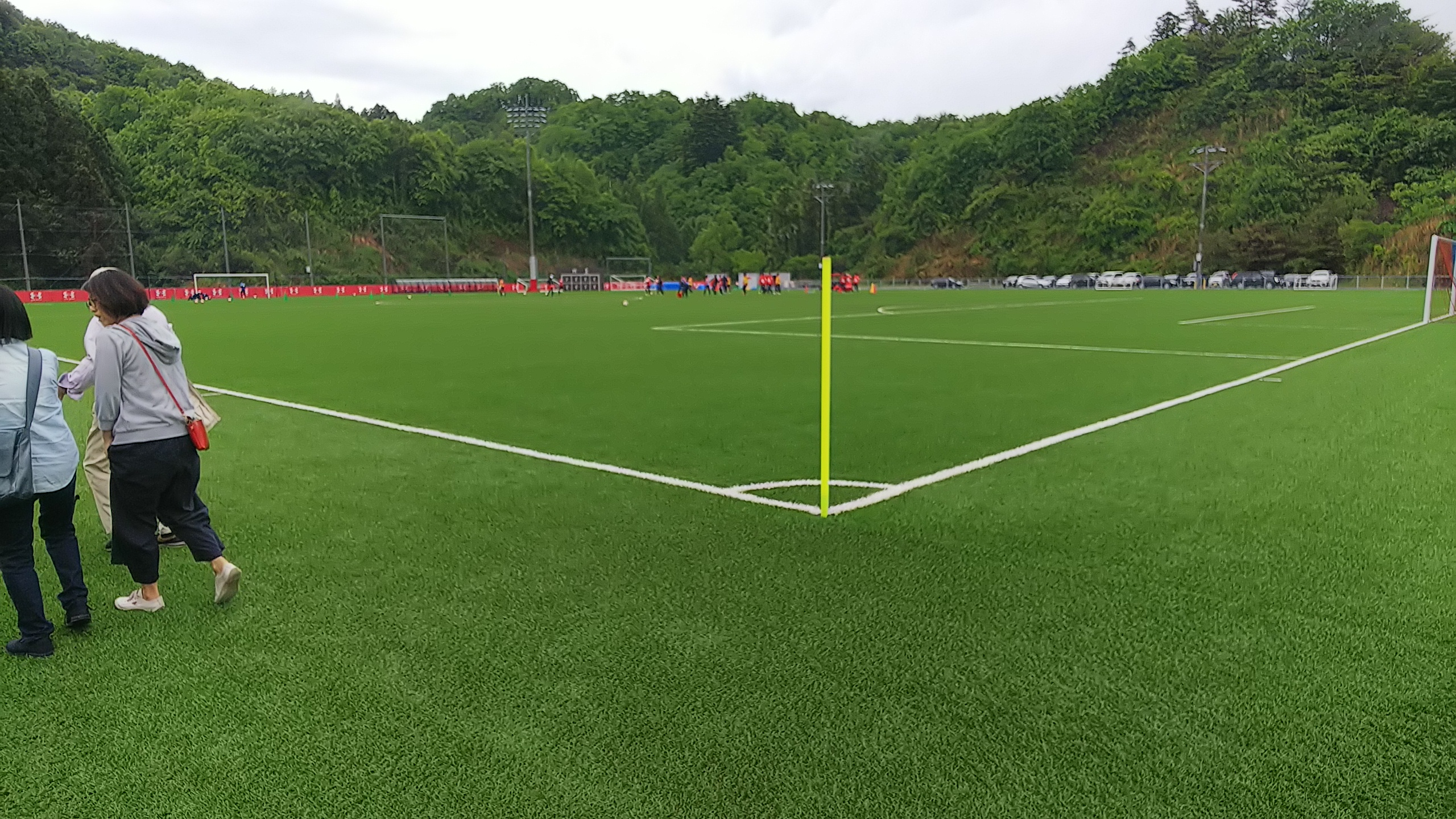
Iwaki FC Field

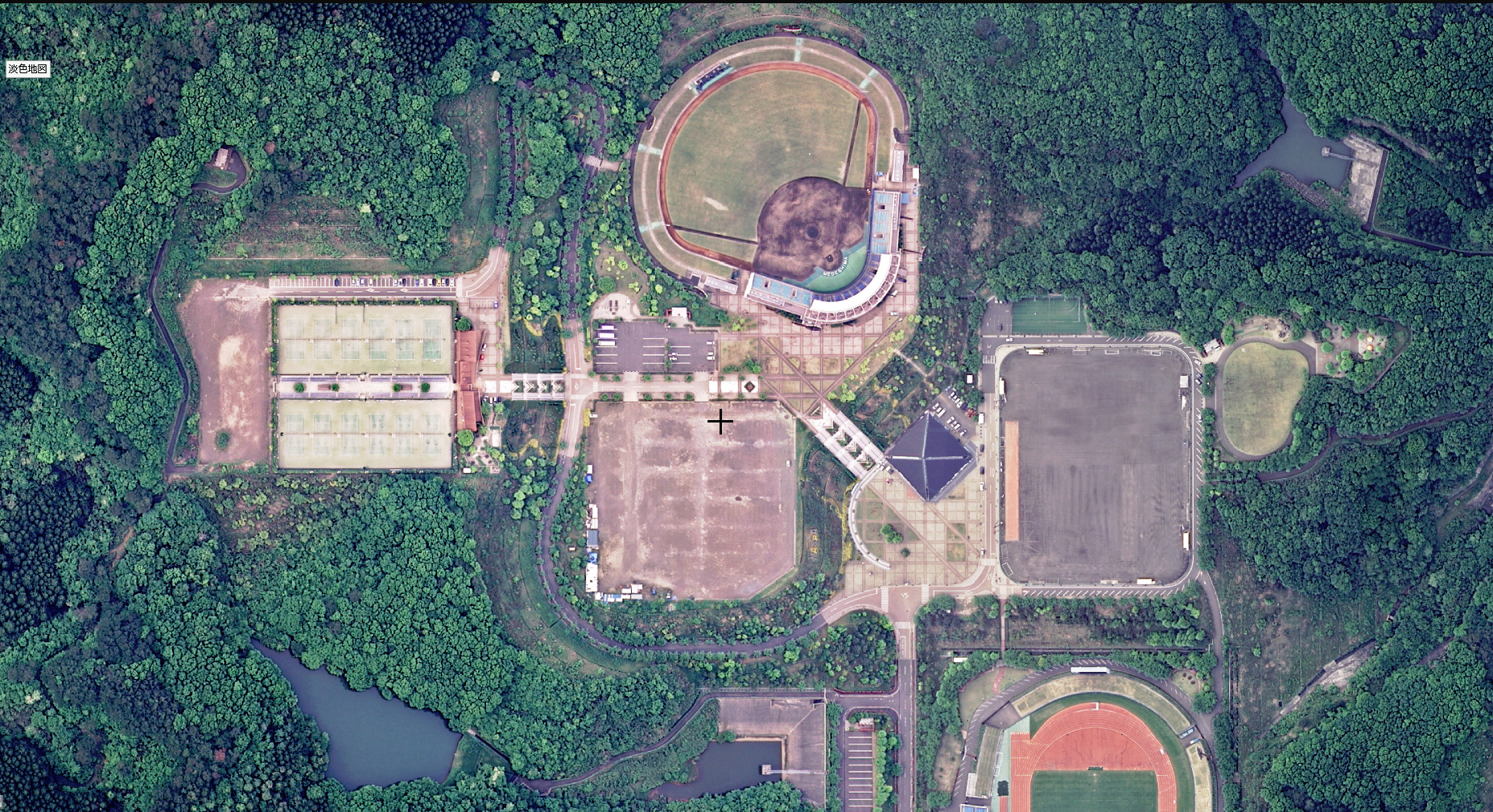
NASpA in 2008

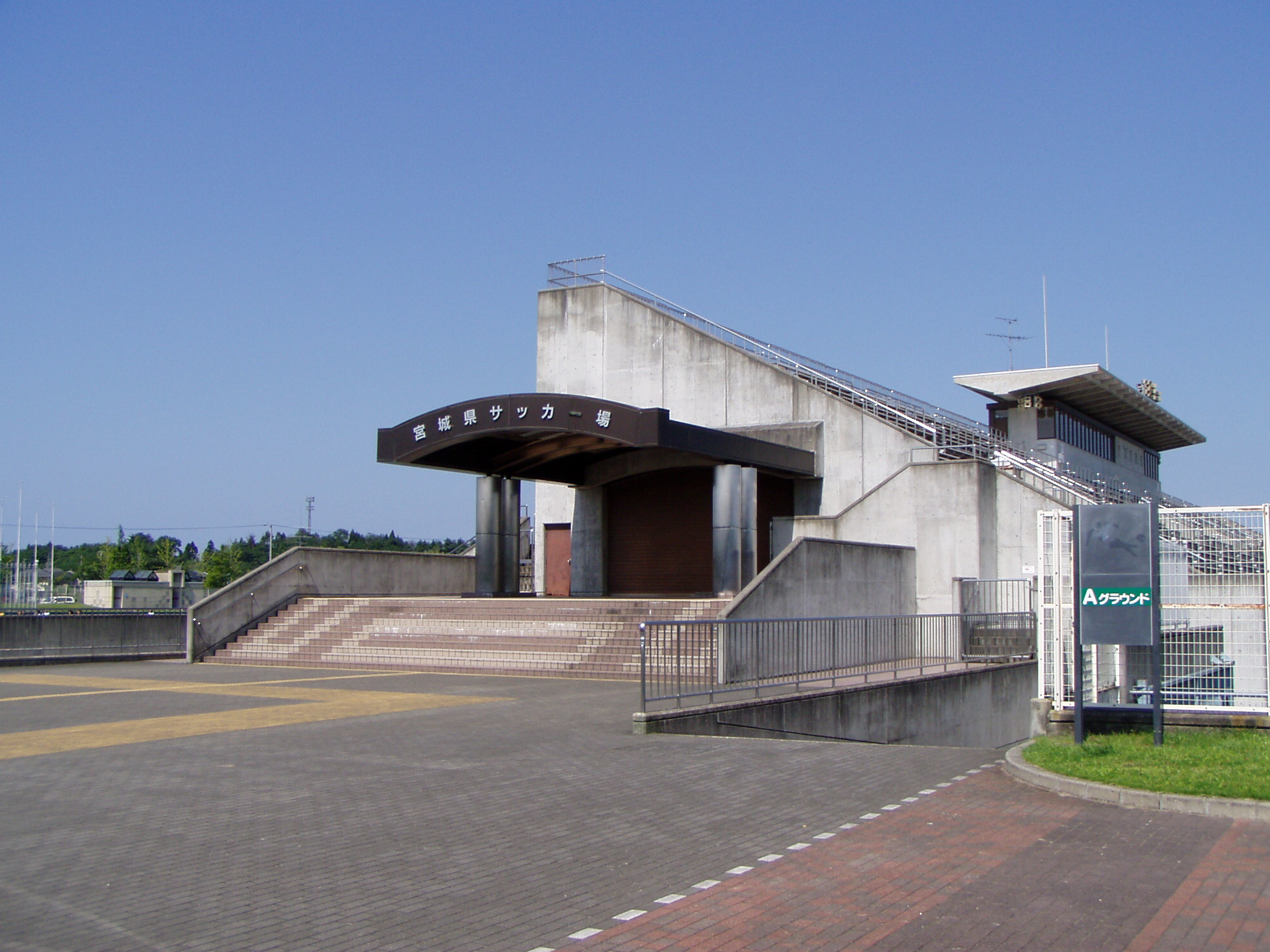
Miyagi Coop Megumino Soccer Field

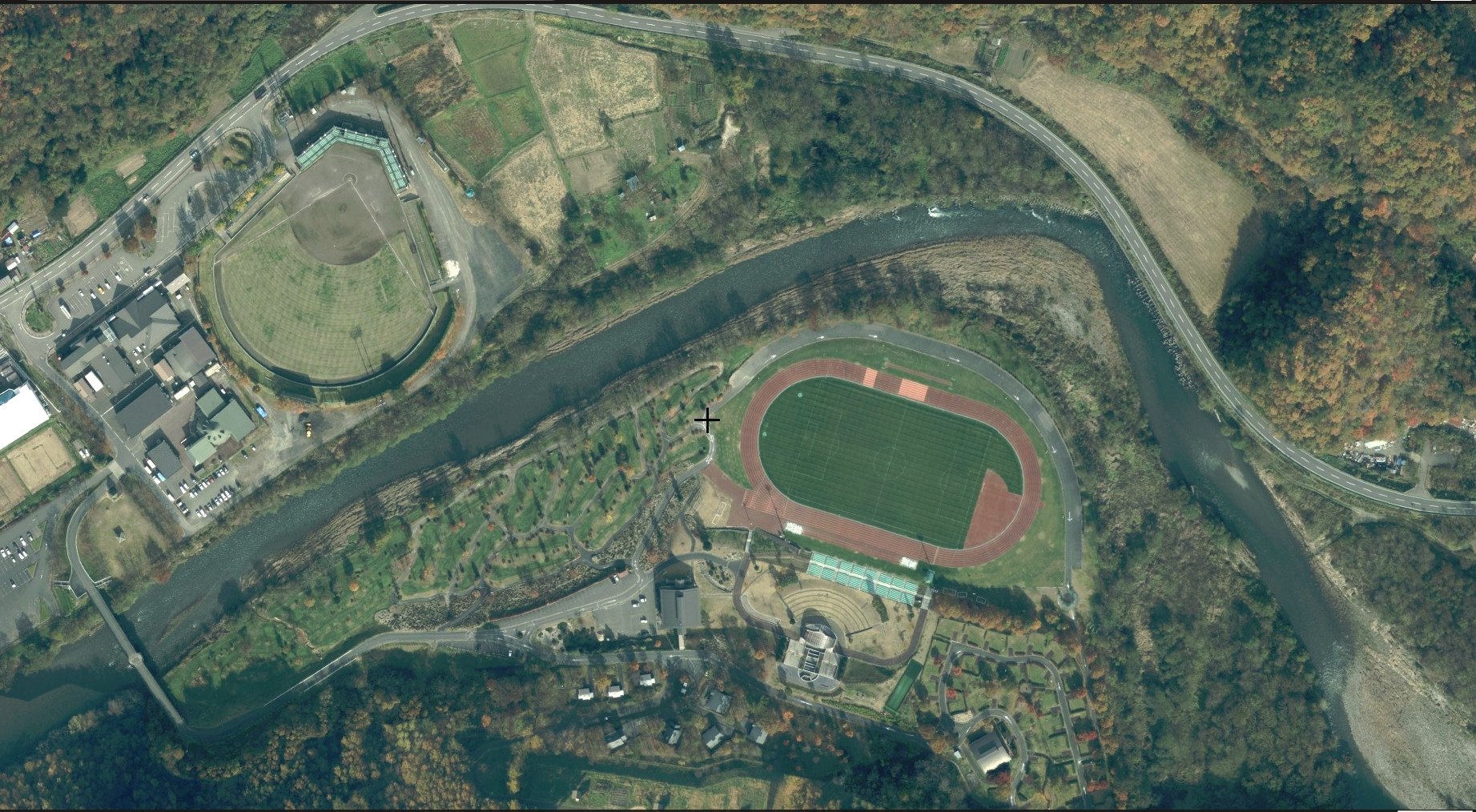
Fureai Land Iwaizumi

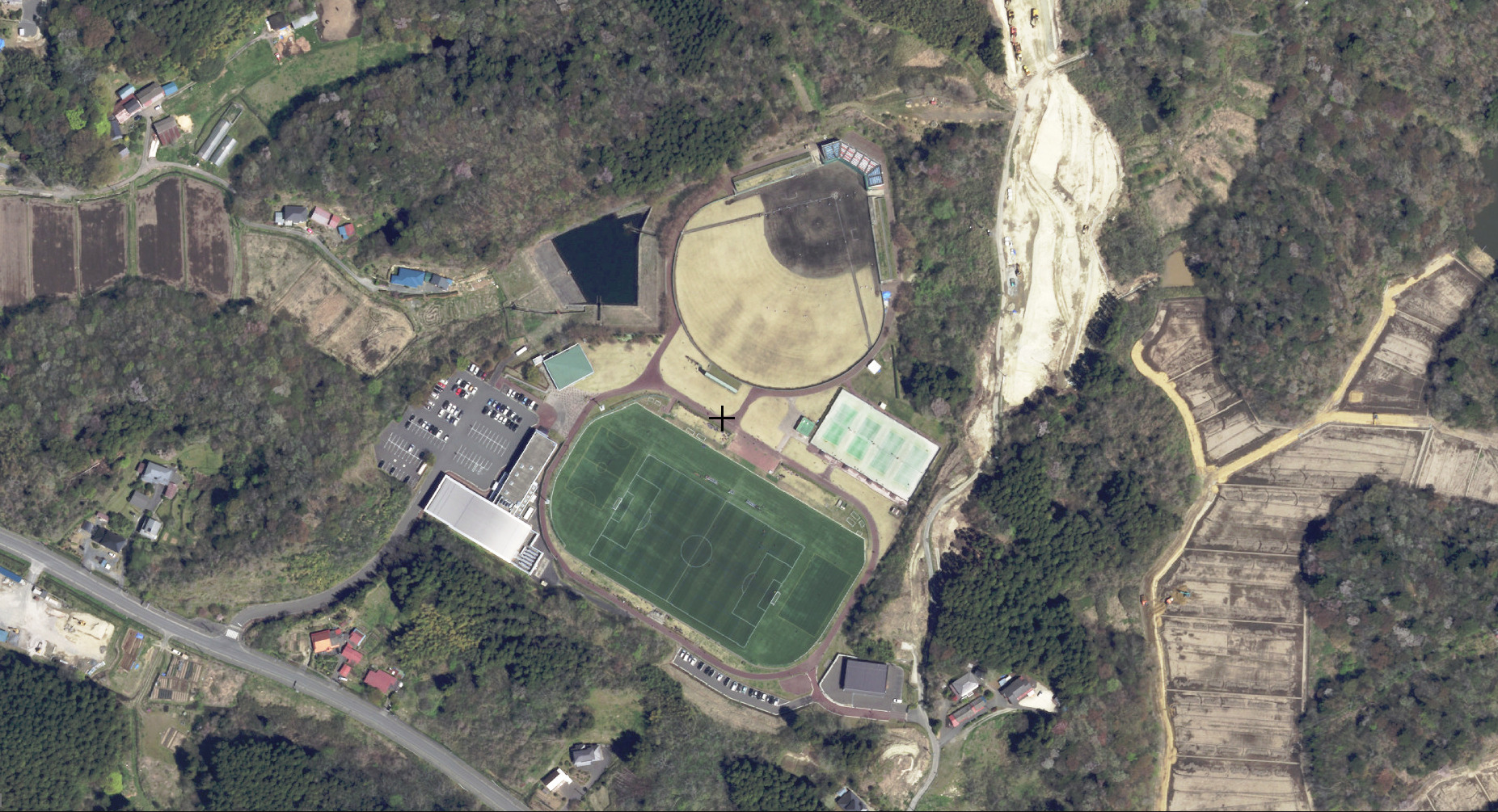
Matsushima Sports Park

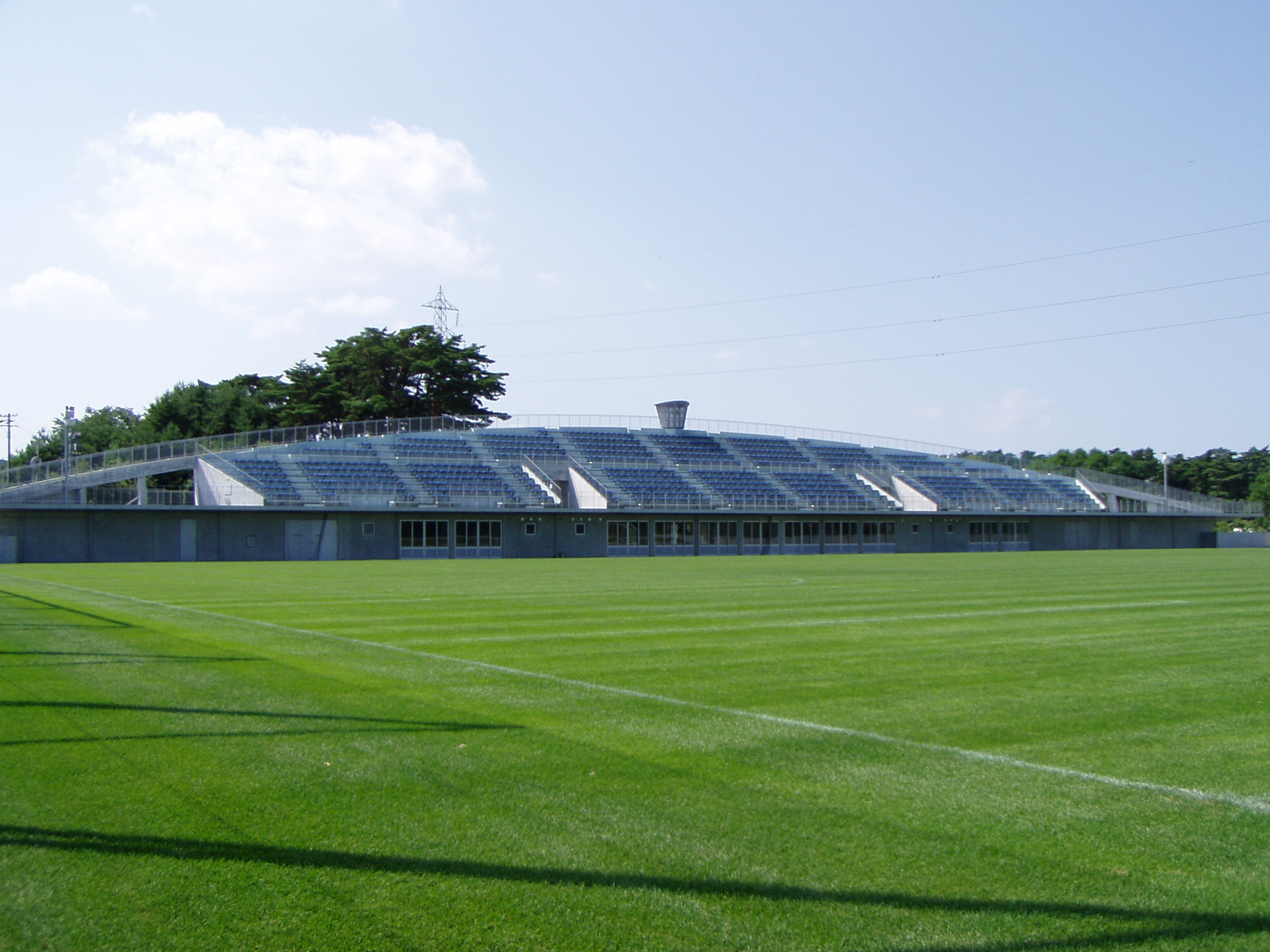
Shichigahama Soccer Stadium

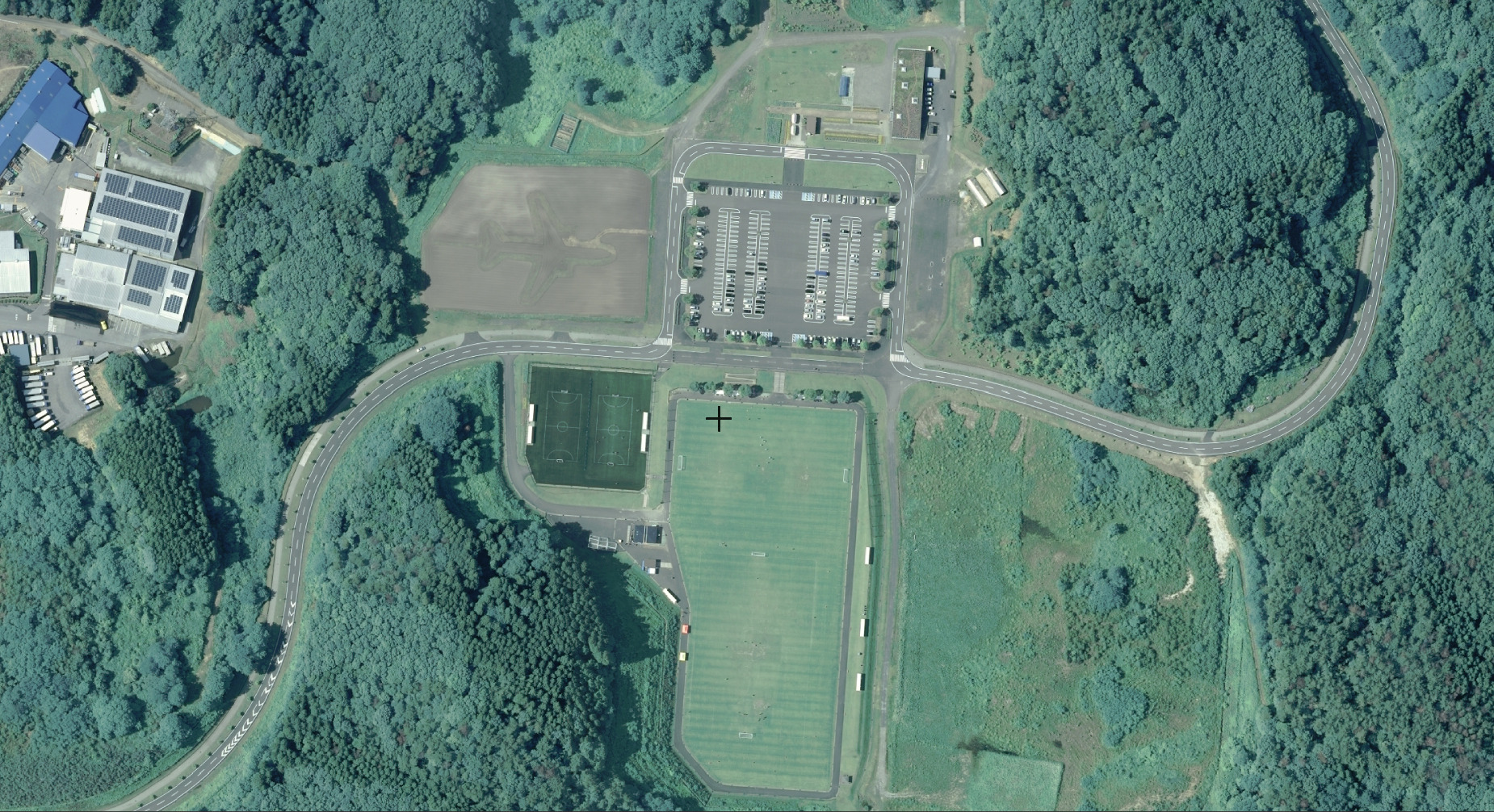
Fukushima Airport Park

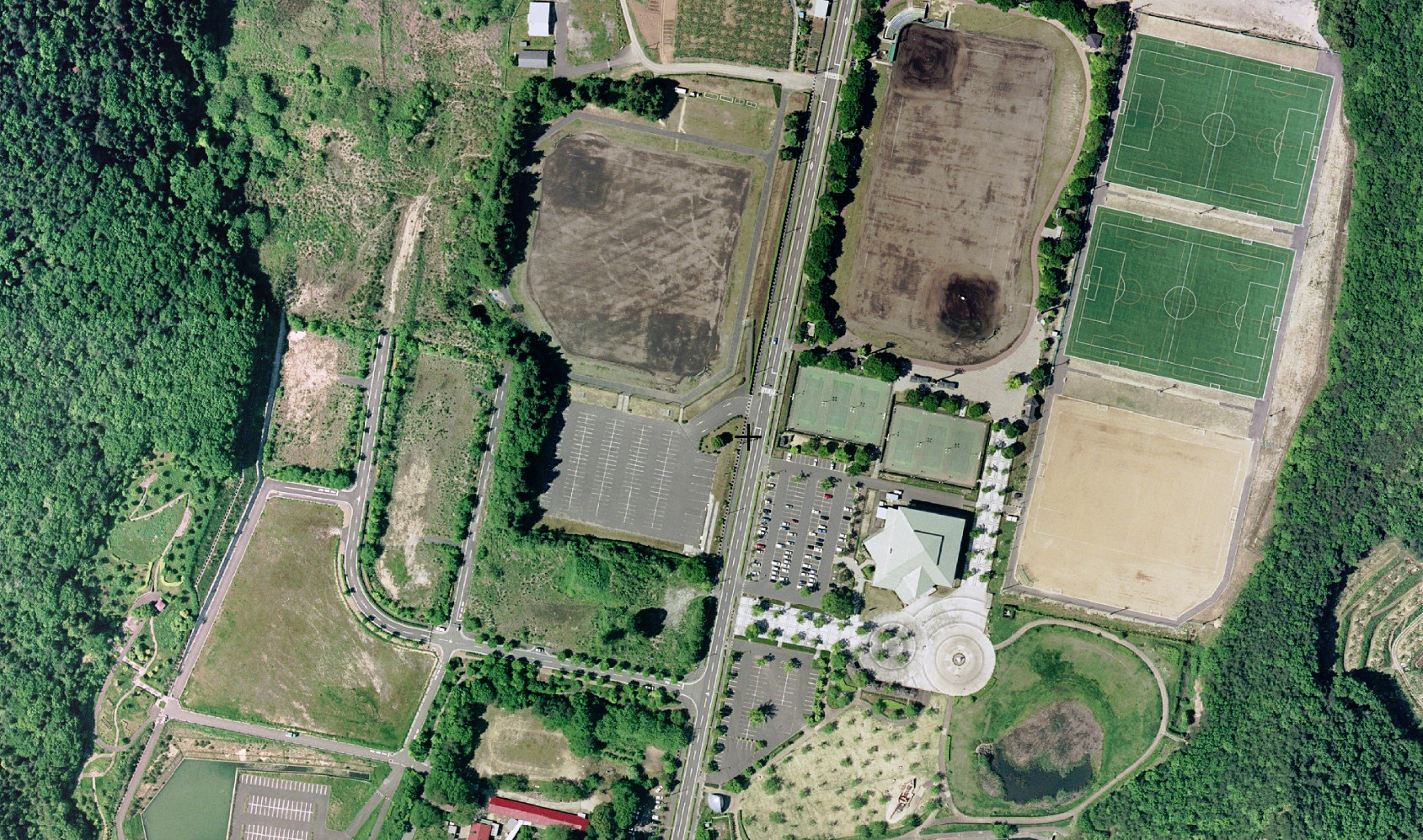
16numa Park

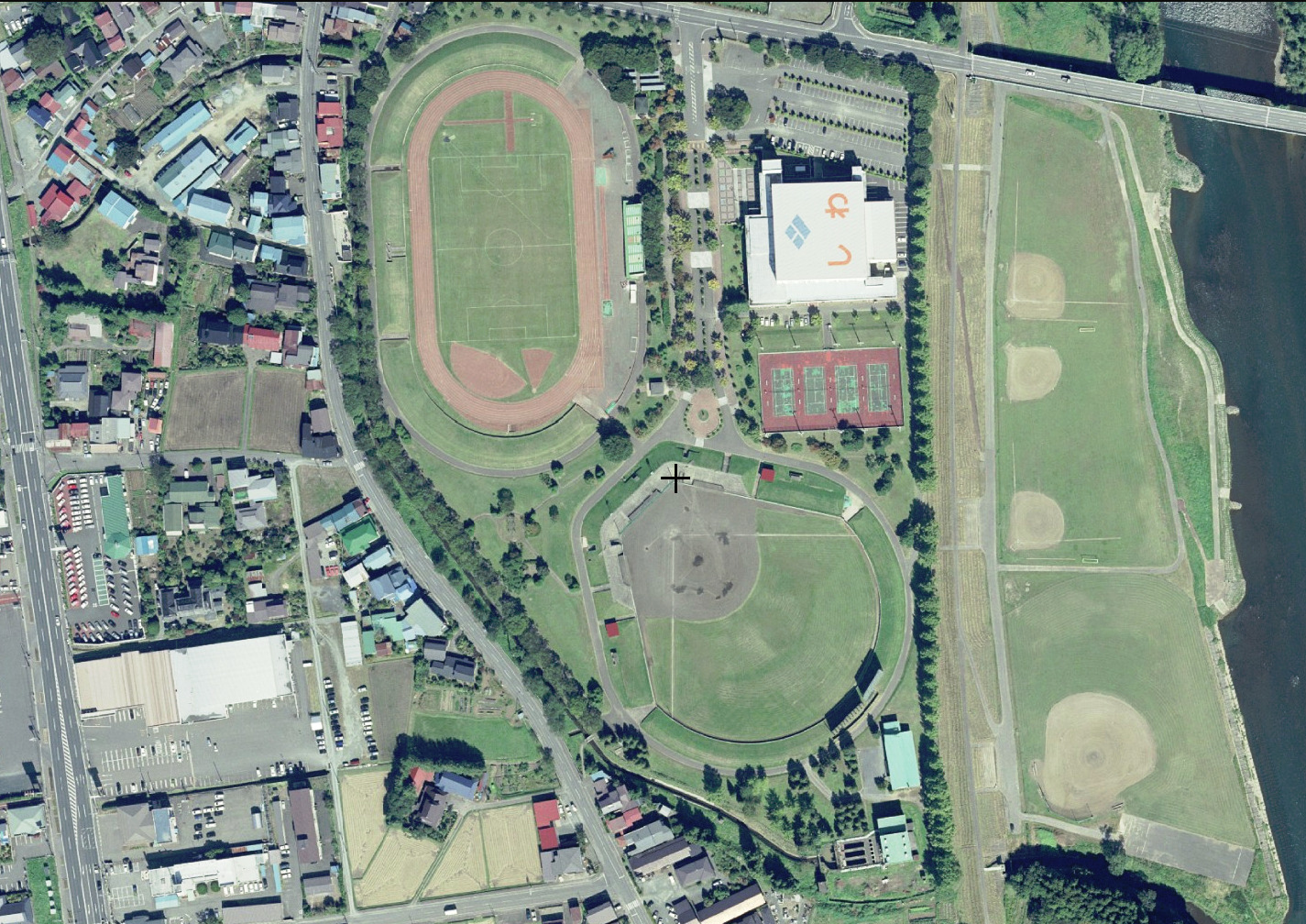
Shiwa Athletic Stadium

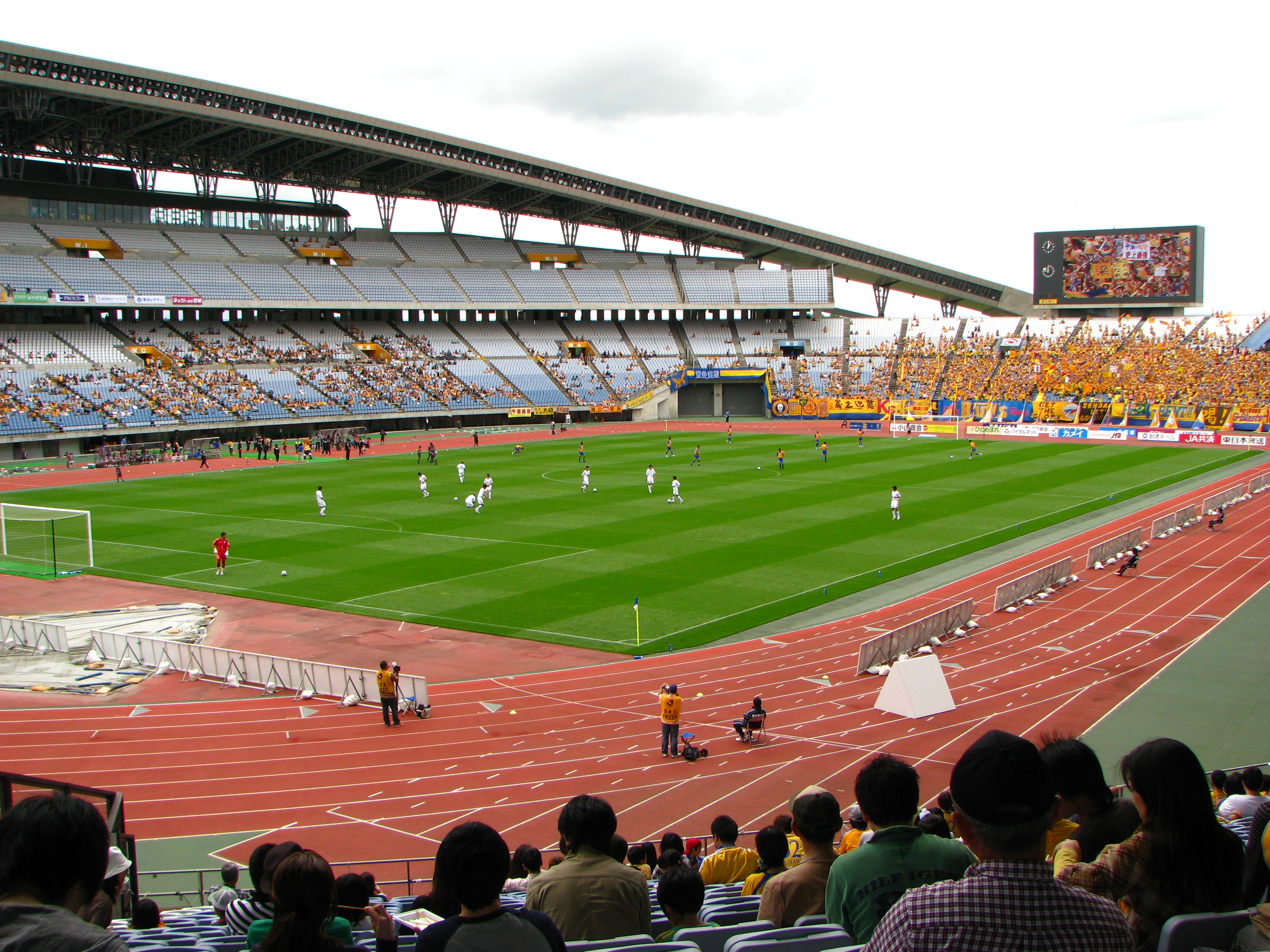
Q&A Stadium Miyagi

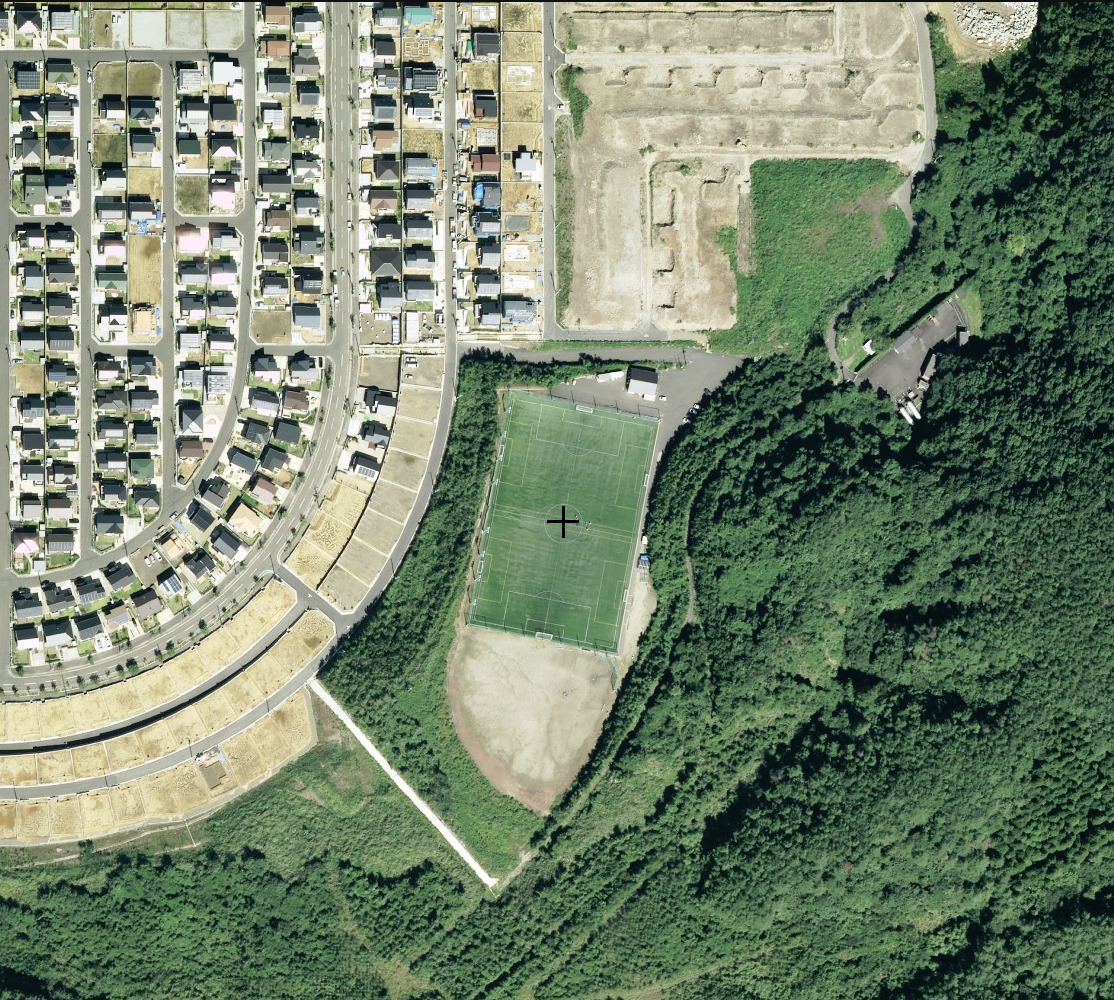
Adidas Sports Park

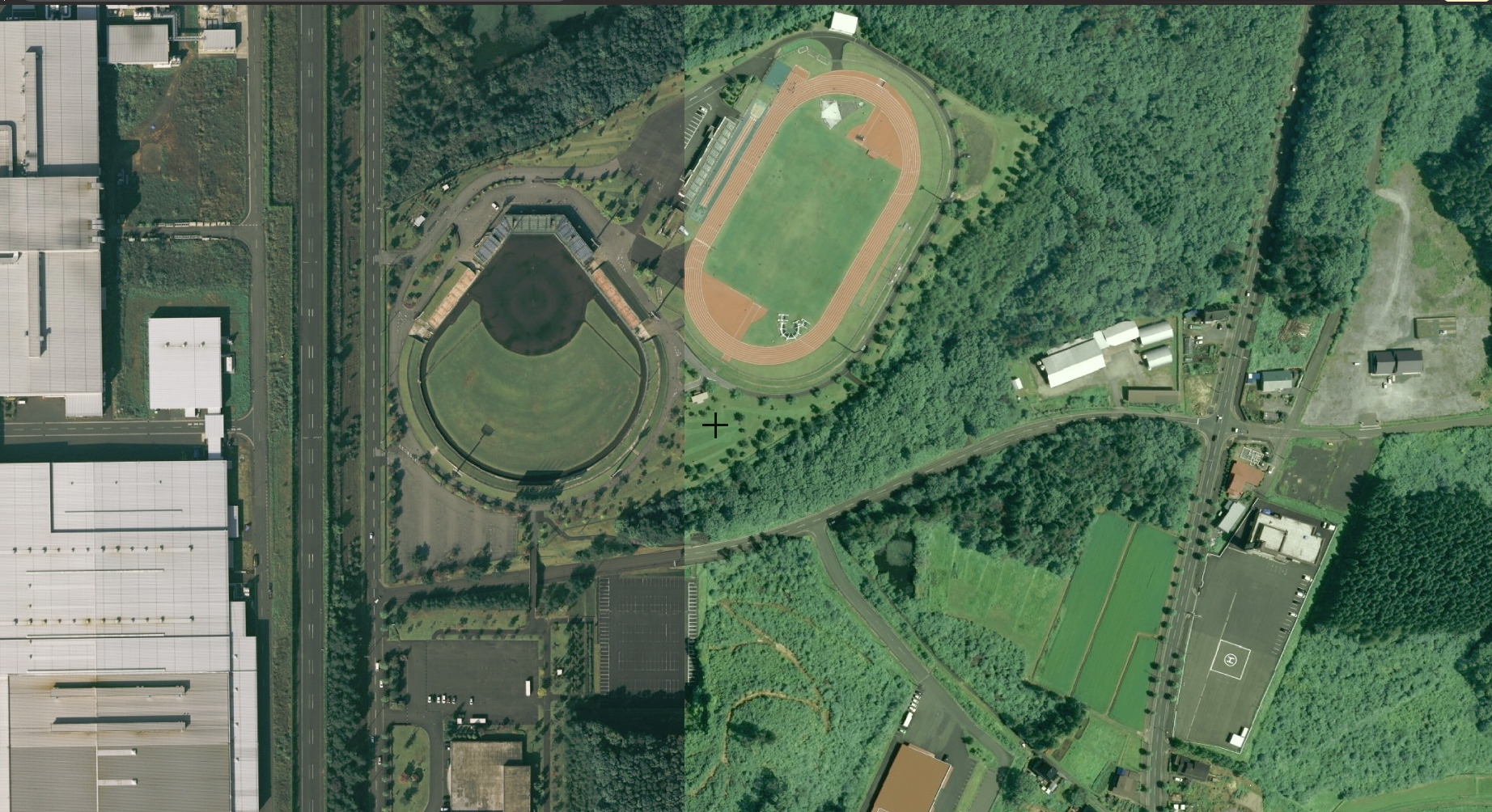
Moriyama General Park

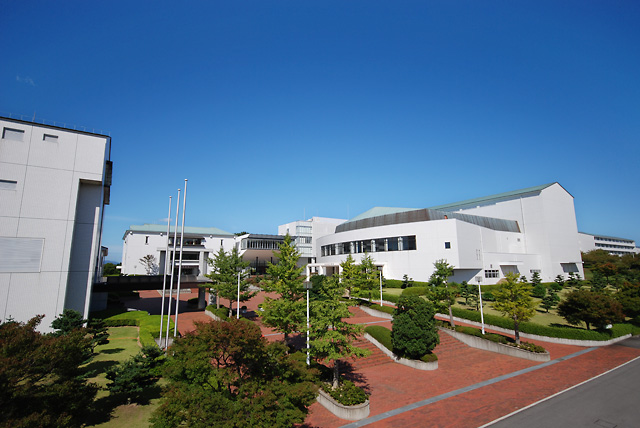
Iwaki Meisei University Ground

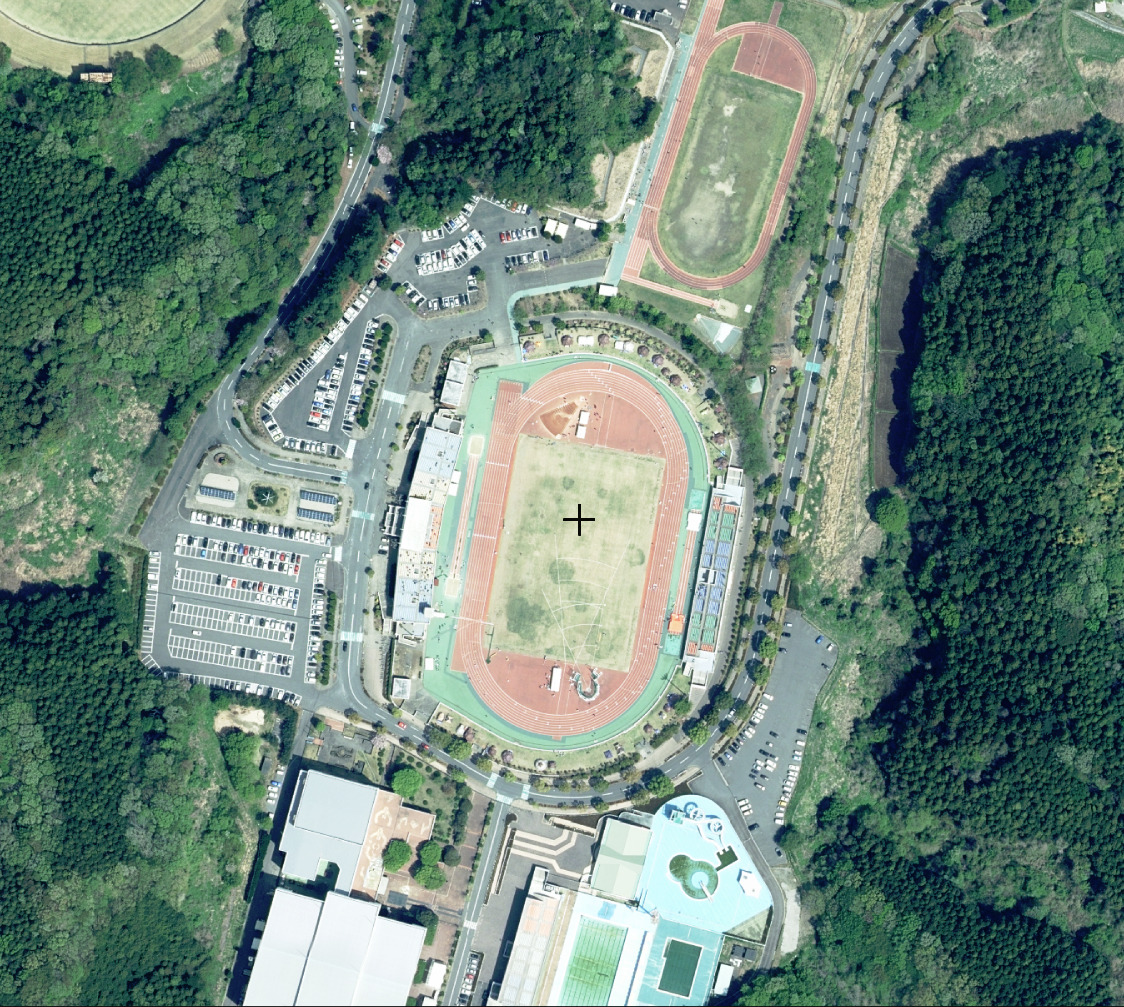
Iwaki Athletic Stadium

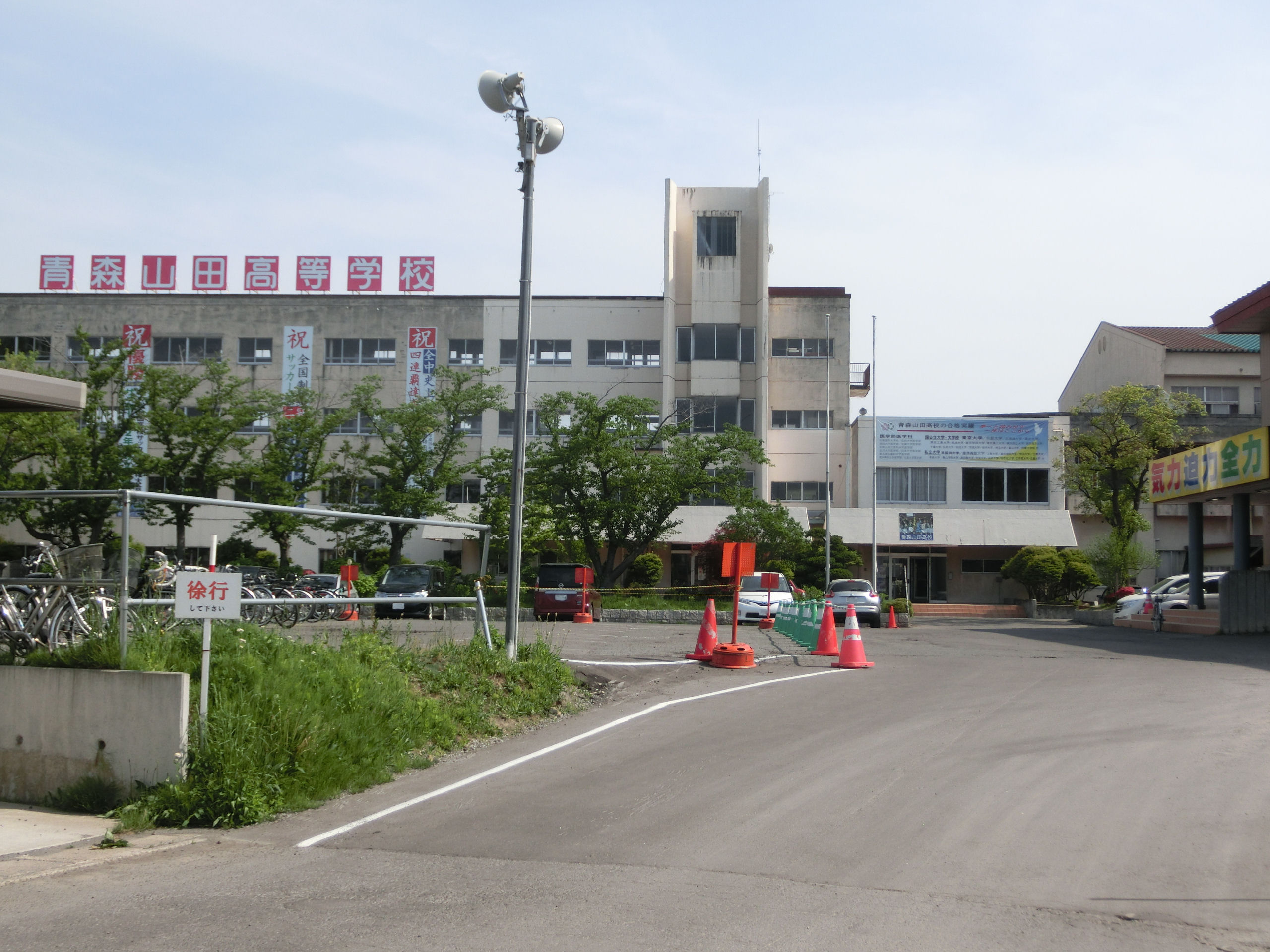
Aomori Yamada HS

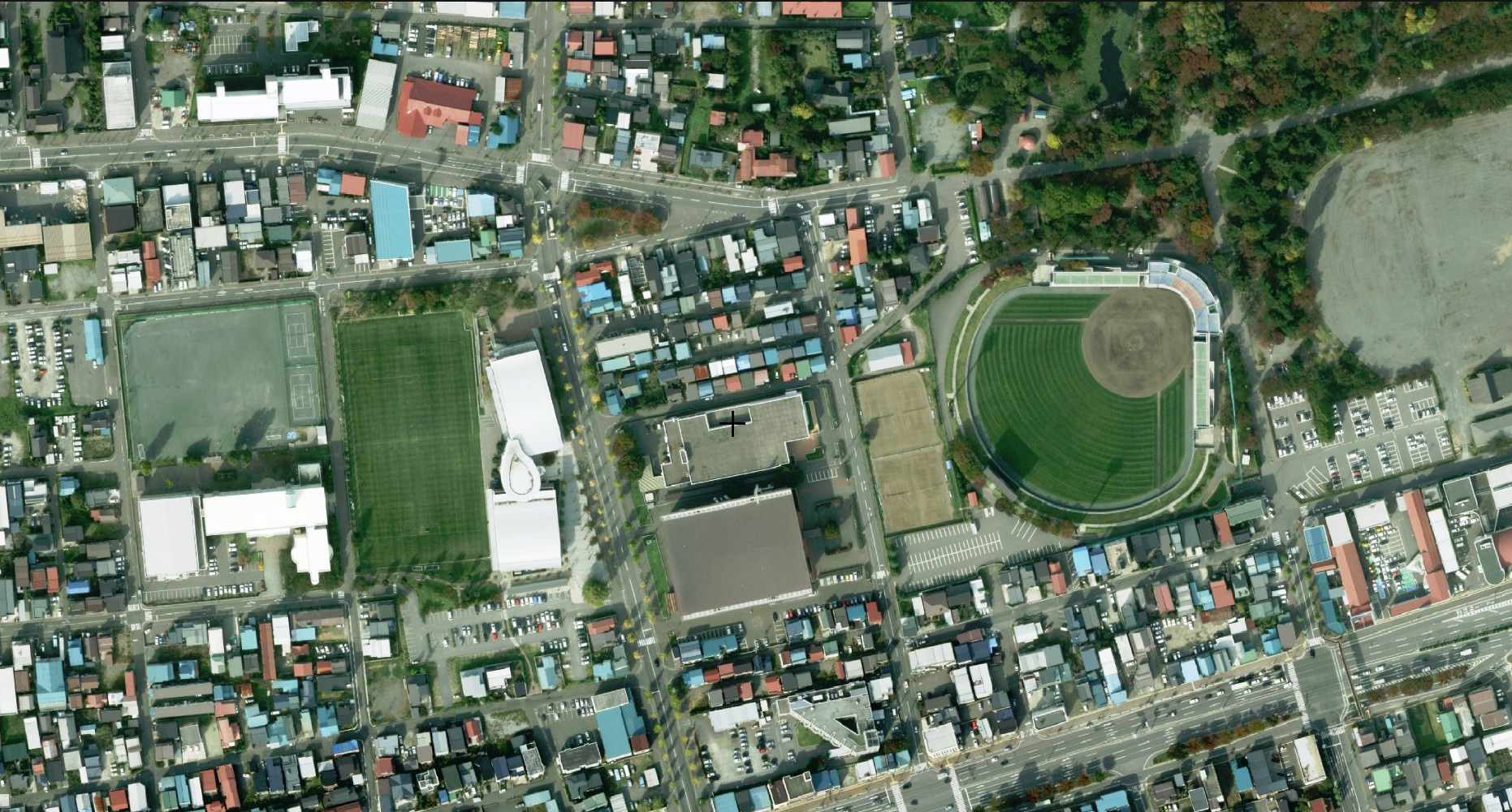
Michinoku Bank Dream Stadium

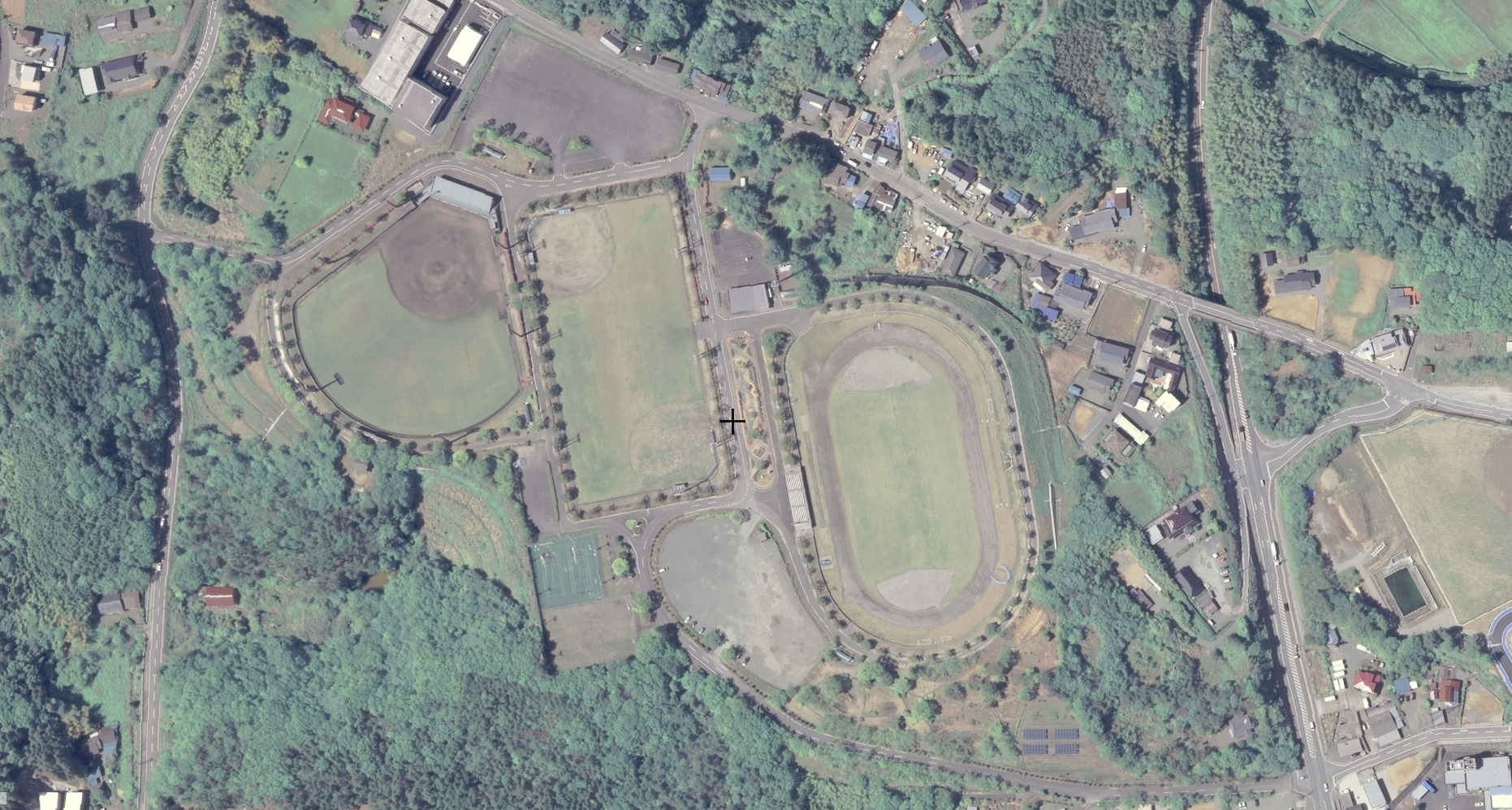
Naraha Athletic Stadium

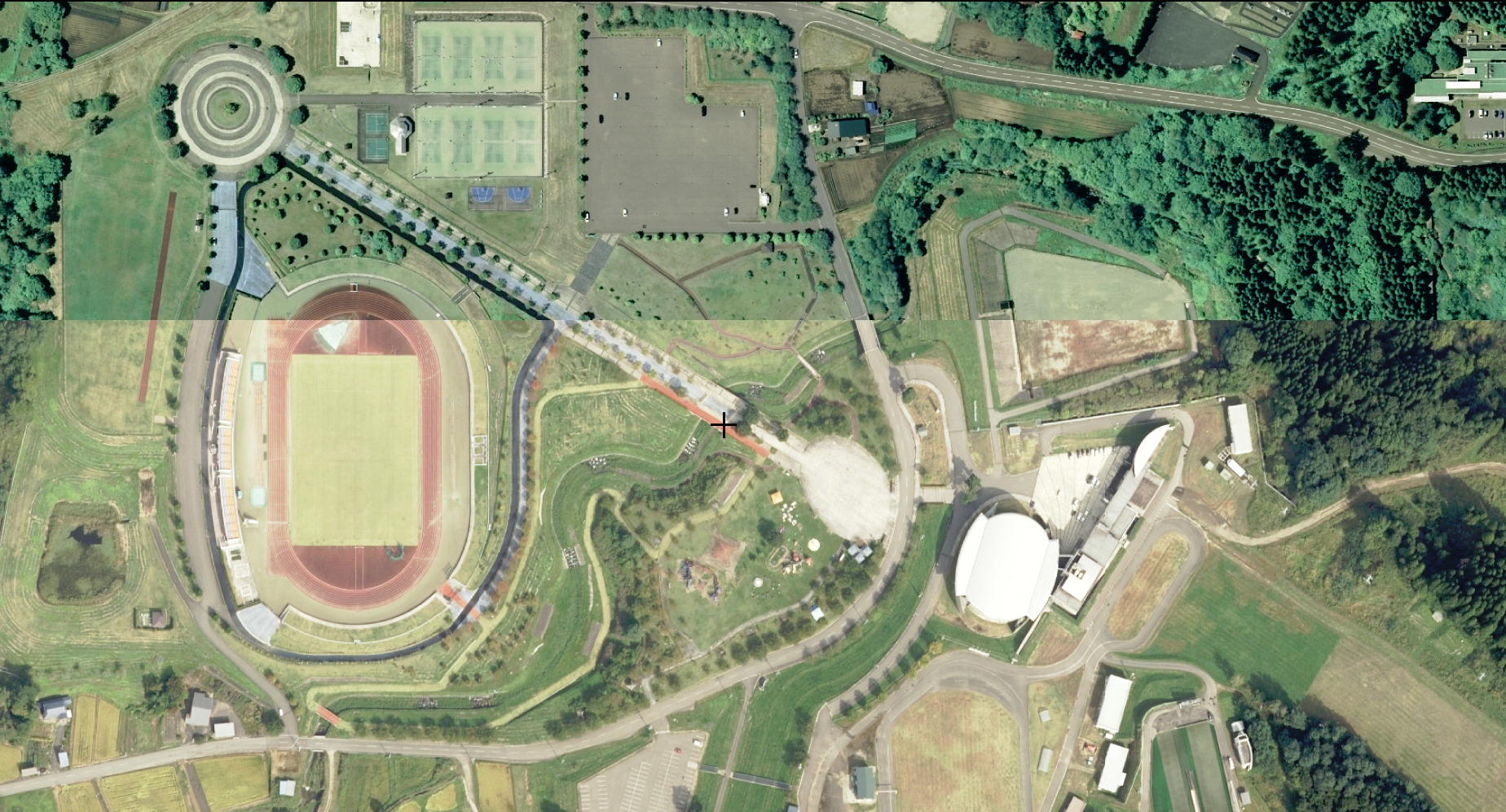
Kazuno Athletic Stadium

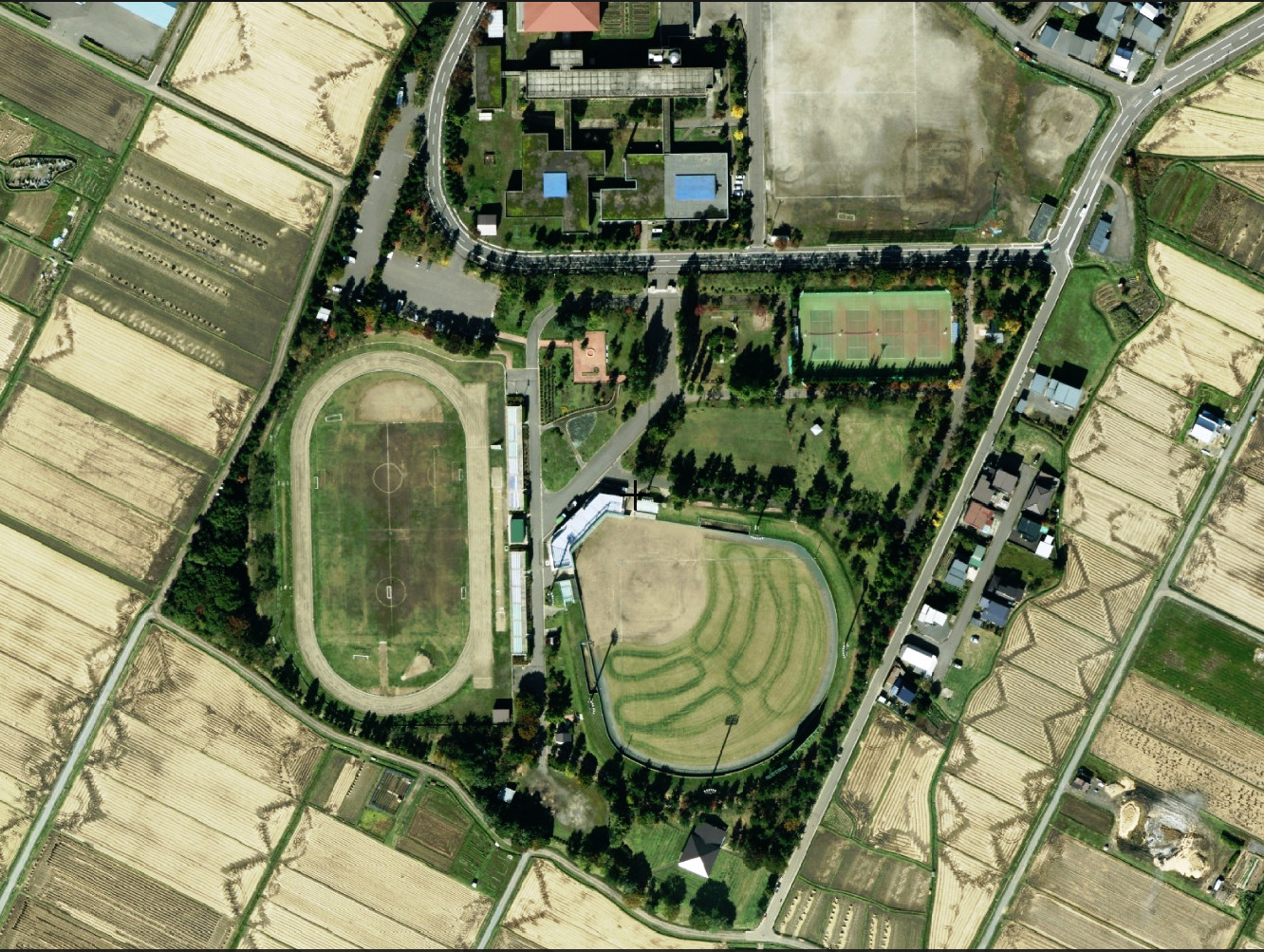
Namioka Athletic Stadium

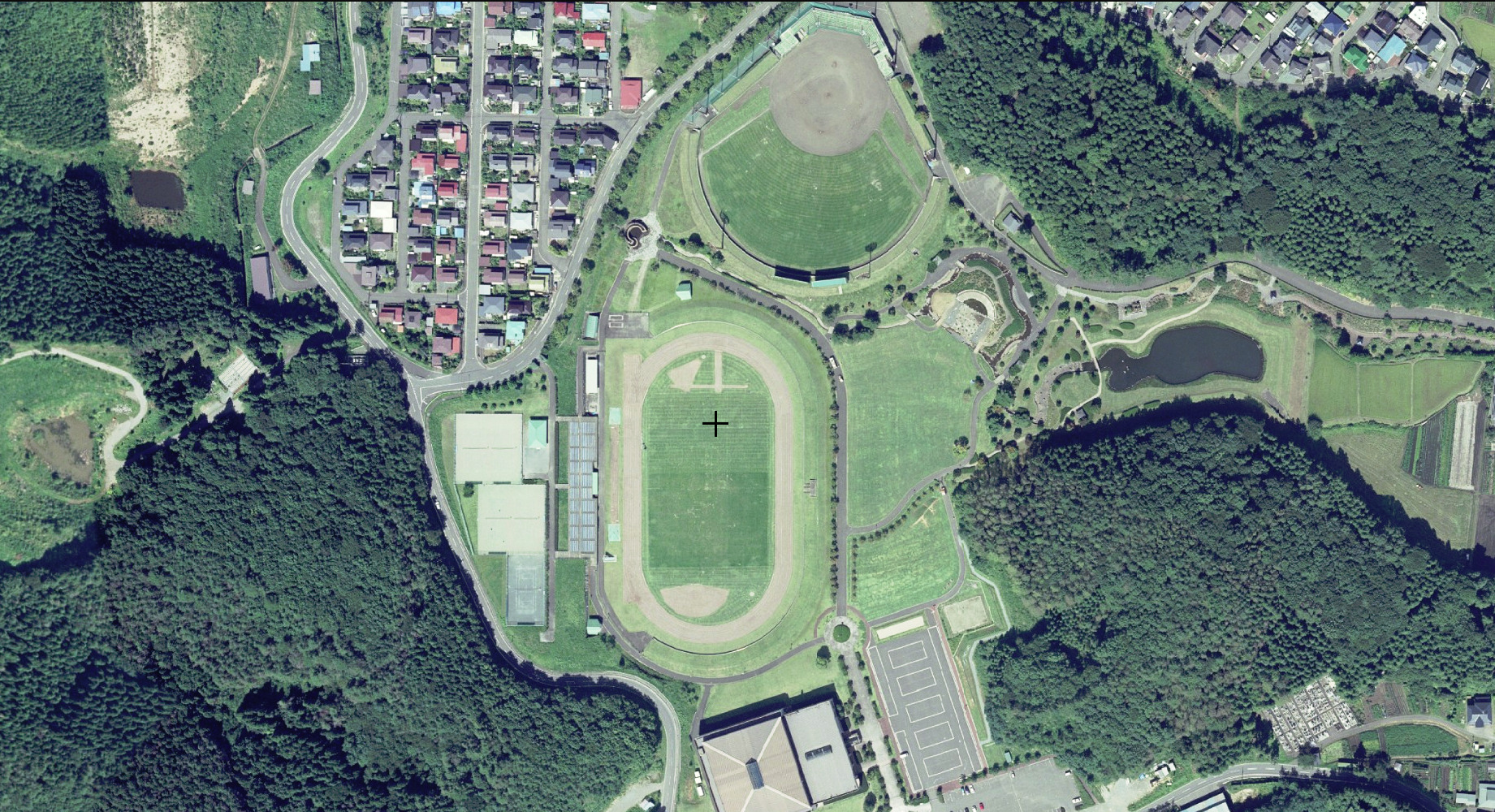
Takizawa Athletic Stadium

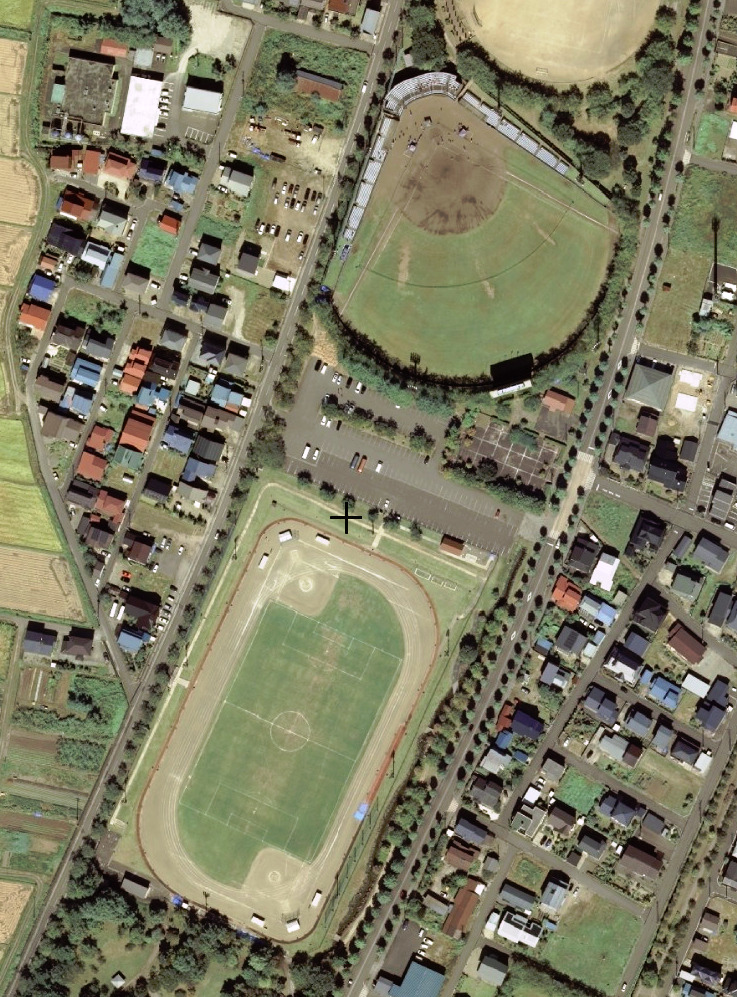
Oshikirigawa Park

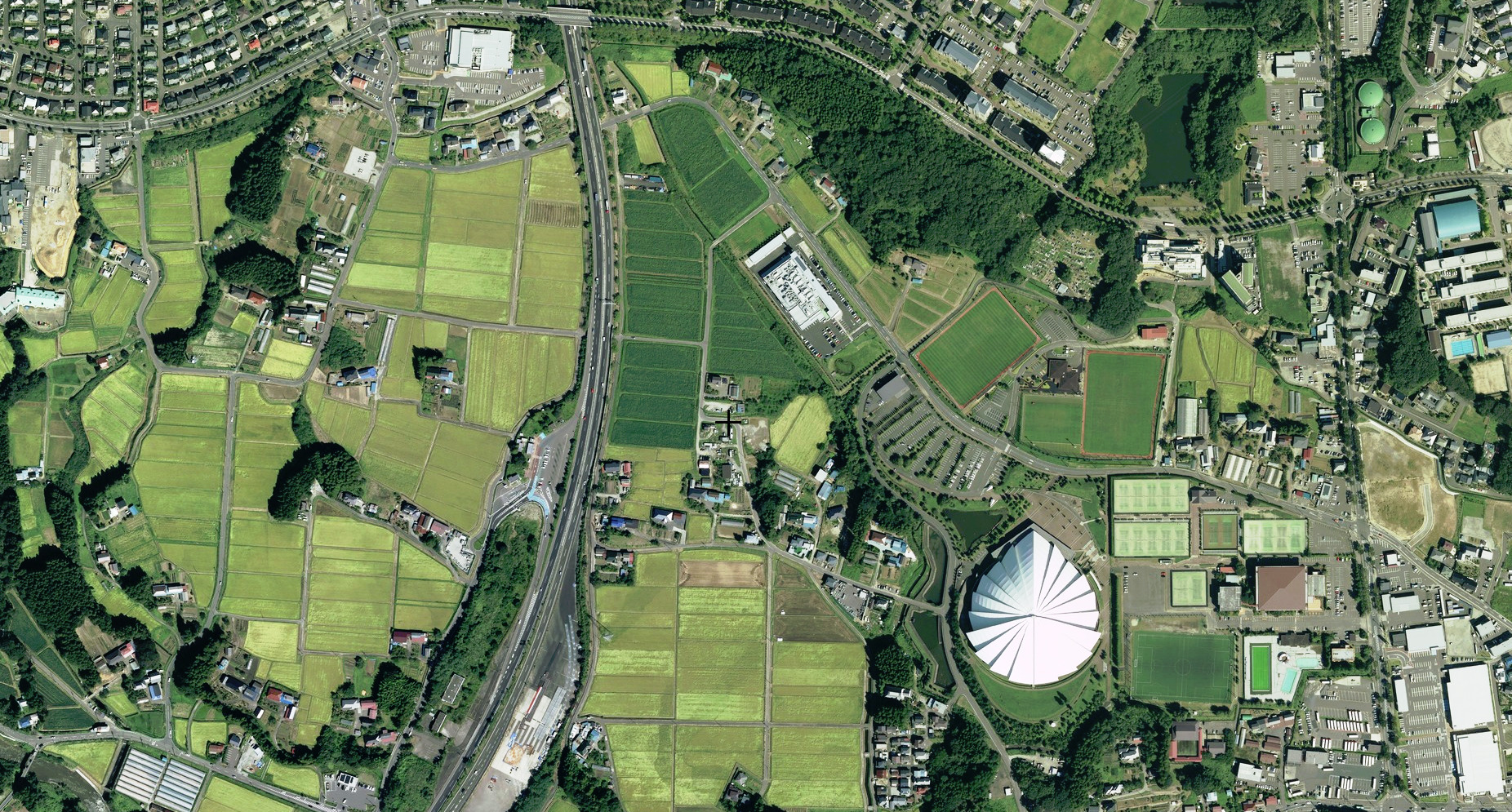
Izumi Sports Grounds

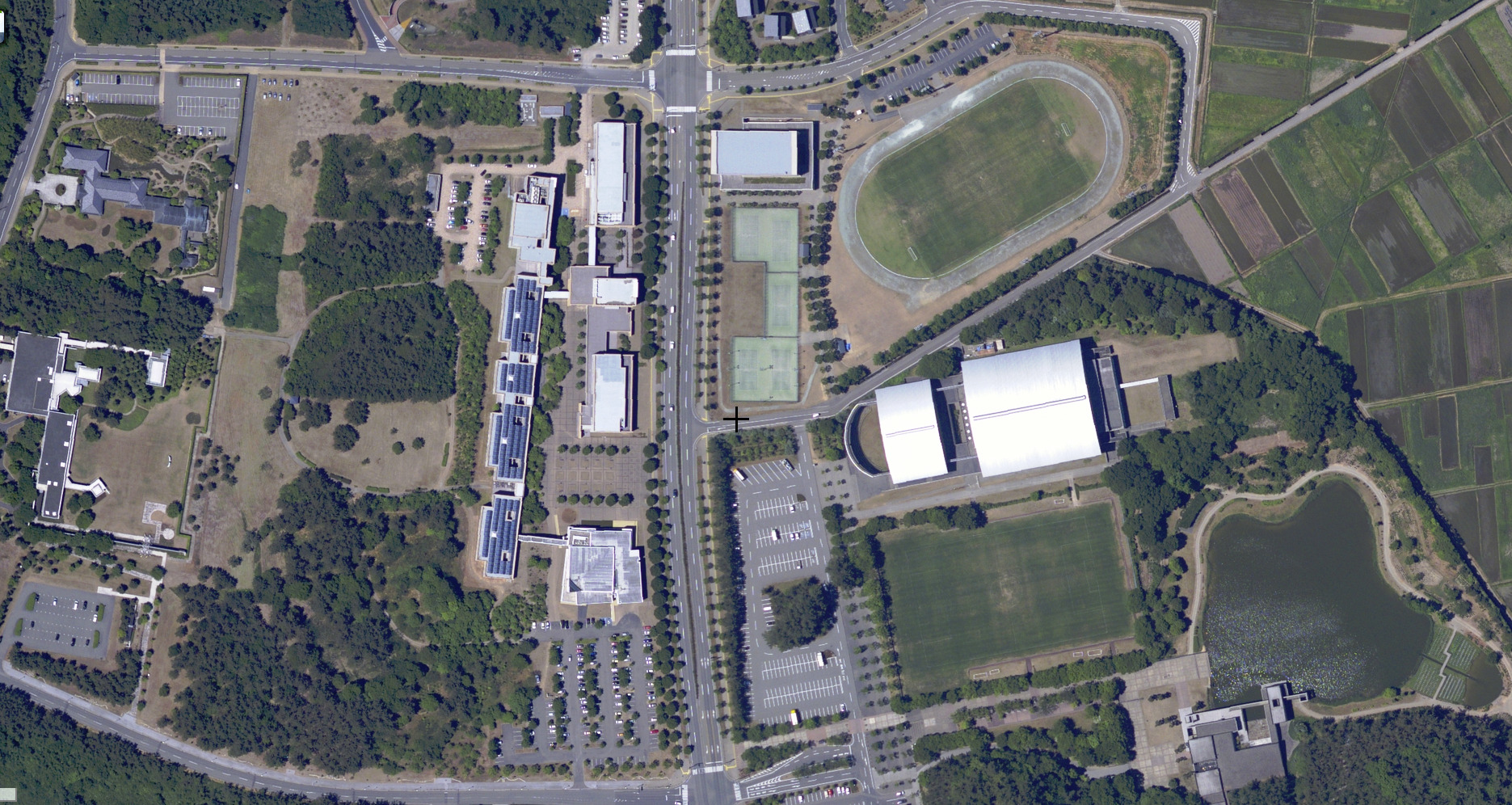
Iimoriyama Park

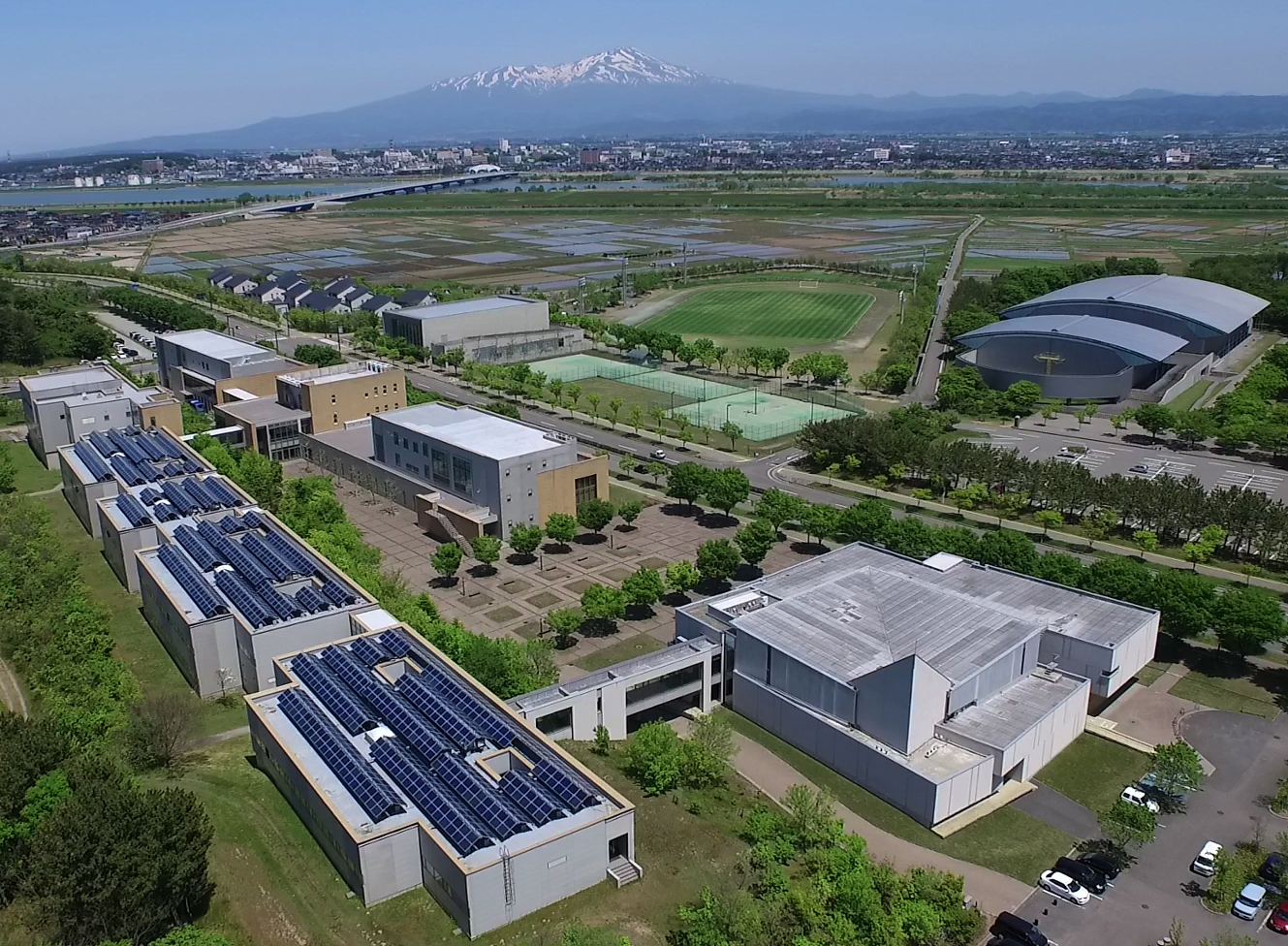
Tohoku University of Community Service and Science

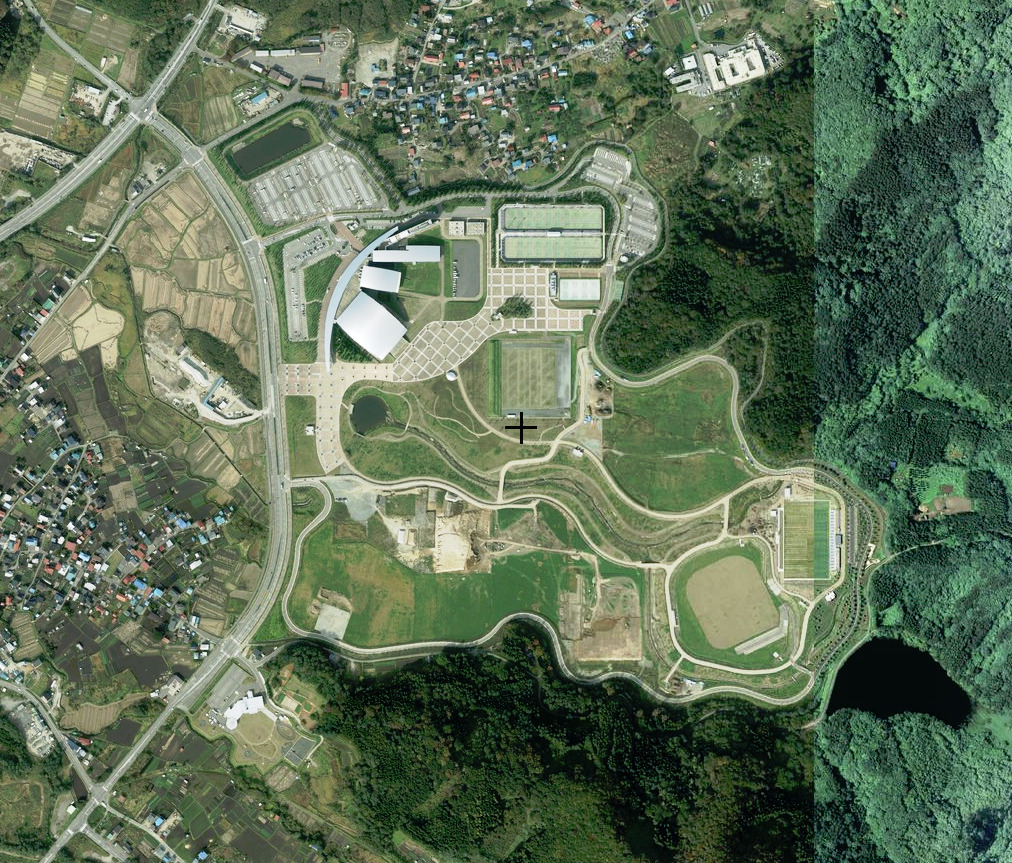
New Aomori General Sports Park

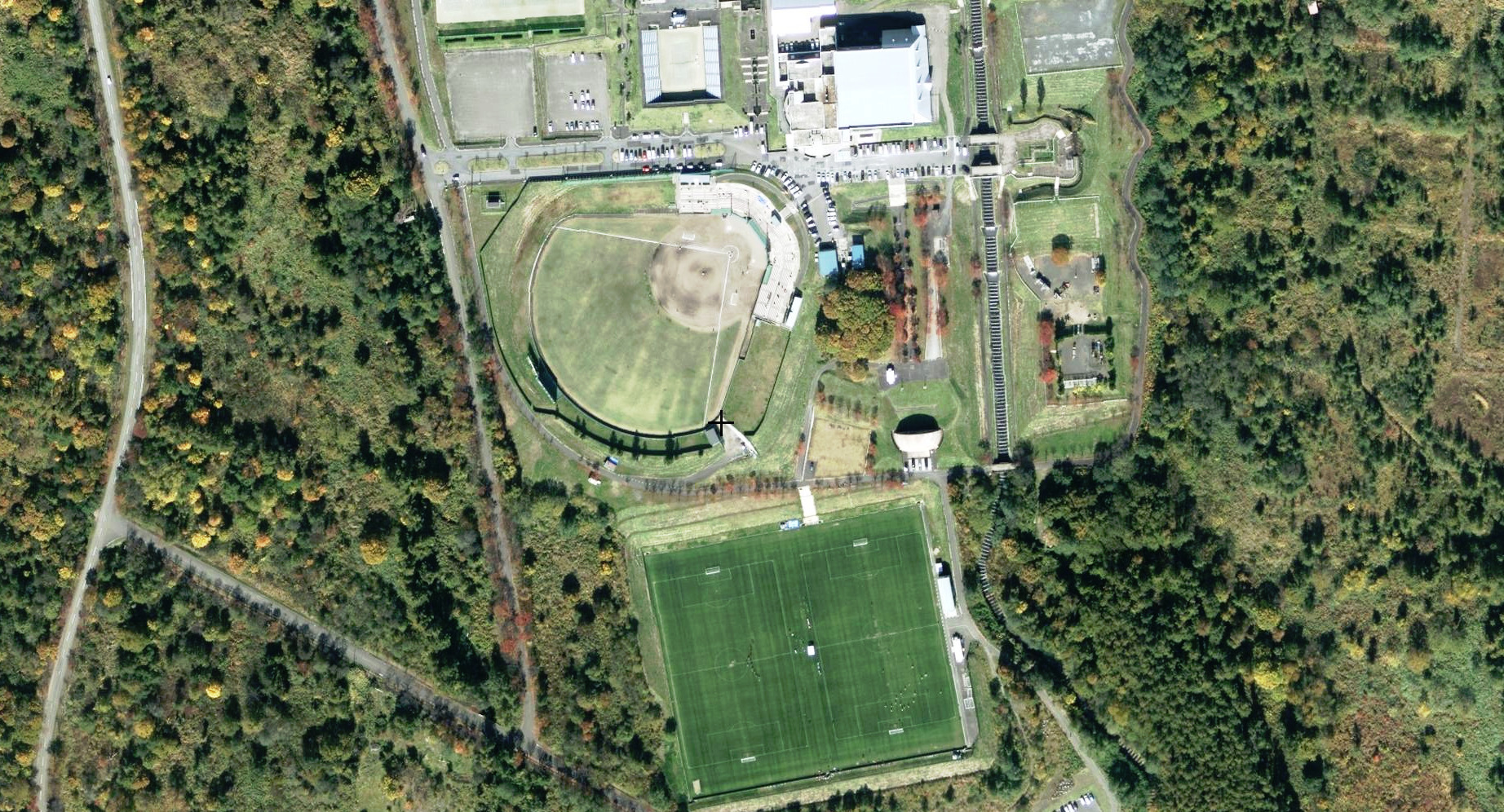
Iwakisan General Park

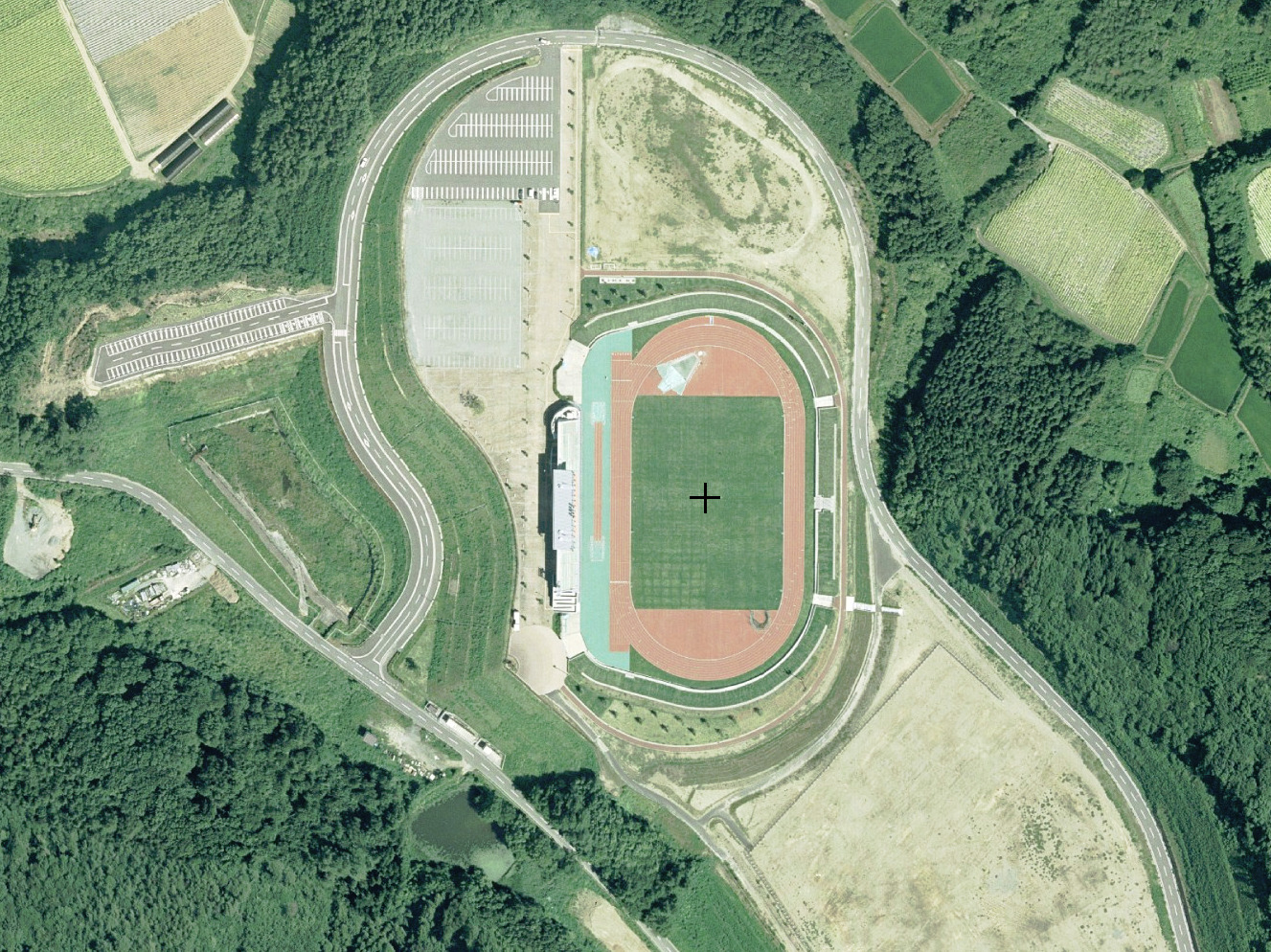
Tamura Athletic Stadium

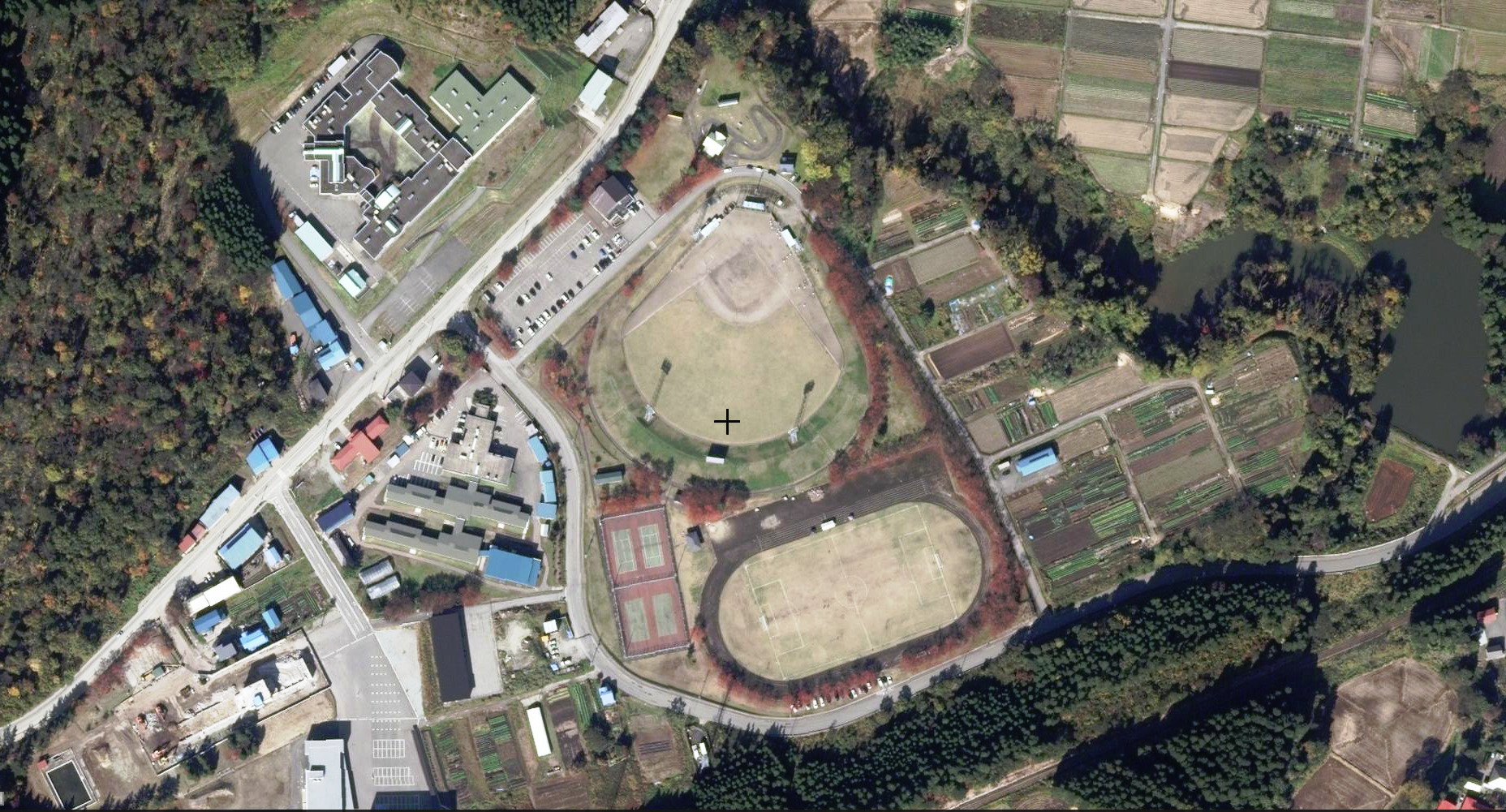
Tozawa Youth Centre

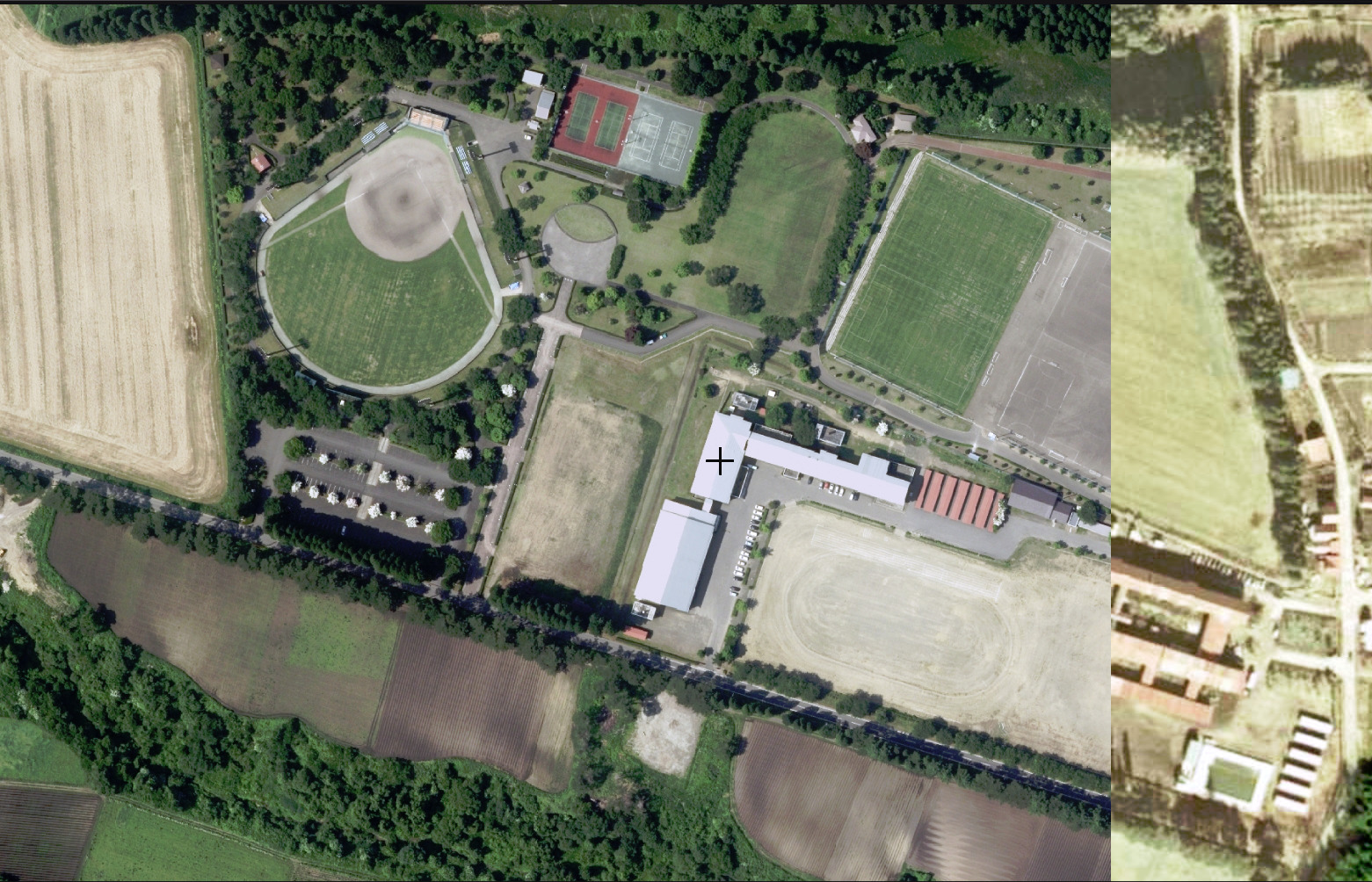
Shichinohe Sports Park

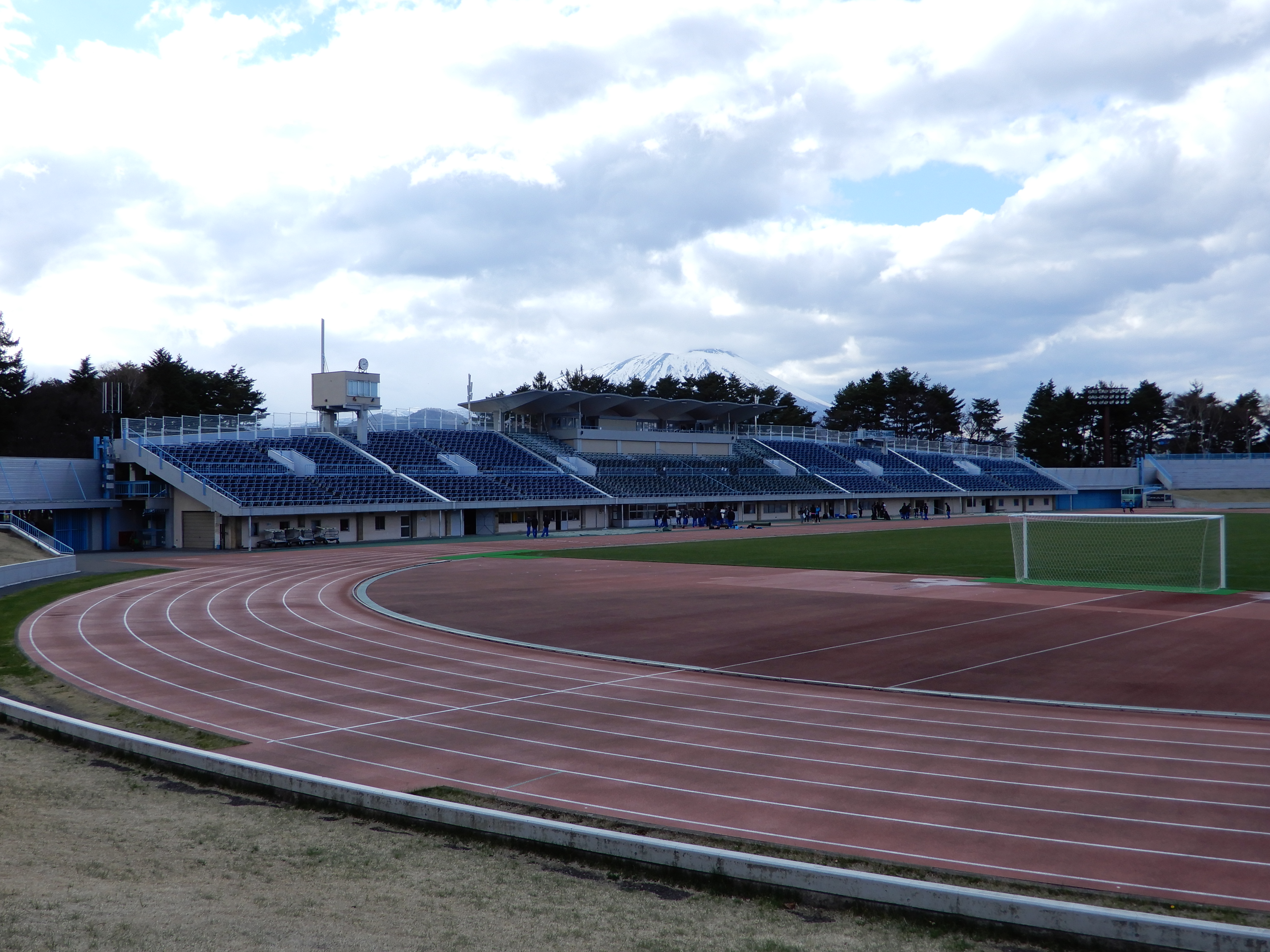
Iwate Sports Park Playing Field

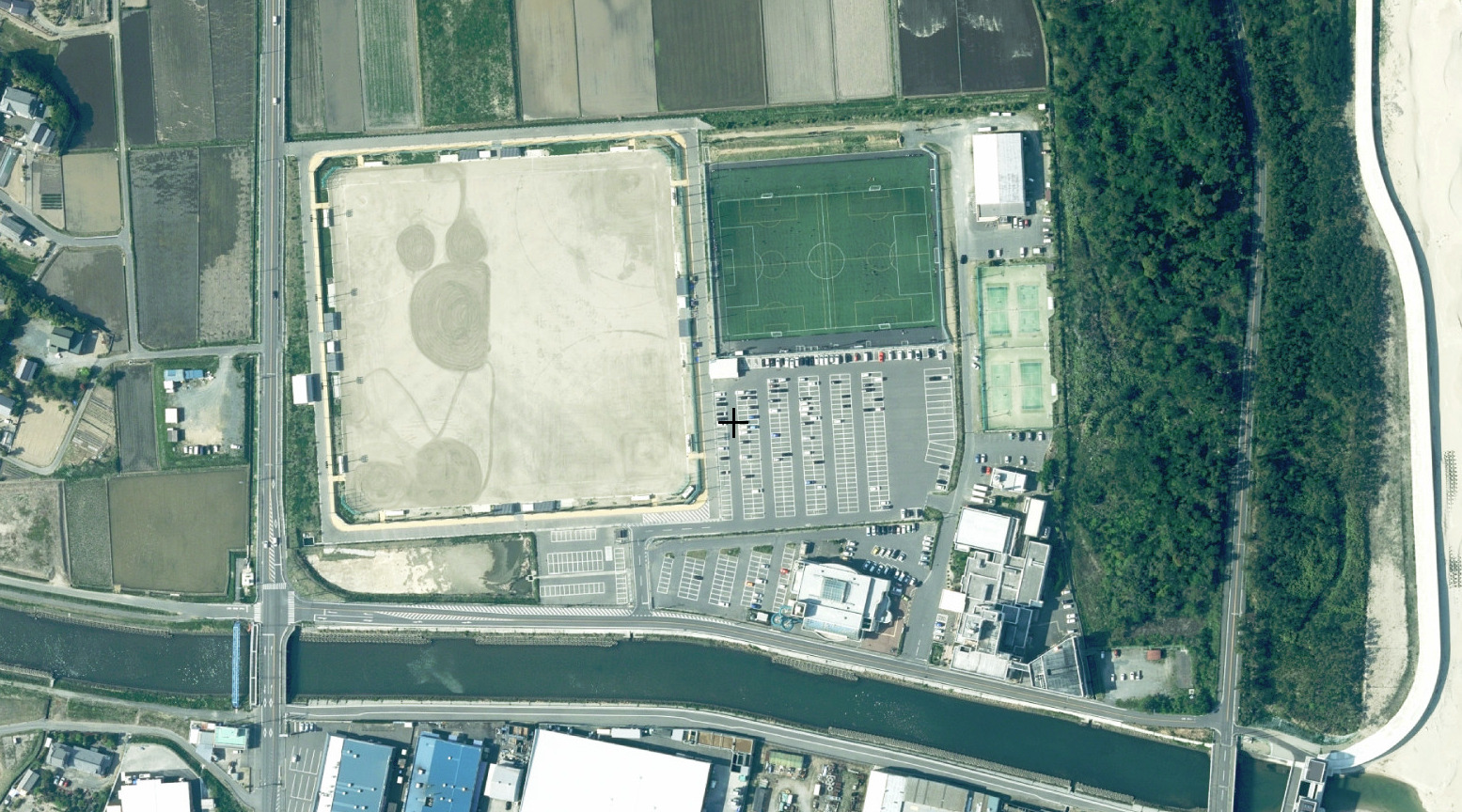
Shinmaiko Football Field

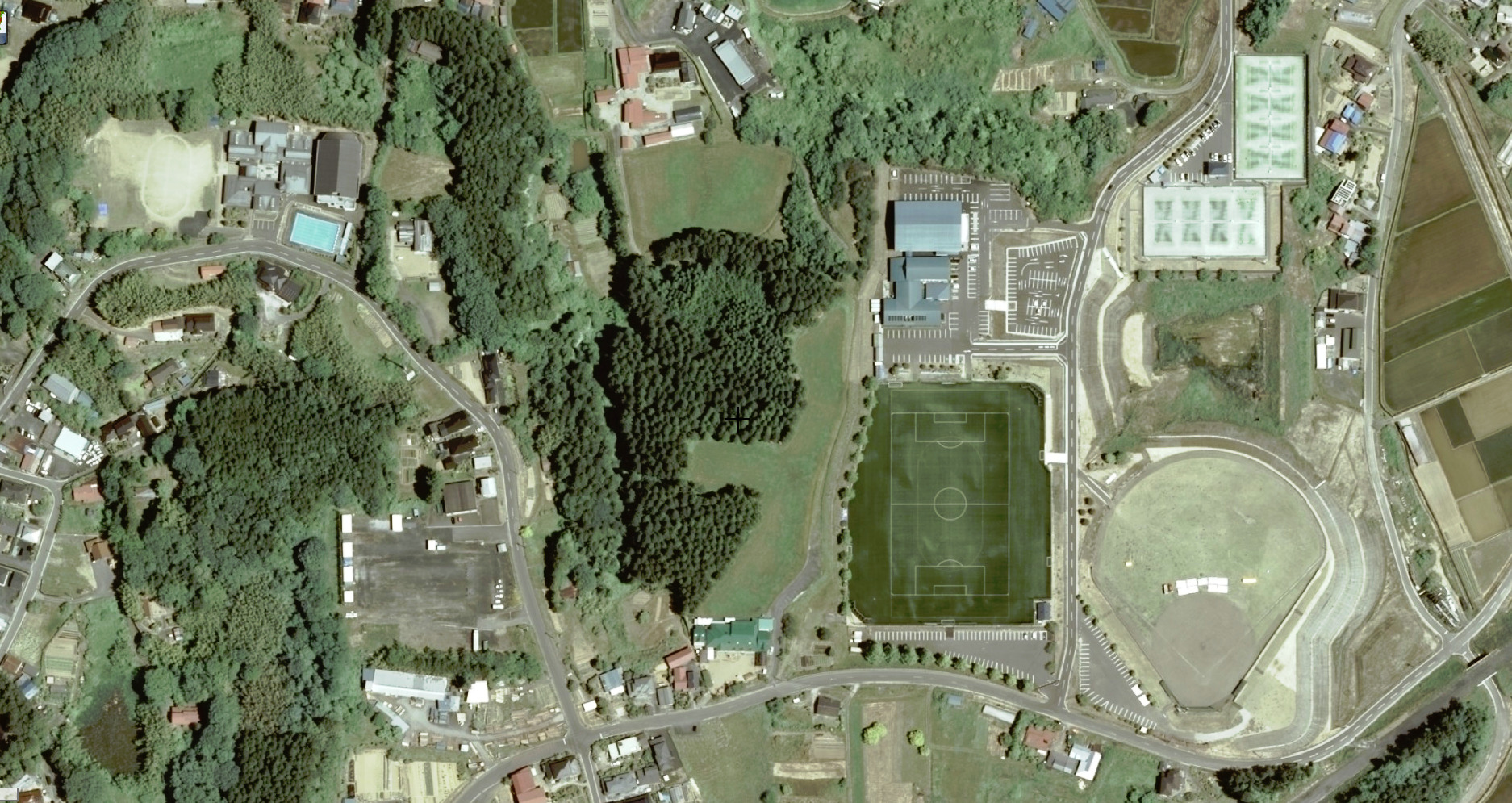
Towa Sports Park

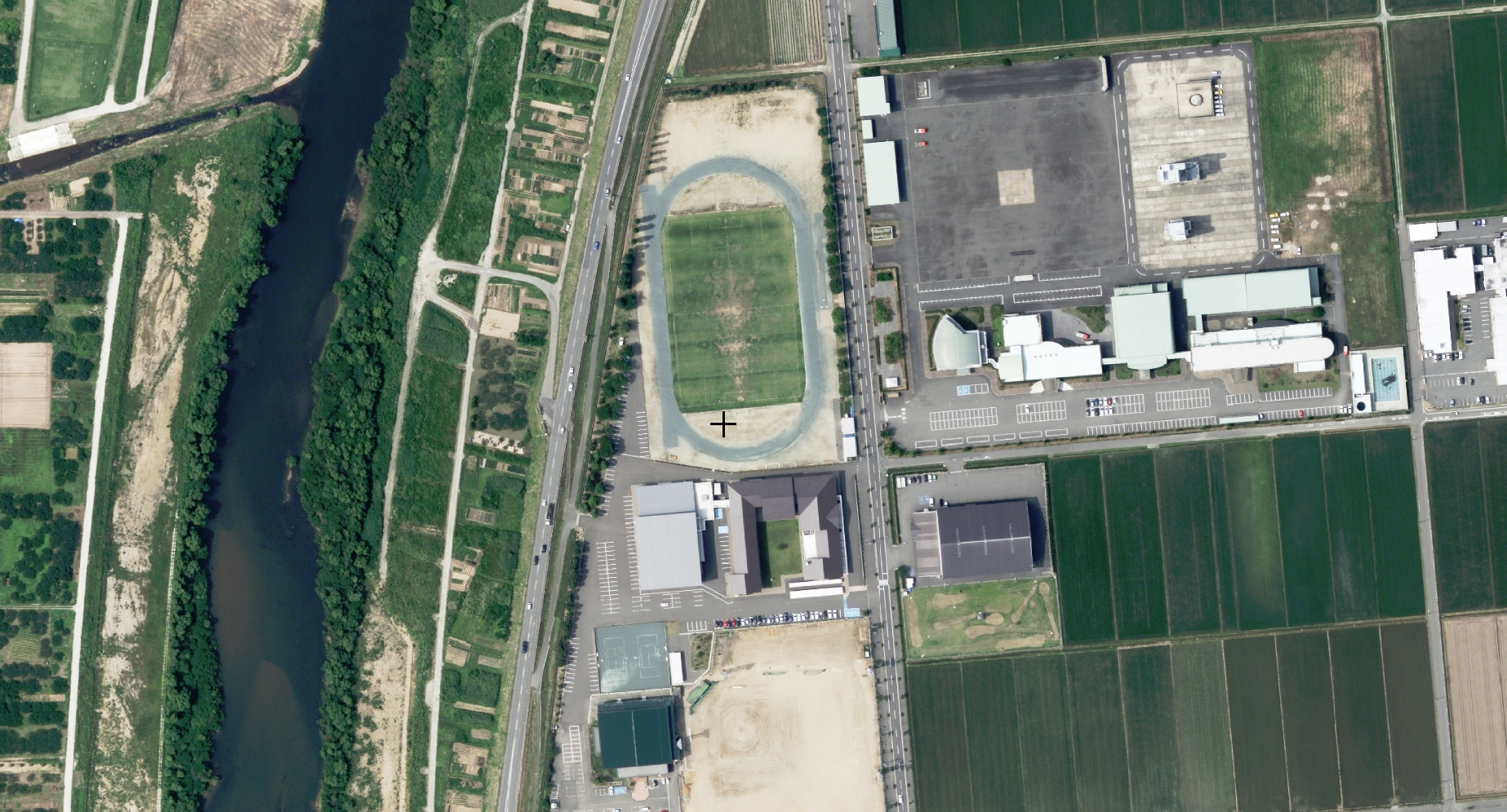
Mikawa JHS Field

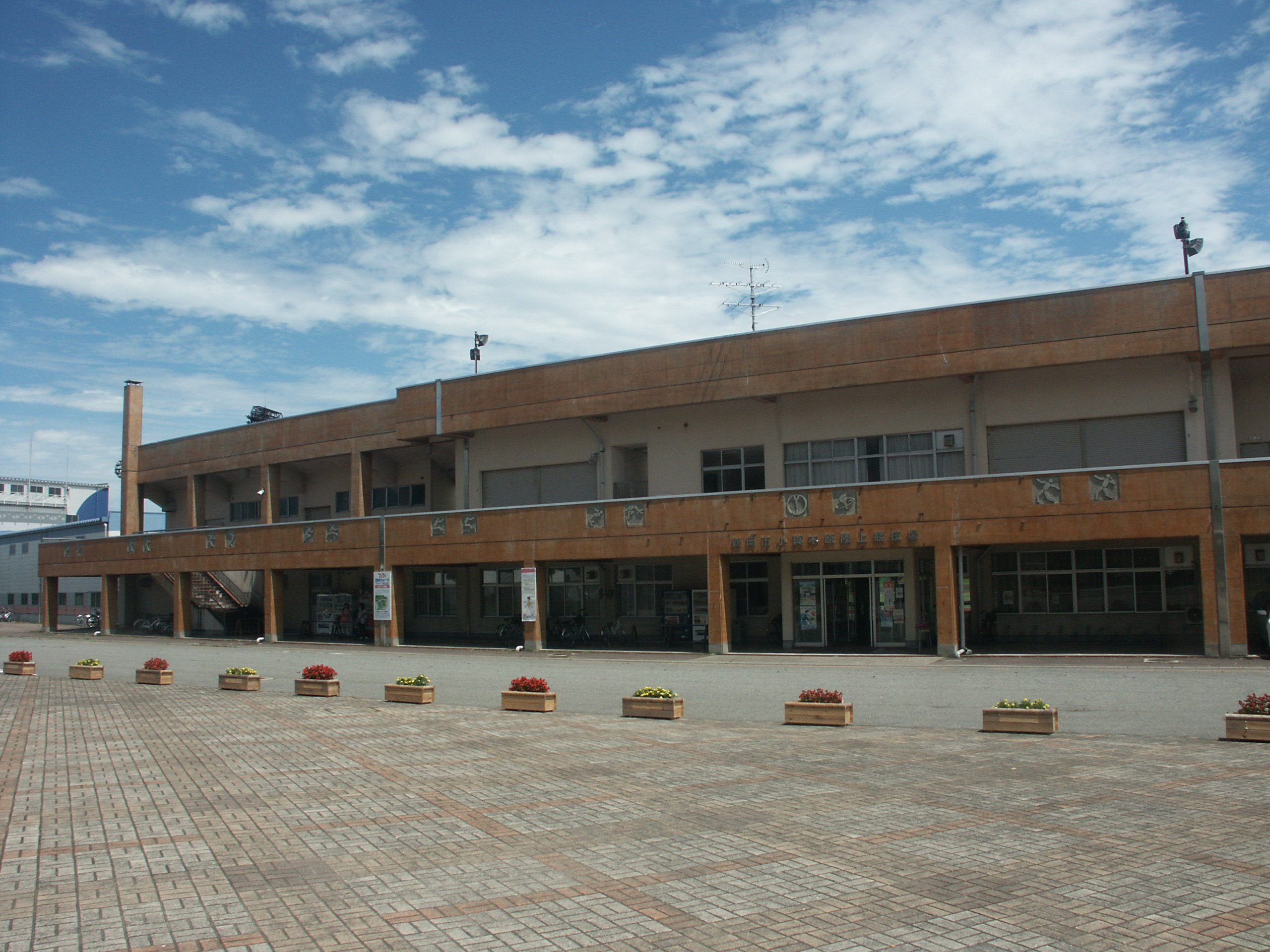
Tsuruoka Athletic Stadium

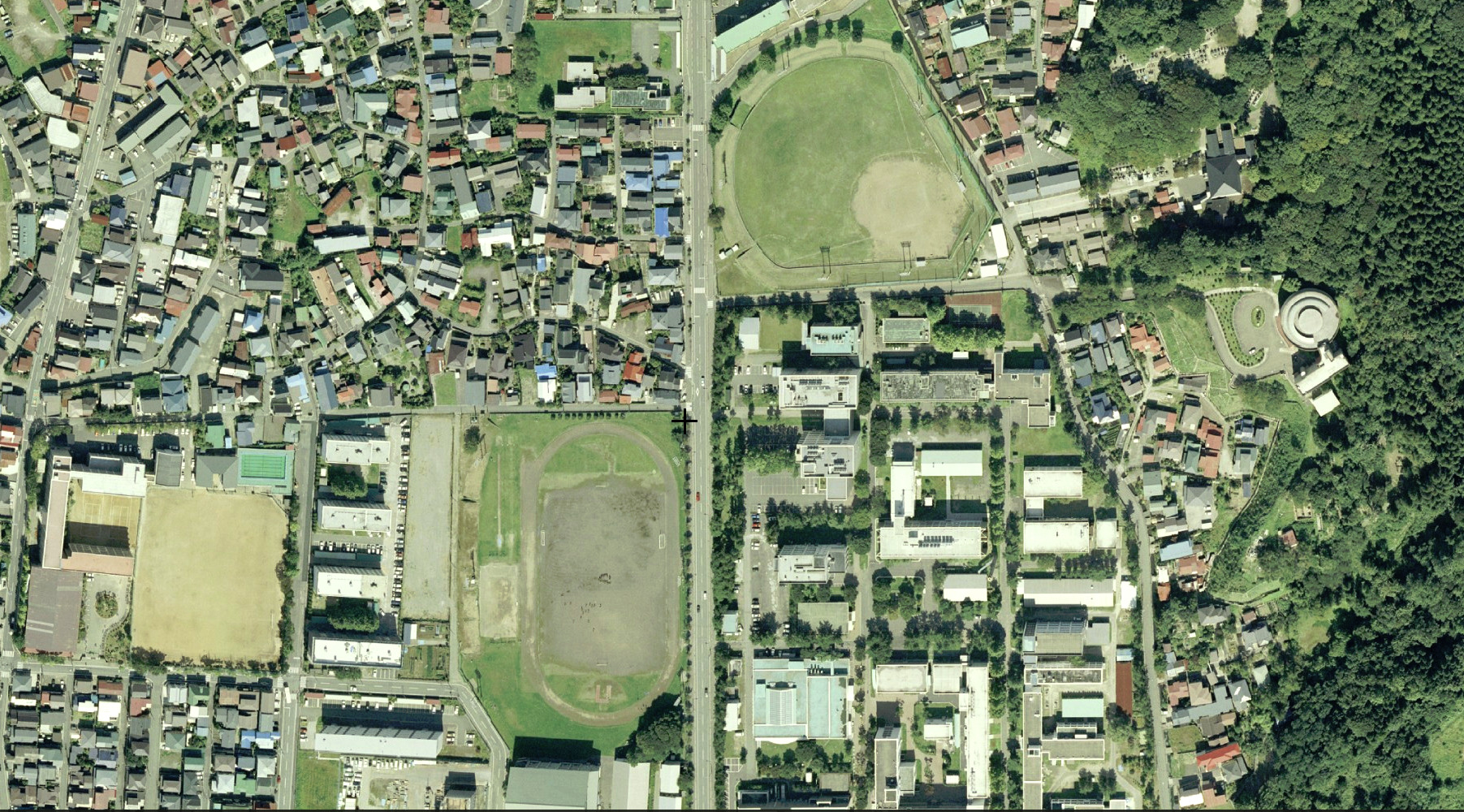
Akita University Athletic Field

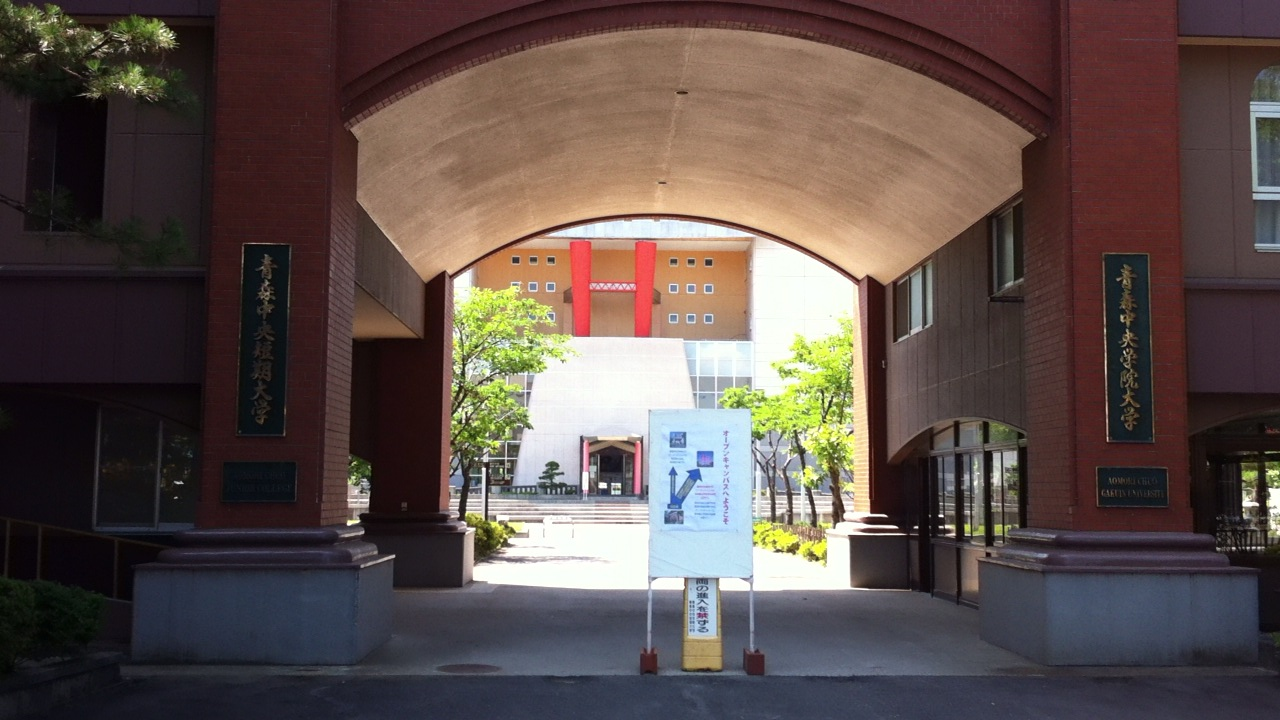
Aomori Chuo Gakuin University

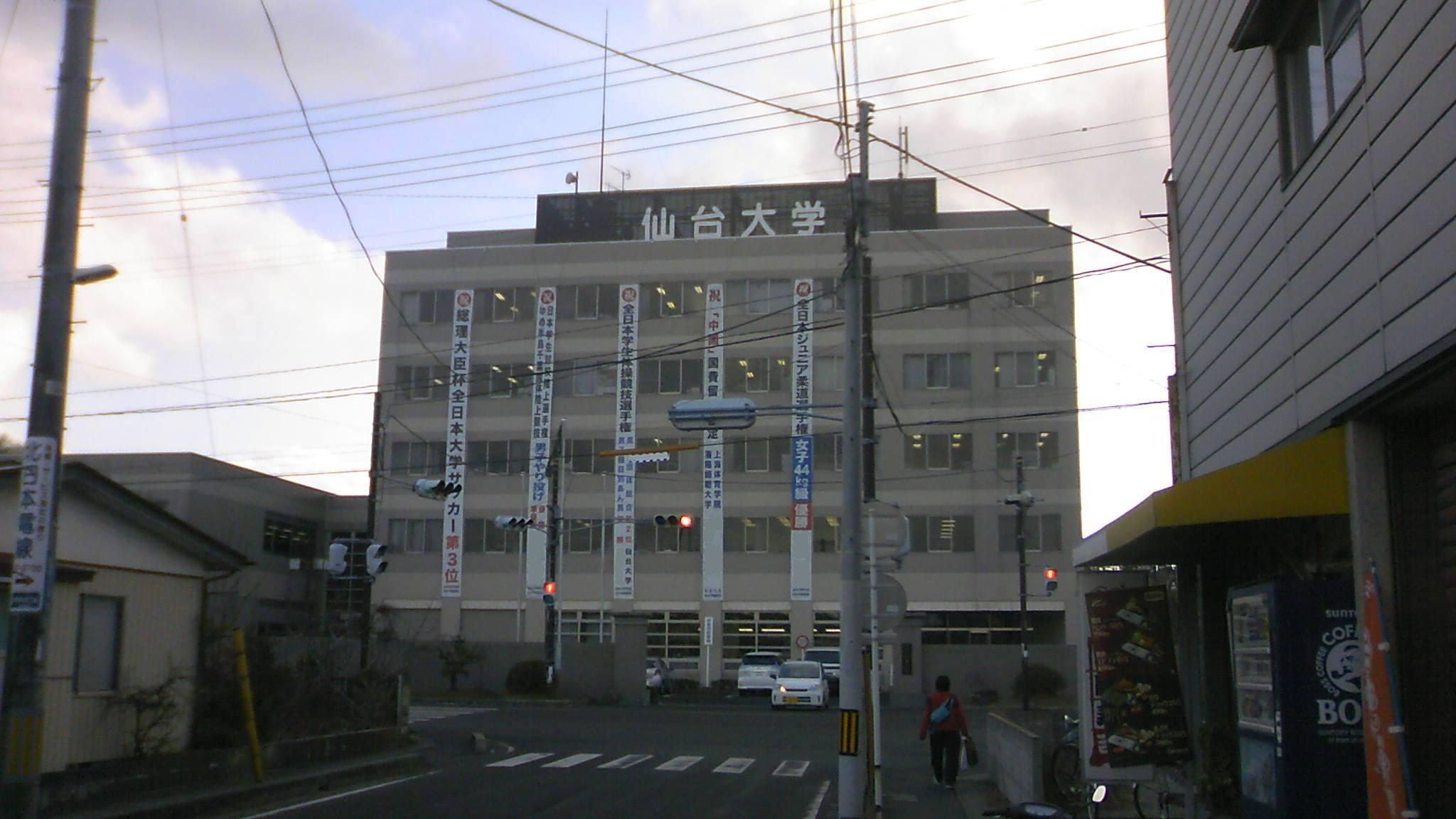
Sendai University

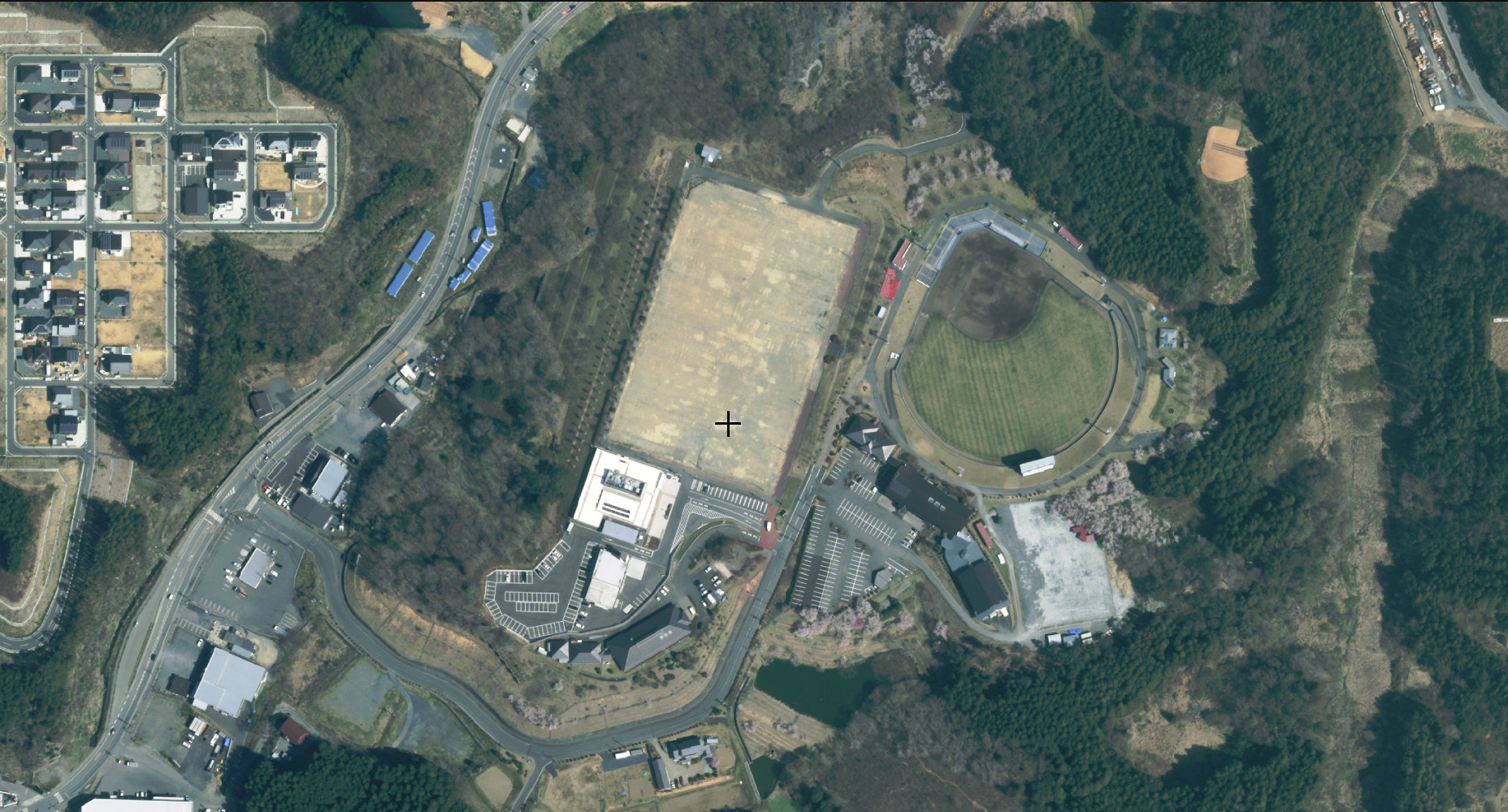
Forest of Heisei

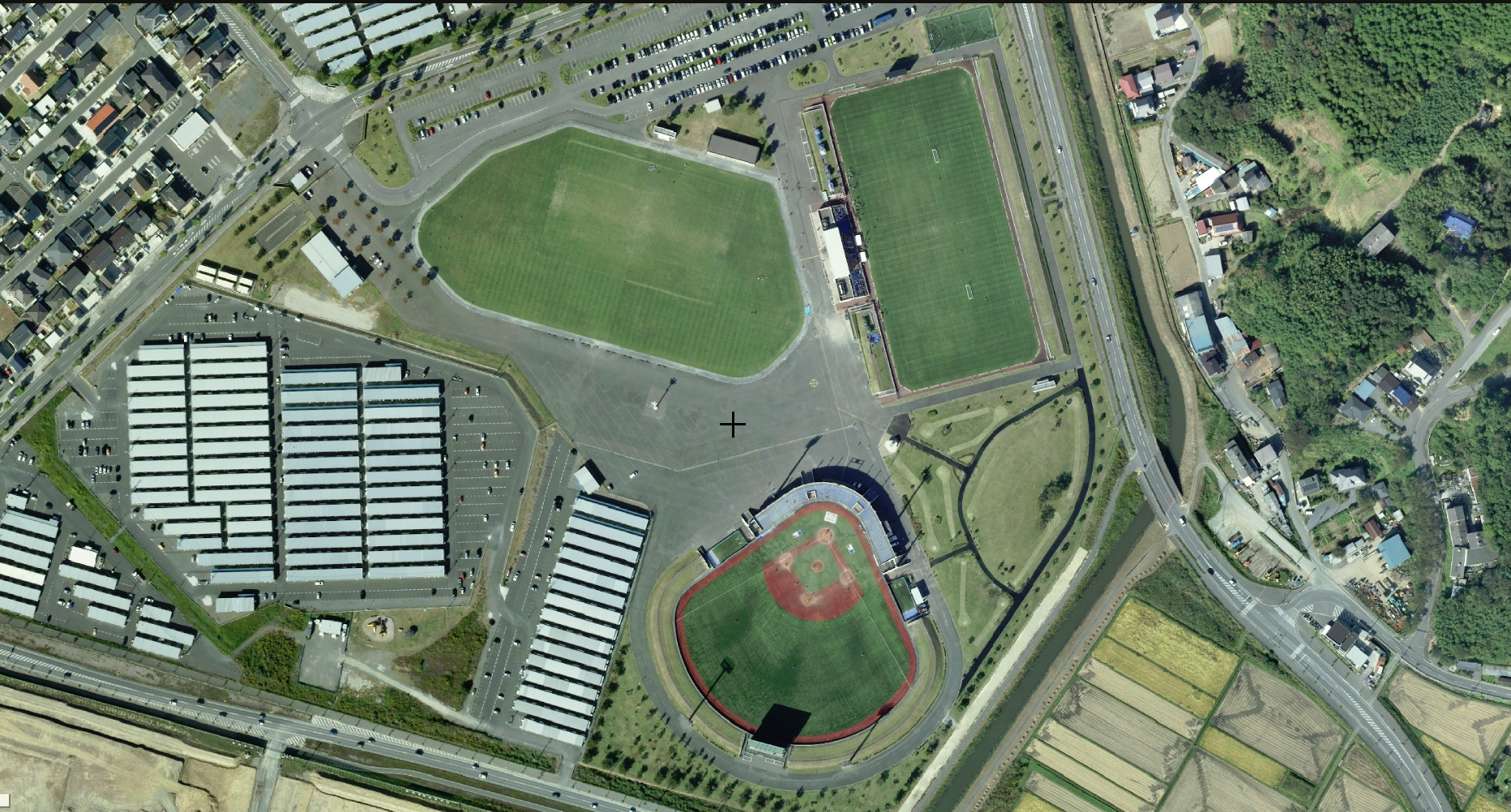
Seihoku Park Ishinomaki

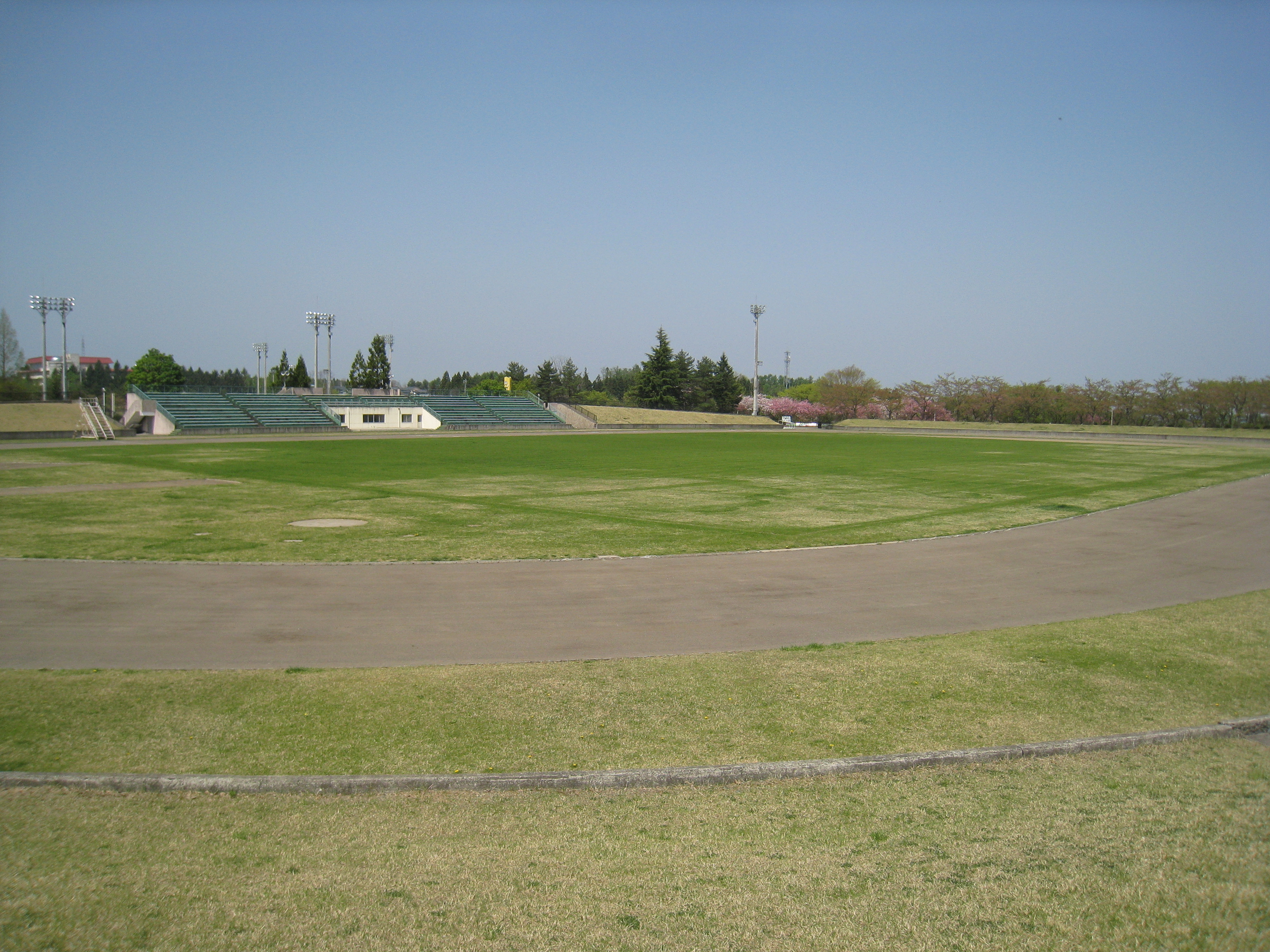
Gonohe Hibarino Park
