= Chūgoku Soccer League =

- First season: 1973; 53 years ago
- Country: Japan (Chūgoku region)
- Confederation: AFC
- Divisions: 1
- Number of clubs: 10
- Level on pyramid: 5
- Promotion to: Japan Football League
- Relegation to: Prefectural Leagues
- Domestic cup: Emperor's Cup
- League cup: All Japan Senior Football Championship
- Current champions: Fukuyama City (2024)
- Most championships: Matsuda SC (9 times)
- Website: csl-jp.net
- Current: 2026 Japanese Regional Leagues

Chūgoku Soccer League (中国サッカーリーグ, Chūgoku Sakkā Rīgu) is the Japanese fifth tier of league football, which is part of the Japanese Regional Leagues. It covers the five prefectures of the Chūgoku region; Tottori, Shimane, Okayama, Hiroshima and Yamaguchi. It is one of the nine Japanese Regional Leagues, the fifth league level in the Japanese association football league system.

== History ==
The league formed in 1973 with six teams from the Chūgoku region: Mazda Auto Hiroshima SC, Hiroshima Teachers, Mitsui Shipbuilding Soccer Club, Mitsubishi Oil, Mitsui Oil and Hitachi Works Kasado SC. The format was in a round-robin tournament with teams playing each other twice; once at home and once away. Winning teams earned two points, one point was given to each team in a draw, and losing teams earned no points. League position was determined by the number of points.

The following season, the number of teams increased to eight and generally stayed at that number for some time. However the Mitsui Oil team withdrew from the competition in 1975 because of an oil spill accident at their parent company, leaving the league with seven teams briefly. In the late 1980s, Kawasaki Seitetsu Mizushima SC and Mazda Auto Hiroshima SC achieved promotion to the then Japan Soccer League. Although Kawasaki Seitetsu Mizushima SC were able to avoid relegation back to the Chūgoku League, Mazda Auto Hiroshima SC were relegated the season following promotion twice.

In 1991 the league format changed, awarding three points for a league win, rather than just two.

From 1997 a penalty kick system was introduced so matches could be firmly decided instead of having a draw. If at the end of 90 minutes the game ends in a draw, a penalty shoot out is held. The winning team is awarded two points (instead of three) and the losing team is awarded one point (instead of zero).

In the 2000s, SC Tottori, Mitsubishi Motors Mizushima F.C. and Fagiano Okayama achieve promotion to the JFL.

From 2007 the penalty kick system ended, and standard regulation matches commenced. Teams played each other at home and away (each team would actually play 18 matches), and an appropriate method was decided in order to determine league placements should teams have the same number of points (highest goal difference, most goals for, the results of the respective teams matches). Based on those results, the top four teams would be split from the next four teams (5th to 8th). Teams would play in these smaller groups against each other once, meaning the final league result is based on 21 matches. Furthermore, this means that teams finishing 9th or 10th will not be able to have the chance at promotion after the initial 18 matches, should they situation arise.

Since 2008, the league has consisted of ten teams. In 2009, the two block split was abolished, and a traditional home and away league structure was introduced.

== Regulations ==
Just like the JFL, matches last for two 45 minute halves with no extra time. Winning teams receive 3 points, drawing teams receive one point, and losing teams receive no points.

League winners earn the right to represent the Chūgoku region at the Regional League promotion series, with the aim of promotion to the JFL. Depending on the year, two or more teams may also be invited.

== 2026 clubs ==
=== Division 1 ===
#	Club Team	Hometown	Notes
1	SRC Hiroshima	Hiroshima, Hiroshima	
2	Baleine Shimonoseki	Shimonoseki, Yamaguchi	
3	Belugarosso Iwami	Hamada, Shimane	
4	ENEOS Mizushima (ja)	Kurashiki, Okayama	Won play-off match and stay in division
5	Fukuyama City	Fukuyama City, Hiroshima	
6	International Pacific Univ. FC	Higashi-ku, Okayama City, Okayama	
7	Mitsubishi Motors Mizushima	Kurashiki, Okayama	
8	Miyajima United FC (ja)	Hatsukaichi, Hiroshima	Name changed from "Hatsukaichi FC"
9	Valimore Aki	Hiroshima	Promoted (1st place in the final tournament of the Chugoku Regional Provincial League)
10	Yonago Genki SC (ja)	Yonago, Tottori	

=== Former clubs ===
Tottori Prefecture

- Yonago SC
- SC Tottori (Tottori Teachers)
- Tottori Kickers Football Club
- Genki Soccer Club
- SC Tottori Dreams
- Banmel Tottori (ja)

Shimane Prefecture

- Dezzolla Shimane
- Masuda Club
- Iwami F.C.
- SC Matsue

Okayama Prefecture

- Fagiano Okayama Next
- Mitsui Shipbuilding Soccer Club
- Mitsui Oil
- Kawasaki Seitetsu Mizushima SC
- Okayama Teachers FC
- Fagiano Okayama
- JX Nippon Oil & Energy Mizushima F.C.

Yamaguchi Prefecture

- FC Ube Yahhh-Man
- Tanabe Mitsubishi
- Renofa Yamaguchi F.C.
- Hitachi Works Kasado SC

Hiroshima Prefecture

- Hiroshima City Hall
- Yamakou FC
- Nisshin Steel Kure
- Hiroshima FC
- Ẽfini Hiroshima S.C. (Mazda Auto Hiroshima SC)
- Fujifilm BIJ Hiroshima
- Hiroshima Fujita SC
- Matsuda SC
- Sanfrecce Hiroshima (Youth team)
- MTO Fukuyama FC (JFE Steel West Japan)

== Promotion and relegation ==
=== Promotion from the Chūgoku Soccer League ===
Basically, for the league champions to be promoted to a higher league, it is necessary to compete in a specified national tournament. Up until and including the 1976 season, the All Japan Senior Football Championship was used in which the winner and runner-up played off in a promotion and relegation series against the bottom two clubs of the JSL. However, from 1977 the Regional League promotion series became the tournament of choice. The following teams have achieved promotion from the Chūgoku Soccer League.

- JSL 2 (1973 - 1991)
  - 1985：Kawasaki Seitetsu Mizushima SC
  - 1986：Mazda Auto Hiroshima SC (Relegated in 1987)
  - 1988：Mazda Auto Hiroshima SC (Relegated in 1989)
- JFL (1999–Present)
  - 2000：SC Tottori
  - 2004：Mitsubishi Motors Mizushima F.C.
  - 2007：Fagiano Okayama
  - 2013 : Fagiano Okayama Next, Renofa Yamaguchi F.C.

=== Promotion from Prefectural Leagues ===
The top two teams from each of the five prefectural leagues in the Chūgoku region meet in a promotional tournament. Teams are split into two blocks, with the block winners being promoted to the Chūgoku Soccer League. However, owing to which teams are promoted to and relegated from the JFL, there is a possibility that the number of promotions from the Prefectural leagues will change.

=== Relegation to the Prefectural Leagues ===
The two teams positioned 9th and 10th at the end of the season are relegated to their local Prefectural League.

== Final league positions ==
Teams in blue participated in the National Promotional Tournament, with bold teams achieving promotion.

=== 1973 to 1987 ===
	Year	Teams	1	2	3	4	5	6	7	8	Notes	
1	1973	6	Mazda Auto Hiroshima SC	Hiroshima Teachers	Mitsui Shipbuilding S.C.	Mitsubishi Oil Mizushima	Mitsui Oil	Hitachi Works Kasado SC	-		6 teams	1
2	1974	8	Hiroshima Fujita SC	Mitsui Shipbuilding S.C.	Hiroshima Teachers	Mazda Auto Hiroshima SC	Mitsubishi Oil Mizushima	Nihon Seikoukure	Hitachi Works Kasado SC	Mitsui Oil	Increase to 8 teams	2
3	1975	7	Hiroshima Fujita SC	Mitsui Shipbuilding S.C.	Hiroshima Teachers	Nihon Seikoukure	Hitachi Works Kasado SC	Mazda Auto Hiroshima SC	Masuda Club	-	Mitsui Oil withdraws	3
4	1976	8	Hiroshima Fujita SC	Mitsui Shipbuilding S.C.	Mitsubishi Oil Mizushima	Mazda Auto Hiroshima SC	Masuda Club	Hiroshima Teachers	Nihon Seikoukure	Hitachi Works Kasado SC		4
5	1977	8	Mitsui Shipbuilding S.C.	Mazda Auto Hiroshima SC	Mitsubishi Oil Mizushima	Hiroshima Fujita SC	Masuda Club	Tanabe Mitsubishi	Nihon Seikoukure	Hiroshima Teachers		5
6	1978	8	Mazda Auto Hiroshima SC	Mitsui Shipbuilding S.C.	Tanabe Mitsubishi	Mitsubishi Oil Mizushima	Kawasaki Seitetsu Mizushima SC	Hitachi Works Kasado SC	Hiroshima Fujita SC	Masuda Club		6
7	1979	8	Mazda Auto Hiroshima SC	Mitsubishi Oil Mizushima	Kawasaki Seitetsu Mizushima SC	Mitsui Shipbuilding S.C.	Tanabe Mitsubishi	Mitsubishi Motors Mizushima F.C.	Hitachi Works Kasado SC	Matsue City Football Club		7
8	1980	8	Kawasaki Seitetsu Mizushima SC	Masuda Club	Tanabe Mitsubishi	Mitsui Shipbuilding S.C.	Mazda Auto Hiroshima SC	Yamaguchi Teachers	Mitsubishi Motors Mizushima F.C.	Mitsubishi Oil Mizushima		8
9	1981	8	Kawasaki Seitetsu Mizushima SC	Mitsubishi Oil Mizushima	Mazda Auto Hiroshima SC	Masuda Club	Mitsui Shipbuilding S.C.	Tanabe Mitsubishi	Yamaguchi Teachers	Mitsubishi Motors Mizushima F.C.		8
10	1982	8	Kawasaki Seitetsu Mizushima SC	Yamaguchi Teachers	Mitsubishi Oil Mizushima	Mazda Auto Hiroshima SC	Tanabe Mitsubishi	Hitachi Works Kasado SC	Masuda Club	Mitsui Shipbuilding S.C.		10
11	1983	8	Mazda Auto Hiroshima SC	Yamaguchi Teachers	Kawasaki Seitetsu Mizushima SC	Tanabe Mitsubishi	Mitsubishi Oil Mizushima	Mitsui Shipbuilding S.C.	Hitachi Works Kasado SC	Masuda Club		11
12	1984	8	Kawasaki Seitetsu Mizushima SC	Mazda Auto Hiroshima SC	Mitsubishi Oil Mizushima	Yamaguchi Teachers	Tanabe Mitsubishi	Mitsui Shipbuilding S.C.	Matsuda SC	Masuda Club		12
13	1985	8	Kawasaki Seitetsu Mizushima SC	Hiroshima Teachers	Matsuda SC	Mazda Auto Hiroshima SC	Yamaguchi Teachers	Tanabe Mitsubishi	Mitsui Shipbuilding S.C.	Mitsubishi Oil Mizushima		13
14	1986	8	Mazda Auto Hiroshima SC	Hiroshima Teachers	Yamaguchi Teachers	Matsuda SC	Mitsubishi Oil Mizushima	Yonago FC	Mitsui Shipbuilding S.C.	Tanabe Mitsubishi		14
15	1987	7	Matsuda SC	Hiroshima Teachers	Yamaguchi Teachers	Yonago FC	Mitsubishi Oil Mizushima	Tottori Teachers	Tanabe Mitsubishi	-		15

=== 1988 to 2002 ===
	Year	Teams	1	2	3	4	5	6	7	8	9	Notes	
16	1988	9	Mazda Auto Hiroshima SC	Matsuda SC	Yamaguchi Teachers	Hiroshima Fujita SC	Hiroshima Teachers	Yonago FC	Tottori Teachers	Mitsubishi Oil Mizushima	Hiroshima City Hall		16
17	1989	7	Matsuda SC	Yamaguchi Teachers	Hiroshima Fujita SC	Okayama Teachers FC	Hiroshima Teachers	Mitsubishi Oil Mizushima	Yonago FC	-			17
18	1990	9	Matsuda SC	Mazda Auto Hiroshima SC	Mitsubishi Motors Mizushima F.C.	Yamaguchi Teachers	Hiroshima Teachers	Hiroshima Fujita SC	Okayama Teachers FC	Mitsubishi Oil Mizushima	Yonago FC		18
19	1991	8	Matsuda SC	NTN Okayama S.C.	Mitsubishi Motors Mizushima F.C.	Yamaguchi Teachers	Ẽfini Hiroshima S.C.	Hiroshima Teachers	Hiroshima Fujita SC	SC Tottori	-	3 point win system introduced	19
20	1992	8	Mitsubishi Motors Mizushima F.C.	Ẽfini Hiroshima S.C.	Matsuda SC	Hiroshima Fujita SC	SC Tottori	Yamaguchi Teachers	Hiroshima Teachers	NTN Okayama S.C.	-		20
21	1993	8	Matsuda SC	Mitsubishi Motors Mizushima F.C.	Yamaguchi Teachers	Hiroshima Fujita SC	Ẽfini Hiroshima S.C.	NTN Okayama S.C.	SC Tottori	Masuda Club	-		21
22	1994	8	Matsuda SC	Mitsubishi Motors Mizushima F.C.	NTN Okayama S.C.	Ẽfini Hiroshima S.C.	Hiroshima Fujita SC	Yamaguchi Teachers	SC Tottori	Masuda Club	-		22
23	1995	8	Hiroshima Fujita SC	Mitsubishi Motors Mizushima F.C.	Matsuda SC	Yamakou FC	Mitsubishi Oil Mizushima	Ẽfini Hiroshima S.C.	NTN Okayama S.C.	Yamaguchi Teachers	-		23
24	1996	8	Matsuda SC	Hiroshima Fujita SC	Mitsubishi Motors Mizushima F.C.	Hiroshima Teachers	Mitsubishi Oil Mizushima	Yamaguchi Teachers	Ẽfini Hiroshima S.C.	Yamakou FC	-		24
25	1997	8	Matsuda SC	Mitsubishi Oil Mizushima	Hiroshima Fujita SC	Mitsubishi Motors Mizushima F.C.	Yamakou FC	Hiroshima Teachers	NKK Fukuyama	Yamaguchi Teachers	-	Penalty kick system introduced	25
26	1998	8	Matsuda SC	Hiroshima Fujita SC	Mitsubishi Motors Mizushima F.C.	Hiroshima Teachers	Mitsubishi Oil Mizushima	NKK Fukuyama	Yamakou FC	SC Tottori	-		26
27	1999	8	Mitsubishi Motors Mizushima F.C.	Hiroshima Fujita SC	Matsuda SC	Hiroshima Teachers	Nisseki Mitsubishi Mizushima	SC Tottori	NKK Fukuyama	Yamakou FC	-		27
28	2000	8	SC Tottori	Mitsubishi Motors Mizushima F.C.	Hiroshima Teachers	Hiroshima Fujita SC	Yamaguchi Teachers	Nisshin Steel Kure	Matsuda SC	Nisseki Mitsubishi Mizushima	-		28
29	2001	7	Hiroshima FC	Mitsubishi Motors Mizushima F.C.	Hiroshima Fujita SC	Hiroshima Teachers	Matsuda SC	Nisshin Steel Kure	Yamaguchi Teachers	-			29
30	2002	8	Mitsubishi Motors Mizushima F.C.	Hiroshima Fujita SC	Hiroshima FC	Yamaguchi Teachers	Iwami FC	Matsuda SC	Hiroshima Teachers	Nisshin Steel Kure	-		30

=== 2003 to 2017 ===
	Year	Teams	1	2	3	4	5	6	7	8	9	10	Notes	
31	2003	8	Mitsubishi Motors Mizushima F.C.	Tottori Kickers	Iwami FC	Hiroshima Fujita SC	JFE Steel West Japan	Hiroshima FC	Matsuda SC	Yamaguchi Teachers	-			31
32	2004	8	Mitsubishi Motors Mizushima F.C.	Hiroshima Fujita SC	Sagawa Express Chugoku S.C.	Hitachi Works Kasado SC	Iwami FC	JFE Steel West Japan	Tottori Kickers	Hiroshima FC	-			32
33	2005	7	Sagawa Express Chugoku S.C.	Fagiano Okayama	Hiroshima Fujita SC	Hitachi Works Kasado SC	Iwami FC	JFE Steel West Japan	Yamaguchi Teachers	-				33
34	2006	8	Fagiano Okayama	Central Chūgoku	Sagawa Express Chugoku S.C.	Renofa Yamaguchi F.C.	Hiroshima Fujita SC	JFE Steel West Japan	Hitachi Works Kasado SC	Iwami FC	-			34
35	2007	8	Fagiano Okayama	Central Chūgoku	Renofa Yamaguchi F.C.	Sagawa Express Chugoku S.C.	Hiroshima Fujita SC	Matsuda SC	JFE Steel West Japan	Hitachi Works Kasado SC	-		2 block league split introduced	35
36	2008	9	Renofa Yamaguchi F.C.	Sagawa Express Chugoku S.C.	NTN Okayama S.C.	FC Ube Yahhh-Man	Dezzolla Shimane	Hitachi Works Kasado SC	Matsuda SC	JFE Steel West Japan	Hiroshima Fujita SC	-	10 team structure introduced	36
37	2009	10	Sagawa Express Chugoku S.C.	Renofa Yamaguchi F.C.	NTN Okayama S.C.	FC Ube Yahhh-Man	JX Mizushima	Dezzolla Shimane	Hitachi Works Kasado SC	JFE Steel West Japan	Matsuda SC	Genki S.C.	2 block league split abolished	37
38	2010	10	Renofa Yamaguchi F.C.	Dezzolla Shimane	Volador Matsue	Fagiano Okayama Next	NTN Okayama S.C.	Sagawa Express Chugoku S.C.	JX Mizushima	FC Ube Yahhh-Man	Hitachi Works Kasado SC	JFE Steel West Japan		38
39	2011	10	Dezzolla Shimane	Renofa Yamaguchi F.C.	Fagiano Okayama Next	Mitsubishi Motors Mizushima F.C.	Fuji Xerox Hiroshima S.C.	NTN Okayama S.C.	Matsue City Football Club	JX Nippon Oil & Energy Mizushima F.C.	Sagawa Express Chugoku S.C.	FC Ube Yahhh-Man		39
40	2012	10	Dezzolla Shimane	Fagiano Okayama Next	Matsue City Football Club	Renofa Yamaguchi F.C.	Mitsubishi Motors Mizushima F.C.	Fuji Xerox Hiroshima S.C.	JX Nippon Oil & Energy Mizushima F.C.	NTN Okayama S.C.	Hitachi Works Kasado SC	SC Tottori Dreams		40
41	2013	10	Fagiano Okayama Next	Dezzolla Shimane	Renofa Yamaguchi F.C.	Matsue City Football Club	NTN Okayama S.C.	Fuji Xerox Hiroshima S.C.	Mitsubishi Motors Mizushima F.C.	Sagawa Express Chugoku S.C.	SRC Hiroshima	JX Nippon Oil & Energy Mizushima F.C.		41
42	2014	10	Matsue City Football Club	Dezzolla Shimane	Mitsubishi Motors Mizushima F.C.	SRC Hiroshima	JX Nippon Oil & Energy Mizushima F.C.	Fuji Xerox Hiroshima S.C.	NTN Okayama S.C.	Sagawa Express Chugoku S.C.	FC Ube Yahhh-Man	Hitachi Works Kasado SC		42
43	2015	10	Matsue City Football Club	Dezzolla Shimane	Mitsubishi Motors Mizushima F.C.	SRC Hiroshima	International Pacific University	NTN Okayama S.C.	Fuji Xerox Hiroshima S.C.	JX Nippon Oil & Energy Mizushima F.C.	Sagawa Express Chugoku S.C.	SC Matsue		43
44	2016	10	SRC Hiroshima	Matsue City FC	Mitsubishi Motors Mizushima FC	IPU FC	JX Nippon Oil & Energy Mizushima FC	Dezzolla Shimane	HATSUKAICHI FC	NTN Okayama	Fuji Xerox Hiroshima S.C.	SC Tottori Dreams		44
45	2017	10	Mitsubishi Motors Mizushima FC	Matsue City FC	SRC Hiroshima	Dezzolla Shimane	HATSUKAICHI FC	NTN Okayama	IPU FC	JXTG Mizushima FC	Panasonic Okayama SC	Yonago Genki SC		45

=== 2018 onwards ===
	Year	Teams	1	2	3	4	5	6	7	8	9	10	Notes	
46	2018	10	Matsue City	Mitsubishi Mizushima FC	SRC Hiroshima	International Pacific University SC	JXTG Energy Mizushima	Harada Kogyo FC	Fuji Xerox Hiroshima SC	Hatsukaichi FC	NTN Okayama	Dezzolla Shimane		46
47	2019	10	SRC Hiroshima	Mitsubishi Mizushima	IPU FC	Baleine Shimonoseki	JXTG Energy Mizushima	Fuji Xerox Hiroshima	NTN Okayama	Hamada FC Cosmos	Harada Kogyo	Hatsukaichi FC		47
48	2020	8	Baleine Shimonoseki	SRC Hiroshima	Energy Mizushima	Yonago Genki (w)	Mitsubishi Mizushima	Fuji Xerox Hiroshima	Bergarosso Hamada	IPU FC			NTN Okayama and Dezzolla Shimane did not participate in this season, Yonago Genki withdrew	48
49	2021	9	Mitsubishi Mizushima	Baleine Shimonoseki	IPU FC	Bergarosso Hamada	NTN Okayama	SRC Hiroshima	Yonago Genki	Fujifilm BIJ Hiroshima	ENEOS Mizushima			49
50	2022	10	Fukuyama City	Baleine Shimonoseki	Belugarosso Hamada	SRC Hiroshima	Mitsubishi Motors Mizushima	IPU FC	NTN Okayama	Yonago Genki	FUJIFILM BIJ Hiroshima	SC Matsue		50
51	2023	10	Fukuyama City	SRC Hiroshima	Baleine Shimonoseki	Belugarosso Iwami	Mitsubishi Mizushima	Yonago Genki	International Pacific University FC	Hatsukaichi FC	NTN Okayama	Vajra Okayama		51
52	2024	10	Fukuyama City	SRC Hiroshima	Belugarosso Iwami	Baleine Shimonoseki	Mitsubishi Mizushima	International Pacific Univ. FC	Hatsukaichi FC	Yonago Genki	Banmel Tottori	NTN Okayama		52
53	2025	10	Fukuyama City	Belugarosso Iwami	International Pacific Univ. FC	Yonago Genki SC	Hatsukaichi FC	Baleine Shimonoseki	SRC Hiroshima	Mitsubishi Mizushima	ENEOS Mizushima	Banmel Tottori		53
54	2026-27	10												54

== See also ==
- Japanese association football league system
- Japanese Regional Leagues
