= Kantō Soccer League =

Japanese football league

- Founded: 1967; 59 years ago
- Country: Japan
- Confederation: AFC
- Divisions: 2
- Number of clubs: Div 1: 10; Div 2: 10
- Level on pyramid: 5–6
- Promotion to: Japan Football League
- Relegation to: Prefectural Leagues
- Domestic cup: Emperor's Cup
- Current champions: Tokyo United (2025)
- Most championships: Vonds Ichihara (9)
- Website: www.kanto-sl.jp
- Current: 2026 Japanese Regional Leagues

Kantō Soccer League (関東サッカーリーグ, Kantō Sakkā Rīgu), abbreviated as KSL, is the Japanese fifth tier of league football, which is part of the Japanese Regional Leagues. It covers most of the Kantō region, as well as the prefectures of Chiba, Gunma, Ibaraki, Kanagawa, Saitama, Tochigi, Tokyo and Yamanashi. Its area is thus coextensive with the National Capital Region.

== History ==
It was founded in 1967 as the Kanto Adult Soccer League and was renamed to its current name in 2000. In 2003 the KSL moved to a two-tier system and since 2012 both the first and second divisions were expanded to ten clubs. It is one of the nine regional leagues in Japan. The first division corresponds to the fifth tier and the second division corresponds to the sixth tier of Japanese football pyramid.

== 2026 clubs ==
=== Division 1 ===
Team	Hometown	Position (in Prev season)	Notes
Aries Toshima FC (ja)	Toshima, Tokyo	8th	
Edo All United (ja)	Edogawa, Tokyo	1st (2nd division)	Promoted from Division 2 as champions.
Nankatsu SC	Katsushika, Tokyo	2nd	
Nihon University FC (ja)	Inagi, Tokyo	5th	
RKD Ryugasaki	Ryūgasaki, Ibaraki	9th	Remained in Division 1 due to Vonds Ichihara who finished in 4th place and secured promotion to JFL after winning promotion relegation play-off against Atletico Suzuka.
Shibuya City (ja)	Shibuya, Tokyo	2nd (2nd division)	Promoted from Division 2 as runners-up.
Toho Titanium SC	Chigasaki, Kanagawa	3rd	
Toin University of Yokohama (ja)	Yokohama, Kanagawa	7th	
Tokyo 23	Special wards of Tokyo	6th	
Tokyo United	Bunkyō, Tokyo	Champions	

=== Division 2 ===
Team	Hometown	Position (in Prev season)	Notes
Atsugi Hayabusa (ja)	Atsugi, Kanagawa	9th	Remained in Division 2 due to Vonds Ichihara who finished in 4th place and secured promotion to JFL after winning promotion relegation play-off against Atletico Suzuka.
Coedo Kawagoe FC (ja)	Kawagoe, Saitama	6th	
Esperanza SC (ja)	Yokohama, Kanagawa	5th	
Hitachi Building System SC (ja)	Chiyoda, Tokyo	4th	
Joyful Honda Tsukuba	Tsukuba, Ibaraki	10th	Relegated from Division 1
Onodera FC (ja)	Yokohama, Kanagawa	1st (Kanto Amateur Soccer)	Promoted as champions in the Kanto Amateur Soccer Tournament.
Tokyo International University FC (ja)	Sakado, Saitama	8th	
Tonan Maebashi	Maebashi, Gunma	3rd	
Vertfee Yaita	Yaita, Tochigi	7th	
Tochigi City U-25	Tochigi, Tochigi	2nd (Kanto Amateur Soccer)	Promoted as runners-up in the Kanto Amateur Soccer Tournament. Reserve team from Tochigi City FC

== Kantō Soccer League Champions ==
Division 1
Edition	Year	Winner
1	1967	Urawa Club (1)
2	1968	Fujitsu (1)
3	1969	Kofu Club (1)
4	1970	Kofu Club (2)
5	1971	Towa Real Estate (1)
6	1972	Urawa Club (2)
7	1973	Furukawa Chiba (1)
8	1974	Kodama Club (1)
9	1975	Hitachi Mito (1)
10	1976	Nissan Motors (1)
11	1977	Toshiba Horikawacho (1)
12	1978	Toho Titanium (1)
13	1979	Saitama Teachers (1)
14	1980	Saitama Teachers (2)
15	1981	Furukawa Chiba (2)
16	1982	Toho Titanium (2)
17	1983	Yokohama TriStar (1)
18	1984	Toho Titanium (3)
19	1985	Toho Titanium (4)
20	1986	Saitama Teachers (3)
20	1987	Saitama Teachers (4)
22	1988	Yomiuri Juniors (1)
23	1989	Yomiuri Juniors (2)
24	1990	Tokyo Gas (1)
25	1991	Nissan Motors Farm (1)
26	1992	Honda Motors Sayama (1)
27	1993	Honda Motors Sayama (2)
28	1994	Furukawa Electric (3)
29	1995	Prima Ham Tsuchiura (1)
30	1996	Luminoso Sayama (3)
31	1997	Furukawa Electric (4)
32	1998	Furukawa Electric (5)
33	1999	Tochigi SC (1)
34	2000	Sagawa Express Tokyo (1)
35	2001	Luminoso Sayama (4)
36	2002	Ome FC (1)
37	2003	Gunma Horikoshi (1)
38	2004	Luminoso Sayama (5)
39	2005	Luminoso Sayama (6)
40	2006	Yokohama SCC (1)
41	2007	Machida Zelvia (1)
42	2008	Machida Zelvia (2)
43	2009	Yokohama SCC (2)
44	2010	Yokohama SCC (3)
45	2011	Yokohama SCC (4)
46	2012	SC Sagamihara (1)
47	2013	FC Korea (1)
48	2014	Urayasu SC (1)
49	2015	Briobecca Urayasu (2)
50	2016	Tokyo 23 FC
51	2017	Vonds Ichihara (6)
52	2018	Tochigi Uva (1)
53	2019	Vonds Ichihara (7)
54	2020	Tochigi City (2)
55	2021	Criacao Shinjuku (1)
56	2022	Tochigi City (3)
57	2023	Vonds Ichihara (8)
58	2024	Vonds Ichihara (9)
59	2025	Tokyo United (1)
60	2026	

Division 2
Edition	Year	Winner
1	2003	Thespa Kusatsu (1)
2	2004	JEF United Ichihara Amateur (1)
3	2005	Hanno Bruder (1)
4	2006	Machida Zelvia ()1
5	2007	Club Dragons (1)
6	2008	Hanno Bruder (2)
7	2009	Verfe Takahara Nasu (1)
8	2010	Toho Titanium (1)
9	2011	SC Sagamihara (1)
10	2012	Tokyo 23 F.C. (1)
11	2013	Urayasu FC (1)
12	2014	Tsukuba FC (1)
13	2015	Yokohama Takeru (1)
14	2016	Tokyo United FC (1)
15	2017	Tokyo International University FC (1)
16	2018	Toin University of Yokohama (1)
17	2019	Criacao Shinjuku (1)
18	2020	Toin Yokohama University FC (2)
19	2021	Toho Titanium (2)
20	2022	Toin Yokohama University FC (3)
21	2023	Aries Tokyo FC (1)
22	2024	RKD Ryugasaki (2)
23	2025	Edo All United (ja) (1)
24	2026	
