= 1985 Japanese Regional Leagues =

Japanese amateur leagues football season

Japanese Regional Leagues
- Season: 1985

Statistics of Japanese Regional Leagues for the 1985 season.

== Champions list ==
Region	Champions
Hokkaido	Sapporo
Tohoku	Akita City Government
Kantō	Toho Titanium
Hokushin'etsu	Yamaga
Tōkai	Cosmo Daikyo Oil
Kansai	NTT Kansai
Chūgoku	Kawasaki Steel Mizushima
Shikoku	Teijin
Kyushu	Nippon Steel Oita

== League standings ==
=== Hokkaido ===
Pos	Team	Pld	W	D	L	GF	GA	GD	Pts	Qualification or relegation
1	Sapporo (Q)	9	8	1	0	19	4	+15	17	Qualification for the 1985 Regional Finals
2	Sapporo University OB	9	5	3	1	32	21	+11	13	
3	Sapporo Mazda	9	5	1	3	27	13	+14	11	
4	Blackpecker Hakodate	9	3	3	3	16	13	+3	9	
5	Otaru Shuyukai	9	4	1	4	20	23	−3	9	
6	Nippon Steel Muroran	9	3	3	3	13	16	−3	9	
7	Hakodate Mazda	9	3	2	4	12	15	−3	8	
8	Japan Steel Muroran	9	3	0	6	16	22	−6	6	
9	Hokushukai (O)	9	2	2	5	10	21	−11	6	Participated in the playoff match (vs 2nd place in the Zendo District Finals) therefore remaining in this division
10	Muroran Teachers (R)	9	0	2	7	7	24	−17	2	Relegated to Muroran District League

Source: rsssf.org
Rules for classification: 1) Points; 2) Goal difference; 3) Goals scored
(O) Play-off winners; (Q) Qualified for the phase indicated; (R) Relegated

=== Tohoku ===
Pos	Team	Pld	W	D	L	GF	GA	GD	Pts
1	Akita City Government	12	12	0	0	63	12	+51	24
2	Matsushima	12	7	3	2	34	14	+20	17
3	Morioka Zebra	12	4	5	3	22	21	+1	13
4	Ishinomaki City Government	12	5	0	7	24	28	−4	10
5	Kureha	12	3	4	5	15	32	−17	10
6	Akisho Club	12	3	1	8	12	40	−28	7
7	Nitto Boseki Fukushima	12	1	1	10	18	35	−17	3

Source: RSSSF

=== Kantō ===
Pos	Team	Pld	W	D	L	GF	GA	GD	Pts
1	Toho Titanium	18	13	3	2	37	10	+27	29
2	Saitama Teachers	18	14	1	3	46	21	+25	29
3	Ibaraki Hitachi	18	8	5	5	27	20	+7	21
4	NTT Kanto	18	7	5	6	29	24	+5	19
5	Ibaraki Teachers	18	8	3	7	31	30	+1	19
6	Furukawa Chiba	18	6	5	7	42	31	+11	17
7	Chiba Teachers	18	7	3	8	27	27	0	17
8	Tochigi Teachers	18	5	2	11	20	28	−8	12
9	Hitachi Mito Katsuta	18	3	3	12	14	38	−24	9
10	Yokogawa Hokushin	18	2	4	12	20	64	−44	8

Source: RSSSF

=== Hokushin'etsu ===
Pos	Team	Pld	W	D	L	GF	GA	GD	Pts
1	Yamaga	9	7	1	1	23	7	+16	15
2	Nissei Plastic Industrial	9	7	1	1	21	7	+14	15
3	YKK	9	5	3	1	28	7	+21	13
4	Fukui Teachers	9	4	3	2	17	10	+7	11
5	Toyama Club	9	4	2	3	19	14	+5	10
6	Teihens	9	3	1	5	19	26	−7	7
7	Seiyū Club	9	2	2	5	9	18	−9	6
8	Fujitsu Nagano	9	3	0	6	14	23	−9	6
9	Fukui Bank	9	2	1	6	8	29	−21	5
10	Minamiminowa	9	0	2	7	6	23	−17	2

Source: RSSSF

=== Tōkai ===
Pos	Team	Pld	W	D	L	GF	GA	GD	Pts
1	Cosmo Daikyo Oil	16	10	4	2	39	14	+25	24
2	Jatco	16	10	3	3	39	21	+18	23
3	Fujieda City Government	16	9	4	3	36	16	+20	22
4	Yamaha Club	16	5	5	6	21	25	−4	15
5	Maruyasu	16	6	3	7	26	31	−5	15
6	Tomoegawa Papers	16	4	2	10	17	31	−14	10
7	Shizuoka Gas	16	8	2	6	27	29	−2	18
8	Minolta Camera	16	6	3	7	28	29	−1	15
9	Nagoya	16	5	4	7	22	26	−4	14
10	Toyoda Machine Works	16	6	2	8	25	40	−15	14
11	Mitsui Du Pont Fluorochemicals	16	5	3	8	18	27	−9	13
12	Honda Hamayukai	16	3	3	10	21	30	−9	9

Source: RSSSF

=== Kansai ===
Pos	Team	Pld	W	D	L	GF	GA	GD	Pts
1	NTT Kansai	16	8	4	4	38	20	+18	20
2	Hyogo Teachers	16	8	4	4	25	19	+6	20
3	Osaka Teachers	16	6	7	3	18	16	+2	19
4	Kyoto Shiko Club	16	6	4	6	24	20	+4	16
5	Mitsubishi Motors Kyoto	16	6	4	6	22	21	+1	16
6	Sanyo Electric Sumoto	16	5	6	5	25	26	−1	16
7	Dainichi Nippon Cable	16	6	2	8	14	18	−4	14
8	West Osaka	16	5	4	7	25	34	−9	14
9	Tanabe	16	3	3	10	15	32	−17	9

Source: RSSSF

=== Chūgoku ===
Pos	Team	Pld	W	D	L	GF	GA	GD	Pts
1	Kawasaki Steel Mizushima	14	7	5	2	36	15	+21	19
2	Hiroshima Teachers	14	8	3	3	33	24	+9	19
3	Mazda Toyo	14	7	2	5	33	29	+4	16
4	Mazda Auto Hiroshima	14	5	5	4	23	22	+1	15
5	Yamaguchi Teachers	14	6	1	7	30	29	+1	13
6	Tanabe Pharmaceuticals	14	3	6	5	19	28	−9	12
7	Mitsui Shipbuilding	14	2	6	6	20	31	−11	10
8	Mitsubishi Oil	14	2	4	8	22	38	−16	8

Source: RSSSF

=== Shikoku ===
Pos	Team	Pld	W	D	L	GF	GA	GD	Pts
1	Teijin	14	14	0	0	74	6	+68	28
2	NTT Shikoku	14	9	0	5	59	24	+35	18
3	Imabari Club	14	6	3	5	40	34	+6	15
4	Nangoku Club	14	5	2	7	32	38	−6	12
5	Showa Club	14	6	0	8	21	45	−24	12
6	Takasho OB Club	14	5	1	8	26	48	−22	11
7	Aiyu Club	14	4	1	9	25	52	−27	9
8	Daio Paper	14	3	1	10	25	55	−30	7

Source: RSSSF

=== Kyushu ===
Pos	Team	Pld	W	D	L	GF	GA	GD	Pts
1	Nippon Steel Oita	9	5	3	1	22	14	+8	13
2	Kagoshima Teachers	9	5	2	2	27	18	+9	12
3	Kumamoto Teachers	9	5	2	2	23	15	+8	12
4	Mitsubishi Chemical Kurosaki	9	5	1	3	32	22	+10	11
5	Nakatsu Club	9	5	1	3	27	21	+6	11
6	Kyushu Matsushita Electric	9	4	3	2	11	10	+1	11
7	NTT Kumamoto	9	3	1	5	11	17	−6	7
8	Saga Nanyo Club	9	2	2	5	15	22	−7	6
9	Mitsubishi Heavy Industries Nagasaki	9	1	2	6	6	17	−11	4
10	Fukuoka Teachers	9	1	1	7	11	29	−18	3

Source: RSSSF
