= 1974 Japanese Regional Leagues =

Japanese amateur leagues football season

Japanese Regional Leagues
- Season: 1974

Statistics of Japanese Regional Leagues for the 1974 season.

== Champions list ==
Region	Champions
Kantō	Kodama Club
Tōkai	Honda
Kansai	Yanmar Club
Chūgoku	Hiroshima Fujita
Kyushu	Kagoshima Teachers

== League standings ==
=== Kantō ===
Pos	Team	Pld	W	D	L	GF	GA	GD	Pts
1	Kodama Club	14	8	4	2	30	19	+11	20
2	Hitachi Mito Katsuta	14	6	4	4	22	19	+3	16
3	Saitama Teachers	14	7	1	6	29	27	+2	15
4	NTT Kanto	14	5	5	4	20	28	−8	15
5	Urawa	14	6	2	6	26	23	+3	14
6	Metropolitan Police	14	5	3	6	19	22	−3	13
7	Toho Titanium	14	2	4	8	20	29	−9	8
8	Furukawa Chiba	14	5	1	8	25	24	+1	11

Source: RSSSF

=== Tōkai ===
Pos	Team	Pld	W	D	L	GF	GA	GD	Pts
1	Honda	13	9	3	1	53	11	+42	21
2	Nippon Light Metal	13	7	4	2	33	15	+18	18
3	Nagoya	13	7	4	2	30	17	+13	18
4	Daikyo Oil	13	6	4	3	31	18	+13	16
5	Toyoda Automatic Loom Works	13	4	3	6	21	23	−2	11
6	Sumitomo Bakelite	13	7	2	4	38	23	+15	16
7	Wakaayu Club	13	6	3	4	29	31	−2	15
8	Toyoda Machine Works	13	3	2	8	19	31	−12	8
9	Gifu Teachers	13	2	2	9	24	51	−27	6
10	Iga	13	0	1	12	14	71	−57	1

Source: RSSSF

=== Kansai ===
Pos	Team	Pld	W	D	L	GF	GA	GD	Pts
1	Yanmar Club	14	11	2	1	30	9	+21	24
2	Nippon Steel Hirohata	14	6	3	5	27	20	+7	15
3	Yuasa Batteries	14	6	3	5	24	25	−1	15
4	Mitsubishi Motors Kyoto	14	5	4	5	22	19	+3	14
5	Wakayama Teachers	14	5	3	6	26	23	+3	13
6	Mitsubishi Heavy Industries Kobe	14	4	4	6	18	22	−4	12
7	Kinki Bank	14	4	2	8	23	31	−8	10
8	Omi Club	14	4	1	9	14	35	−21	9

Source: RSSSF

=== Chūgoku ===
This was the 2nd edition of the Chūgoku Football League.

Pos	Team	Pld	W	D	L	GF	GA	GD	Pts
1	Hiroshima Fujita	14	13	0	1	52	9	+43	26
2	Mitsui Shipbuilding	14	10	0	4	44	17	+27	20
3	Hiroshima Teachers	14	6	4	4	29	26	+3	16
4	Mazda Auto Hiroshima	14	7	1	6	34	28	+6	15
5	Mitsubishi Oil	14	6	1	7	25	18	+7	13
6	Japan Steel	14	4	3	7	15	36	−21	11
7	Hitachi Kasado	14	1	4	9	19	53	−34	6
8	Mitsui Oil	14	2	1	11	14	45	−31	5

Source: RSSSF

=== Kyushu ===
This is the 2nd edition of the Kyushu Football League Division.

Pos	Team	Pld	W	D	L	GF	GA	GD	Pts
1	Kagoshima Teachers	7	7	0	0	20	2	+18	14
2	Nakatsu Club	7	3	3	1	21	12	+9	9
3	Nishi-Nippon Railroad	7	3	3	1	12	11	+1	9
4	Kagoshima Club	7	3	1	3	21	14	+7	7
5	Saga Nanyo Club	7	1	4	2	11	14	−3	6
6	Mitsubishi Chemical Kurosaki	7	1	4	2	12	18	−6	6
7	Kumamoto Teachers	7	1	2	4	13	17	−4	4
8	Ōita Sportsman Club	7	0	1	6	4	26	−22	1

Source: RSSSF
