= 1973 Japanese Regional Leagues =

Japanese amateur leagues football season

Japanese Regional Leagues
- Season: 1973

Statistics of Japanese Regional Leagues for the 1973 season.

== Champions list ==
Region	Champions
Kantō	Furukawa Chiba
Tōkai	Honda
Kansai	Sumitomo Metals
Chūgoku	Mazda Auto Hiroshima
Kyushu	Mitsubishi Chemical Kurosaki

== League standings ==
=== Kantō ===
The 7th Kantō Adult Soccer League. (Shōwa 48)

Pos	Team	Pld	W	D	L	GF	GA	GD	Pts	Qualification or relegation
1	Furukawa Chiba (C)	14	8	5	1	43	18	+25	21	
2	Hitachi Mito Katsuta	14	9	2	3	30	19	+11	20	
3	Urawa	14	8	3	3	30	23	+7	19	
4	Kodama Club	14	8	2	4	30	22	+8	18	
5	Toho Titanium	14	4	3	7	24	27	−3	11	
6	Ibaraki Hitachi (Note: Ibaraki Hitachi, who finished second in the All-Japan Adult Soccer Championship, was promoted to the JSL 2nd Division due to the closure of the Eidai Industrial Soccer Club. Saitama Teachers' Club, which won the Kanto Adult Soccer Tournament, was automatically promoted to the Kanto League.) (P)	14	2	6	6	16	24	−8	10	Promoted to JSL 2nd Division
7	Aoyama (Note: The 7th and 8th place teams participated in the replacement match and were relegated to the Tokyo Prefectural League after losing to the runner-up Denden Kanto and the 3rd place Metropolitan Police Department Soccer Club.) (R)	14	3	2	9	18	34	−16	8	Relegated to Tokyo Metropolitan League
8	Yokohama Club (R)	14	1	3	10	11	35	−24	5	Relegated to Kanagawa Prefectural League

Source: RSSSF
(C) Champions; (P) Promoted; (R) Relegated

=== Tōkai ===
Pos	Team	Pld	W	D	L	GF	GA	GD	Pts
1	Honda (C)	14	12	1	1	48	13	+35	25
2	Daikyo Oil	14	7	5	2	39	16	+23	19
3	Nagoya	14	8	2	4	42	20	+22	18
4	Sumitomo Bakelite	14	6	5	3	33	29	+4	17
5	Wakaayu Club	14	5	3	6	25	32	−7	13
6	Gifu Teachers	14	3	3	8	18	45	−27	9
7	Toyoda Machine Works	14	2	3	9	12	28	−16	7
8	Iga	14	1	2	11	21	55	−34	4

Source: RSSSF
(C) Champions
- With the expansion of the number of teams to 10 for the following 1974 season, the 7th and 8th places teams that would normally be relegated, stayed in the division.

=== Kansai ===
Pos	Team	Pld	W	D	L	GF	GA	GD	Pts
1	Sumitomo Metals (Note: The Sumitomo Metal Industries Football Club, the champion of the All-Japan Adult Soccer Championship, was promoted to the second division of the JSL and due to this promotion, the eighth-place team (Mitsubishi Heavy Industries Kobe) in the league would normally be relegated, were not.) (C)	14	9	2	3	37	22	+15	20
2	Yanmar Club	14	8	3	3	22	13	+9	19
3	Nippon Steel Hirohata	14	7	2	5	30	16	+14	16
4	Omi Club	14	7	1	6	25	25	0	15
5	Mitsubishi Motors Kyoto	14	5	4	5	24	27	−3	14
6	Wakayama Teachers	14	6	0	8	24	26	−2	12
7	Yuasa Batteries	14	4	2	8	20	32	−12	10
8	Mitsubishi Heavy Industries Kobe	14	1	4	9	13	34	−21	6

Source: RSSSF
(C) Champions

=== Chūgoku ===
This was the 1st edition of the Chūgoku Football League.

Pos	Team	Pld	W	D	L	GF	GA	GD	Pts
1	Mazda Auto Hiroshima (C)	10	9	0	1	36	8	+28	18
2	Hiroshima Teachers	10	8	0	2	28	15	+13	16
3	Mitsui Shipbuilding	10	6	0	4	23	10	+13	12
4	Mitsubishi Oil	10	4	0	6	12	17	−5	8
5	Mitsui Oil	10	2	1	7	8	32	−24	5
6	Hitachi Kasado	10	0	1	9	5	30	−25	1

Source: RSSSF
(C) Champions

=== Kyushu ===
This is the 1st edition of the Kyushu Football League Division

Pos	Team	Pld	W	D	L	GF	GA	GD	Pts	Qualification or relegation
1	Mitsubishi Chemical Kurosaki (C)	6	4	1	1	18	7	+11	9	
2	Saga Nanyo Club	6	4	0	2	18	11	+7	8	
3	Kagoshima Teachers	6	3	1	2	19	10	+9	7	
4	Nishi-Nippon Railroad	6	3	1	2	14	10	+4	7	
5	Kumamoto Teachers	6	3	1	2	15	13	+2	7	
6	Kagoshima Club	6	1	0	5	11	23	−12	2	
7	Tsuruya Department Store (R)	6	1	0	5	5	26	−21	2	Participation in the play-off match, lost and was relegated to Kumamoto Prefectural League.

Source: RSSSF
Rules for classification: 1) Points; 2) Goal difference; 3) Goals scored
(C) Champions; (R) Relegated

== Promotion/relegation playoff ==
Tsuruya Department Store (Kumamoto) （Kyushu Football League 7th place）	1–2	Oita Sportsman Club (Oita) (Kyushu Football League Promotion Championship runner-up)
