= 1976 Japanese Regional Leagues =

Japanese amateur leagues football season

Japanese Regional Leagues
- Season: 1976

Statistics of Japanese Regional Leagues in the 1976 season.

== Champions list ==
Region	Champions
Kantō	Nissan Motors
Hokushin'etsu	Nissei Plastic Industrial
Tōkai	Nagoya
Kansai	Dainichi Nippon Cable
Chūgoku	Hiroshima Fujita
Kyushu	Nakatsu Club

== League standings ==
=== Kantō ===
Pos	Team	Pld	W	D	L	GF	GA	GD	Pts
1	Nissan Motors	14	9	3	2	35	7	+28	21
2	Toho Titanium	14	8	4	2	25	9	+16	20
3	Saitama Teachers	14	7	3	4	26	22	+4	17
4	Metropolitan Police	14	7	2	5	26	24	+2	16
5	Urawa	14	4	4	6	17	30	−13	12
6	Hitachi Mito	14	4	3	7	12	20	−8	11
7	Ibaraki Hitachi	14	3	4	7	15	27	−12	10
8	Kodama Club	14	1	3	10	7	24	−17	5

Source: RSSSF

=== Hokushin'etsu ===
Pos	Team	Pld	W	D	L	GF	GA	GD	Pts
1	Nissei Plastic Industrial	9	7	2	0	35	6	+29	16
2	YKK	9	8	0	1	26	10	+16	16
3	Fukui Bank	9	6	2	1	36	16	+20	14
4	Toyama Club	9	4	2	3	29	11	+18	10
5	Fukui Teachers	9	4	2	3	22	15	+7	10
6	Yamaga	9	2	4	3	17	14	+3	8
7	Fukui Matsushita	9	2	2	5	15	23	−8	6
8	Fuji Electric Matsumoto	9	2	1	6	11	21	−10	5
9	Niigata	9	2	1	6	14	37	−23	5
10	Nakamuratome	9	0	0	9	6	58	−52	0

Source: RSSSF

=== Tōkai ===
Pos	Team	Pld	W	D	L	GF	GA	GD	Pts
1	Nagoya	13	11	1	1	40	13	+27	23
2	Daikyo Oil	13	8	2	3	32	11	+21	18
3	Maruyasu	13	8	1	4	35	19	+16	17
4	Sumitomo Bakelite	13	6	1	6	20	29	−9	13
5	Wakaayu Club	13	4	3	6	17	26	−9	11
6	Toyoda Automatic Loom Works	13	7	1	5	20	16	+4	15
7	Tomoegawa Papers	13	4	4	5	24	23	+1	12
8	Gifu Teachers	13	5	1	7	14	19	−5	11
9	Mie Teachers	13	4	2	7	23	32	−9	10
10	Toyoda Machine Works	13	0	0	13	4	41	−37	0

Source: RSSSF

=== Kansai ===
Pos	Team	Pld	W	D	L	GF	GA	GD	Pts
1	Dainichi Nippon Cable	16	13	1	2	51	16	+35	27
2	Mitsubishi Heavy Industries Kobe	16	11	1	4	35	19	+16	23
3	Hyogo Teachers	16	6	5	5	38	30	+8	17
4	NTT Kinki	16	7	1	8	31	21	+10	15
5	Nippon Steel Hirohata	16	6	2	8	33	35	−2	14
6	Wakayama Teachers	16	4	6	6	19	23	−4	14
7	Osaka Teachers	16	5	3	8	38	36	+2	13
8	Mitsubishi Heavy Industries Kyoto	16	5	3	8	20	39	−19	13
9	Omi Club	16	2	4	10	18	64	−46	8

Source: RSSSF

=== Chūgoku ===
Pos	Team	Pld	W	D	L	GF	GA	GD	Pts
1	Hiroshima Fujita	14	10	3	1	37	12	+25	23
2	Mitsui Shipbuilding	14	9	4	1	26	13	+13	22
3	Mitsubishi Oil	14	6	5	3	23	17	+6	17
4	Mazda Auto Hiroshima	14	6	3	5	27	22	+5	15
5	Masuda Club	14	5	5	4	20	20	0	15
6	Hiroshima Teachers	14	3	3	8	27	39	−12	9
7	Japan Steel	14	2	4	8	18	30	−12	8
8	Hitachi Kasado	14	1	1	12	10	35	−25	3

Source: RSSSF

=== Kyushu ===
Pos	Team	Pld	W	D	L	GF	GA	GD	Pts
1	Nakatsu Club	7	5	1	1	20	7	+13	11
2	Miyanoh Club	7	3	3	1	10	6	+4	9
3	Kagoshima Club	7	3	2	2	10	5	+5	8
4	Sanwa Rakushu Club	7	3	2	2	11	14	−3	8
5	Mitsubishi Chemical Kurosaki	7	1	5	1	10	9	+1	7
6	Kumamoto Teachers	7	3	1	3	10	9	+1	7
7	Kagoshima Teachers	7	2	1	4	8	14	−6	5
8	Saga Nanyo Club	7	0	1	6	3	18	−15	1

Source: RSSSF
