= 1990 Japanese Regional Leagues =

Japanese amateur leagues football season

Japanese Regional Leagues
- Season: 1990

Statistics of Japanese Regional Leagues for the 1990 season.

== Champions list ==
Region	Champions
Hokkaido	Nippon Steel Muroran
Tohoku	NEC Yamagata
Kantō	Tokyo Gas
Hokushin'etsu	YKK
Tōkai	Seino Transportation
Kansai	Kyoto Police
Chūgoku	Mazda Toyo
Shikoku	Teijin
Kyushu	Tobiume Club

== League standings ==
=== Hokkaido ===
Division 1
Pos	Team	Pld	W	D	L	GF	GA	GD	Pts
1	Nippon Steel Muroran	9	7	2	0	27	7	+20	23
2	Sapporo	9	7	0	2	27	10	+17	21
3	Sapporo Mazda	9	6	1	2	21	4	+17	19
4	Hokuden	9	6	1	2	24	17	+7	19
5	Hakodate Mazda	9	4	1	4	18	20	−2	13
6	Blackpecker Hakodate	9	3	2	4	9	18	−9	11
7	Asahikawa Daisetsu Club	9	2	1	6	12	27	−15	7
8	Sanyo Kokusaku Pulp	9	1	3	5	6	14	−8	6
9	Nippon Oil Muroran	9	1	3	5	8	19	−11	6
10	Sapporo University OB	9	1	0	8	9	25	−16	3

Source: RSSSF
Rules for classification: 3 points for a win

Division 2
Pos	Team	Pld	W	D	L	GF	GA	GD	Pts
1	Hakodate City Government	5	3	2	0	16	3	+13	11
2	Japan Steel Works Muroran	5	3	1	1	11	6	+5	10
3	Hokushukai	5	2	2	1	10	7	+3	8
4	Asahikawa Shukyudan	5	2	1	2	5	7	−2	7
5	Otaru Shuyukai	5	2	0	3	11	10	+1	6
6	Red Panther	5	0	0	5	0	20	−20	0

Source: RSSSF
Rules for classification: 3 points for a win

=== Tohoku ===
Pos	Team	Pld	W	D	L	GF	GA	GD	Pts
1	NEC Yamagata	14	12	2	0	42	6	+36	26
2	TDK	14	9	3	2	31	13	+18	21
3	Akita City Government	14	9	0	5	33	16	+17	18
4	Matsushima	14	7	3	4	22	13	+9	17
5	Morioka Zebra	14	4	2	8	13	24	−11	10
6	Nakata Club	14	3	3	8	15	25	−10	9
7	Ishinomaki City Government	14	3	0	11	14	34	−20	6
8	Nitto Boseki Fukushima	14	1	3	10	7	46	−39	5

Source: RSSSF
Rules for classification: 2 points for a win

=== Kantō ===
Pos	Team	Pld	W	D	L	GF	GA	GD	Pts
1	Tokyo Gas	18	15	3	0	48	13	+35	33
2	Nissan Motors Farm	18	12	2	4	50	22	+28	26
3	Ibaraki Hitachi	18	6	8	4	23	24	−1	20
4	Kanagawa Teachers	18	7	5	6	31	29	+2	19
5	Saitama Teachers	18	7	4	7	29	24	+5	18
6	Chiba Teachers	18	6	3	9	28	29	−1	15
7	Tochigi Teachers	18	5	4	9	32	41	−9	14
8	Ibaraki Teachers	18	6	2	10	19	37	−18	14
9	Furukawa Chiba	18	4	4	10	24	32	−8	12
10	Kanto Motors	18	4	1	13	12	45	−33	9

Source: RSSSF
Rules for classification: 2 points for a win

=== Hokushin'etsu ===
Pos	Team	Pld	W	D	L	GF	GA	GD	Pts
1	YKK	9	8	1	0	37	5	+32	17
2	Nissei Plastic Industrial	9	5	3	1	10	4	+6	13
3	Niigata eleven	9	4	2	3	17	10	+7	10
4	Yamaga	9	3	4	2	16	14	+2	10
5	Kanazawa	9	4	1	4	13	17	−4	9
6	Teihens	9	3	2	4	12	18	−6	8
7	Toyama Club	9	3	2	4	11	20	−9	8
8	Seiyū Club	9	3	1	5	11	13	−2	7
9	Fukui Teachers	9	2	2	5	9	20	−11	6
10	Naoetsu	9	0	2	7	4	19	−15	2

Source: RSSSF
Rules for classification: 2 points for a win

=== Tōkai ===
Pos	Team	Pld	W	D	L	GF	GA	GD	Pts
1	Seino Transportation	16	14	1	1	39	11	+28	29
2	Chuo Bohan	16	9	2	5	28	20	+8	20
3	Fujieda City Government	16	7	5	4	27	19	+8	19
4	Yamaha Club	16	7	3	6	26	21	+5	17
5	Jatco	16	7	3	6	31	27	+4	17
6	Toyoda Machine Works	16	6	2	8	21	29	−8	14
7	Denso	16	8	3	5	36	23	+13	19
8	Fuyo Club	16	5	7	4	22	21	+1	17
9	Maruyasu	16	5	5	6	23	25	−2	15
10	Nagoya	16	3	4	9	18	30	−12	10
11	Toyota	16	2	6	8	13	33	−20	10
12	Shizuoka Gas	16	1	3	12	11	36	−25	5

Source: RSSSF
Rules for classification: 2 points for a win

=== Kansai ===
Pos	Team	Pld	W	D	L	GF	GA	GD	Pts
1	Kyoto Police	20	12	7	1	50	18	+32	31
2	Osaka University of Health and Sport sciences Club	20	12	4	4	41	13	+28	28
3	NTT Kansai	20	12	4	4	32	18	+14	28
4	Mitsubishi Motors Kyoto	20	9	5	6	31	25	+6	23
5	Sanyo Electric Sumoto	20	5	10	5	28	25	+3	20
6	West Osaka	20	6	5	9	19	25	−6	17
7	Central Kobe	20	6	5	9	22	33	−11	17
8	Tanabe Pharmaceuticals	20	6	4	10	26	42	−16	16
9	Mitsubishi Cable Industries	20	5	4	11	14	30	−16	14
10	Ain Food	20	4	6	10	18	30	−12	14
11	Mitsubishi Heavy Industries Kobe	20	2	8	10	21	43	−22	12

Source: RSSSF
Rules for classification: 3 points for a win

=== Chūgoku ===
Pos	Team	Pld	W	D	L	GF	GA	GD	Pts
1	Mazda Toyo	16	12	1	3	43	14	+29	25
2	Mazda Auto Hiroshima	16	11	2	3	33	18	+15	24
3	Mitsubishi Motors Mizushima	16	9	4	3	41	22	+19	22
4	Yamaguchi Teachers	16	7	3	6	32	25	+7	17
5	Hiroshima Teachers	16	6	4	6	27	33	−6	16
6	Hiroshima Fujita	16	6	3	7	32	37	−5	15
7	Okayama Teachers	16	3	5	8	24	42	−18	11
8	Mitsubishi Oil	16	3	4	9	17	33	−16	10
9	Yonago	16	1	2	13	11	36	−25	4

Source: RSSSF
Rules for classification: 2 points for a win

=== Shikoku ===
Pos	Team	Pld	W	D	L	GF	GA	GD	Pts
1	Teijin	14	14	0	0	55	2	+53	28
2	NTT Shikoku	14	10	1	3	54	20	+34	21
3	Alex	14	7	3	4	34	29	+5	17
4	Nangoku Club	14	7	2	5	30	30	0	16
5	Matsuyama Club	14	4	2	8	39	31	+8	10
6	Takasho	14	3	3	8	15	31	−16	9
7	Sportsshop Ikeda	14	3	1	10	18	74	−56	7
8	Imabari Club	14	1	2	11	11	39	−28	4

Source: RSSSF
Rules for classification: 2 points for a win

=== Kyushu ===
Pos	Team	Pld	W	D	L	GF	GA	GD	Pts
1	Tobiume Club	9	9	0	0	28	2	+26	18
2	Mitsubishi Chemical Kurosaki	9	6	2	1	30	10	+20	14
3	Mitsubishi Heavy Industries Nagasaki	9	6	2	1	15	8	+7	14
4	Kagoshima Teachers	9	4	4	1	12	9	+3	12
5	Nippon Steel Ōita	9	4	1	4	14	12	+2	9
6	NTT Kyushu	9	3	0	6	13	16	−3	6
7	Miyazaki Teachers	9	2	2	5	14	30	−16	6
8	Saga Nanyo Club	9	2	1	6	13	21	−8	5
9	Kyushu Matsushita Electric	9	2	0	7	13	31	−18	4
10	Nakatsu Club	9	0	2	7	12	25	−13	2

Source: RSSSF
Rules for classification: 2 points for a win
