= 1977 Japanese Regional Leagues =

Japanese amateur leagues football season

Japanese Regional Leagues
- Season: 1977

Statistics of Japanese Regional Leagues for the 1977 season.

== Champions list ==
Region	Champions
Tohoku	Nippon Steel Kamaishi
Kantō	Toshiba
Hokushin'etsu	Nissei Plastic Industrial
Tōkai	Yamaha Motors
Kansai	NTT Kinki
Chūgoku	Mitsui Shipbuilding
Shikoku	Showa Club
Kyushu	Kumamoto Teachers

== League standings ==
=== Tohoku ===
Pos	Team	Pld	W	D	L	GF	GA	GD	Pts
1	Nippon Steel Kamaishi	8	8	0	0	29	6	+23	16
2	Morioka Zebra	8	5	0	3	20	12	+8	10
3	Towada Kickers	8	3	0	5	12	19	−7	6
4	Tohoku Oil	8	3	0	5	10	18	−8	6
5	Kureha	8	1	0	7	12	28	−16	2

Source: RSSSF

=== Kantō ===
Pos	Team	Pld	W	D	L	GF	GA	GD	Pts
1	Toshiba	16	14	1	1	39	7	+32	29
2	Toho Titanium	16	12	1	3	36	12	+24	25
3	Ibaraki Hitachi	16	9	2	5	23	22	+1	20
4	Metropolitan Police	16	4	8	4	24	27	−3	16
5	Hitachi Mito	16	7	1	8	23	25	−2	15
6	Saitama Teachers	16	6	1	9	24	28	−4	13
7	Kodama Club	16	5	3	8	20	30	−10	13
8	Tokyo Gas	16	3	3	10	11	27	−16	9
9	Urawa	16	2	0	14	11	33	−22	4

Source: RSSSF

=== Hokushin'etsu ===
Pos	Team	Pld	W	D	L	GF	GA	GD	Pts
1	Nissei Plastic Industrial	9	6	2	1	25	3	+22	14
2	Fukui Bank	9	5	4	0	26	10	+16	14
3	YKK	9	4	4	1	15	15	0	12
4	Nagano Teachers	9	4	1	4	17	30	−13	9
5	Teihens	9	3	2	4	17	16	+1	8
6	Toyama Club	9	3	2	4	15	15	0	8
7	Fukui Teachers	9	4	0	5	17	18	−1	8
8	Yamaga	9	2	3	4	17	22	−5	7
9	Fuji Electric Matsumoto	9	2	1	6	7	22	−15	5
10	Fukui Matsushita	9	2	1	6	15	20	−5	5

Source: RSSSF

=== Tōkai ===
Pos	Team	Pld	W	D	L	GF	GA	GD	Pts
1	Yamaha Motors	13	11	1	1	43	6	+37	23
2	Nagoya	13	9	1	3	30	9	+21	19
3	Daikyo Oil	13	9	1	3	33	12	+21	19
4	Tomoegawa Papers	13	7	0	6	21	39	−18	14
5	Toyoda Automatic Loom Works	13	3	3	7	17	36	−19	9
6	Maruyasu	13	5	3	5	26	28	−2	13
7	Wakaayu Club	13	5	2	6	24	21	+3	12
8	Sumitomo Bakelite	13	5	2	6	26	26	0	12
9	Gifu Teachers	12	2	1	9	13	33	−20	5
10	Mie Teachers	12	0	2	10	11	34	−23	2

Source: RSSSF

=== Kansai ===
Pos	Team	Pld	W	D	L	GF	GA	GD	Pts
1	NTT Kinki	16	10	5	1	40	16	+24	25
2	Dainichi Nippon Cable	16	11	3	2	34	12	+22	25
3	Hyōgo Teachers	16	8	2	6	40	29	+11	18
4	Nippon Steel Hirohata	16	6	6	4	26	23	+3	18
5	Mitsubishi Heavy Industries Kobe	16	6	5	5	27	14	+13	17
6	Yuasa Batteries	16	6	4	6	34	33	+1	16
7	Osaka Teachers	16	4	6	6	33	32	+1	14
8	Wakayama Teachers	16	2	4	10	17	41	−24	8
9	Omi Club	16	1	1	14	14	65	−51	3

Source: RSSSF

=== Chūgoku ===
Pos	Team	Pld	W	D	L	GF	GA	GD	Pts
1	Mitsui Shipbuilding	14	10	4	0	32	9	+23	24
2	Mazda Auto Hiroshima	14	6	5	3	28	19	+9	17
3	Mitsubishi Oil	14	5	6	3	23	17	+6	16
4	Hiroshima Fujita	14	5	4	5	20	19	+1	14
5	Masuda Club	14	5	3	6	30	24	+6	13
6	Tanabe Pharmaceuticals	14	5	2	7	18	18	0	12
7	Japan Steel	14	2	6	6	10	18	−8	10
8	Hitachi Kasado	14	2	2	10	15	52	−37	6

Source: RSSSF

=== Shikoku ===
Pos	Team	Pld	W	D	L	GF	GA	GD	Pts
1	Showa Club	14	13	1	0	46	9	+37	27
2	Imabari Club	14	8	2	4	42	21	+21	18
3	Otsuka Pharmaceutical	14	8	2	4	47	31	+16	18
4	Teijin Matsuyama	14	8	2	4	37	25	+12	18
5	Nangoku Club	14	6	2	6	32	33	−1	14
6	Takasho OB Club	14	4	2	8	32	54	−22	10
7	Ogata Club	14	1	4	9	21	39	−18	6
8	Kogei Club	14	0	1	13	11	56	−45	1

Source: RSSSF

=== Kyushu ===
Pos	Team	Pld	W	D	L	GF	GA	GD	Pts
1	Kumamoto Teachers	7	6	0	1	15	8	+7	12
2	Nakatsu Club	7	5	1	1	17	7	+10	11
3	Mitsubishi Chemical Kurosaki	7	5	0	2	21	12	+9	10
4	Saga Nanyo Club	7	4	0	3	11	12	−1	8
5	Miyanoh Club	7	3	0	4	10	12	−2	6
6	Sanwa Rakushu Club	7	1	1	5	7	12	−5	3
7	Kagoshima Club	7	1	1	5	5	13	−8	3
8	Kagoshima Teachers	7	1	1	5	10	20	−10	3

Source: RSSSF
