= 1978 Japanese Regional Leagues =

Japanese amateur leagues football season

Japanese Regional Leagues
- Season: 1978

Statistics of Japanese Regional Leagues for the 1978 season.

== Champions list ==
Region	Champions
Hokkaido	Hakodate 76
Tohoku	Nippon Steel Kamaishi
Kantō	Toho Titanium
Hokushinetsu	Nissei Plastic Industrial
Tōkai	Yamaha Motors
Kansai	Dainichi Nippon Cable
Chūgoku	Mazda Auto Hiroshima
Shikoku	Otsuka Pharmaceutical
Kyushu	Nakatsu Club

== League standings ==
=== Hokkaido ===
Pos	Team	Pld	W	PKW	PKL	L	GF	GA	GD	Pts
1	Hakodate 76	3	3	0	0	0	14	2	+12	12
2	Hokushukai	3	1	1	0	1	3	4	−1	6
3	Hakodate Mazda	3	1	0	0	2	9	9	0	4
4	Sapporo	3	0	0	1	2	4	15	−11	1

Source: RSSSF

=== Tohoku ===
Pos	Team	Pld	W	D	L	GF	GA	GD	Pts
1	Nippon Steel Kamaishi	7	7	0	0	35	2	+33	14
2	Kureha	8	4	1	3	14	25	−11	9
3	Morioka Zebra	8	3	2	3	22	15	+7	8
4	Towada Kickers	8	3	1	4	15	25	−10	7
5	Tohoku Oil	7	0	0	7	4	23	−19	0

Source: RSSSF

=== Kanto ===
Pos	Team	Pld	W	PKW	PKL	L	GF	GA	GD	Pts
1	Toho Titanium	18	13	3	1	1	34	12	+22	59
2	Furukawa Chiba	18	11	2	1	4	38	23	+15	49
3	Yokogawa Electric	18	8	3	3	4	41	20	+21	41
4	Ibaraki Hitachi	18	8	2	2	6	24	23	+1	38
5	Metropolitan Police	18	7	2	1	8	23	27	−4	33
6	Hitachi Mito Katsuta	18	6	3	1	8	20	24	−4	31
7	Saitama Teachers	18	5	1	5	7	28	29	−1	27
8	Yamatake Honeywell	18	6	0	1	11	23	39	−16	25
9	Tokyo Gas	18	4	1	2	11	24	37	−13	20
10	Kodama Club	18	4	1	1	12	15	36	−21	19

Source: RSSSF

=== Hokushin'etsu ===
Pos	Team	Pld	W	D	L	GF	GA	GD	Pts
1	Nissei Plastic Industrial	9	7	2	0	33	4	+29	16
2	YKK	9	7	1	1	17	6	+11	15
3	Toyama Club	9	6	1	2	19	16	+3	13
4	Fukui Teachers	9	6	0	3	26	13	+13	12
5	Fukui Bank	9	4	1	4	21	19	+2	9
6	Teihens	9	4	0	5	16	21	−5	8
7	Nagano Teachers	9	4	0	5	22	29	−7	8
8	Fuji Electric Matsumoto	9	2	1	6	7	17	−10	5
9	Uozu Club	9	1	0	8	14	32	−18	2
10	Yamaga	9	1	0	8	9	27	−18	2

Source: RSSSF

=== Tokai ===
Pos	Team	Pld	W	D	L	GF	GA	GD	Pts
1	Yamaha Motors	13	13	0	0	60	4	+56	26
2	Daikyo Oil	13	9	1	3	32	10	+22	19
3	Maruyasu	13	5	3	5	27	26	+1	13
4	Honda Hamayukai	13	5	2	6	27	28	−1	12
5	Sumitomo Bakelite	13	5	1	7	26	46	−20	11
6	Nagoya	13	5	4	4	25	25	0	14
7	Minolta Camera	13	5	3	5	25	23	+2	13
8	Toyoda Automatic Loom Works	13	4	1	8	15	38	−23	9
9	Wakaayu Club	13	2	3	8	14	27	−13	7
10	Tomoegawa Papers	13	3	0	10	15	39	−24	6

Source: RSSSF

=== Kansai ===
Pos	Team	Pld	W	D	L	GF	GA	GD	Pts
1	Dainichi Nippon Cable	16	10	3	3	40	19	+21	23
2	NTT Kinki	16	8	4	4	36	23	+13	20
3	Hyōgo Teachers	16	6	7	3	31	22	+9	19
4	Mitsubishi Heavy Industries Kobe	16	6	6	4	29	29	0	18
5	Mitsubishi Motors Kyoto	16	5	7	4	28	25	+3	17
6	Nippon Steel Hirohata	16	5	5	6	27	32	−5	15
7	Osaka Teachers	16	5	4	7	30	31	−1	14
8	Yuasa Batteries	16	6	2	8	20	26	−6	14
9	Wakayama Teachers	16	1	2	13	8	42	−34	4

Source: RSSSF

=== Chūgoku ===
Pos	Team	Pld	W	D	L	GF	GA	GD	Pts
1	Mazda Auto Hiroshima	14	8	3	3	28	22	+6	19
2	Mitsui Shipbuilding	14	7	3	4	27	16	+11	17
3	Tanabe Pharmaceuticals	14	6	5	3	25	22	+3	17
4	Mitsubishi Oil	14	7	0	7	24	20	+4	14
5	Kawasaki Steel Mizushima	14	5	4	5	25	26	−1	14
6	Hitachi Kasado	14	5	2	7	29	30	−1	12
7	Hiroshima Fujita	14	5	2	7	18	27	−9	12
8	Masuda Club	14	3	1	10	13	26	−13	7

Source: RSSSF

=== Shikoku ===
Pos	Team	Pld	W	D	L	GF	GA	GD	Pts
1	Otsuka Pharmaceutical	14	11	0	3	50	16	+34	22
2	Showa Club	14	8	3	3	31	18	+13	19
3	Nangoku Club	14	8	2	4	40	24	+16	18
4	Imabari Club	14	8	2	4	36	25	+11	18
5	Ogata Club	14	7	1	6	29	51	−22	15
6	Daio Paper	14	4	3	7	31	32	−1	11
7	Kogei Club	14	2	1	11	14	35	−21	5
8	Takasho OB Club	14	1	2	11	18	48	−30	4

Source: RSSSF

=== Kyushu ===
Pos	Team	Pld	W	D	L	GF	GA	GD	Pts
1	Nakatsu Club	7	6	0	1	18	8	+10	12
2	Mitsubishi Chemical Kurosaki	7	3	2	2	16	10	+6	8
3	Saga Nanyo Club	7	3	2	2	6	11	−5	8
4	Nippon Steel Ōita	7	3	1	3	14	10	+4	7
5	Kagoshima Teachers	7	2	3	2	9	6	+3	7
6	Miyanoh Club	7	2	3	2	5	10	−5	7
7	Kumamoto Teachers	7	3	0	4	9	11	−2	6
8	Sanwa Rakushu Club	7	0	1	6	7	18	−11	1

Source: RSSSF
