= 1988 Japanese Regional Leagues =

Japanese amateur leagues football season

Japanese Regional Leagues
- Season: 1988

Statistics of Japanese Regional Leagues for the 1988 season.

== Champions list ==
| Region | Champions |
|---|---|
| Hokkaido | Sapporo Mazda |
| Tohoku | TDK |
| Kantō | Yomiuri Juniors |
| Hokushin'etsu | YKK |
| Tōkai | Chuo Bohan |
| Kansai | Kyoto Shiko Club |
| Chūgoku | Mazda Auto Hiroshima |
| Shikoku | NTT Shikoku |
| Kyushu | Nippon Steel Ōita |

== League standings ==
=== Hokkaido ===
| Pos | Team | Pld | W | D | L | GF | GA | GD | Pts |
|---|---|---|---|---|---|---|---|---|---|
| 1 | Sapporo Mazda | 9 | 9 | 0 | 0 | 39 | 2 | +37 | 18 |
| 2 | Sapporo | 9 | 7 | 1 | 1 | 24 | 6 | +18 | 15 |
| 3 | Hakodate Mazda | 9 | 6 | 0 | 3 | 17 | 6 | +11 | 12 |
| 4 | Blackpecker Hakodate | 9 | 3 | 2 | 4 | 11 | 15 | −4 | 8 |
| 5 | Sapporo University OB | 9 | 3 | 2 | 4 | 9 | 14 | −5 | 8 |
| 6 | Asahikawa Daisetsu Club | 9 | 3 | 1 | 5 | 16 | 16 | 0 | 7 |
| 7 | Nippon Oil Muroran | 9 | 2 | 3 | 4 | 11 | 21 | −10 | 7 |
| 8 | Otaru Shuyukai | 9 | 3 | 1 | 5 | 8 | 29 | −21 | 7 |
| 9 | Japan Steel Muroran | 9 | 1 | 3 | 5 | 10 | 20 | −10 | 5 |
| 10 | Hokushukai | 9 | 1 | 1 | 7 | 4 | 20 | −16 | 3 |

Source: RSSSF

=== Tohoku ===
| Pos | Team | Pld | W | D | L | GF | GA | GD | Pts |
|---|---|---|---|---|---|---|---|---|---|
| 1 | TDK | 14 | 12 | 0 | 2 | 48 | 13 | +35 | 24 |
| 2 | Matsushima | 14 | 11 | 0 | 3 | 53 | 11 | +42 | 22 |
| 3 | Akita City Government | 14 | 10 | 2 | 2 | 57 | 17 | +40 | 22 |
| 4 | Morioka Zebra | 14 | 6 | 1 | 7 | 25 | 32 | −7 | 13 |
| 5 | Ishinomaki City Government | 14 | 6 | 1 | 7 | 18 | 31 | −13 | 13 |
| 6 | Kureha | 14 | 4 | 1 | 9 | 24 | 42 | −18 | 9 |
| 7 | Nitto Boseki Fukushima | 14 | 3 | 1 | 10 | 16 | 42 | −26 | 7 |
| 8 | Akisho Club | 14 | 1 | 0 | 13 | 8 | 61 | −53 | 2 |

Source: RSSSF

=== Kantō ===
| Pos | Team | Pld | W | D | L | GF | GA | GD | Pts |
|---|---|---|---|---|---|---|---|---|---|
| 1 | Yomiuri Juniors | 18 | 11 | 5 | 2 | 24 | 11 | +13 | 27 |
| 2 | Tokyo Gas | 18 | 11 | 4 | 3 | 32 | 18 | +14 | 25 (Note: 1 point deducted?) |
| 3 | Chiba Teachers | 18 | 9 | 5 | 4 | 33 | 27 | +6 | 23 |
| 4 | Furukawa Chiba | 18 | 8 | 4 | 6 | 29 | 18 | +11 | 20 |
| 5 | Saitama Teachers | 18 | 7 | 4 | 7 | 32 | 30 | +2 | 18 |
| 6 | Tokyo Teachers | 18 | 5 | 5 | 8 | 21 | 25 | −4 | 15 |
| 7 | Kanagawa Teachers | 18 | 7 | 1 | 10 | 17 | 29 | −12 | 15 |
| 8 | Ibaraki Hitachi | 18 | 4 | 6 | 8 | 15 | 17 | −2 | 14 |
| 9 | Ibaraki Teachers | 18 | 3 | 6 | 9 | 20 | 31 | −11 | 12 |
| 10 | Nirasaki Club | 18 | 4 | 2 | 12 | 18 | 35 | −17 | 10 |

Source: RSSSF

=== Hokushin'etsu ===
| Pos | Team | Pld | W | D | L | GF | GA | GD | Pts |
|---|---|---|---|---|---|---|---|---|---|
| 1 | YKK | 9 | 9 | 0 | 0 | 26 | 6 | +20 | 18 |
| 2 | Nissei Plastic Industrial | 9 | 7 | 0 | 2 | 32 | 10 | +22 | 14 |
| 3 | Yamaga | 9 | 4 | 3 | 2 | 19 | 8 | +11 | 11 |
| 4 | Niigata eleven | 9 | 4 | 2 | 3 | 12 | 13 | −1 | 10 |
| 5 | Toyama Club | 9 | 4 | 1 | 4 | 22 | 16 | +6 | 9 |
| 6 | Seiyū Club | 9 | 2 | 3 | 4 | 8 | 15 | −7 | 7 |
| 7 | Teihens | 9 | 2 | 3 | 4 | 12 | 20 | −8 | 7 |
| 8 | Fukui Teachers | 9 | 3 | 1 | 5 | 9 | 21 | −12 | 7 |
| 9 | Fujitsu Nagano | 9 | 2 | 2 | 5 | 13 | 22 | −9 | 6 |
| 10 | Kanazawa | 9 | 0 | 1 | 8 | 4 | 26 | −22 | 1 |

Source: RSSSF

=== Tōkai ===
| Pos | Team | Pld | W | D | L | GF | GA | GD | Pts |
|---|---|---|---|---|---|---|---|---|---|
| 1 | Chuo Bohan | 17 | 13 | 3 | 1 | 41 | 12 | +29 | 29 |
| 2 | Seino Transportation | 17 | 11 | 5 | 1 | 45 | 12 | +33 | 27 |
| 3 | Jatco | 17 | 12 | 1 | 4 | 36 | 15 | +21 | 25 |
| 4 | Maruyasu | 17 | 8 | 0 | 9 | 25 | 23 | +2 | 16 |
| 5 | Toyoda Machine Works | 17 | 7 | 2 | 8 | 24 | 32 | −8 | 16 |
| 6 | Fuyo Club | 17 | 6 | 3 | 8 | 20 | 27 | −7 | 15 |
| 7 | Nagoya | 18 | 7 | 5 | 6 | 31 | 32 | −1 | 19 |
| 8 | Yamakiya Club | 18 | 8 | 2 | 8 | 26 | 30 | −4 | 18 |
| 9 | Yamaha Club | 18 | 6 | 4 | 8 | 26 | 29 | −3 | 16 |
| 10 | Mitsui Du Pont Fluorochemicals | 18 | 5 | 5 | 8 | 22 | 27 | −5 | 15 |
| 11 | Shimizu Club | 18 | 6 | 1 | 11 | 23 | 40 | −17 | 13 |
| 12 | Shizuoka Gas | 18 | 3 | 5 | 10 | 21 | 42 | −21 | 11 |
| 13 | Honda Hamamatsu | 18 | 3 | 2 | 13 | 21 | 40 | −19 | 8 |

Source: RSSSF

=== Kansai ===
| Pos | Team | Pld | W | D | L | GF | GA | GD | Pts |
|---|---|---|---|---|---|---|---|---|---|
| 1 | Kyoto Shiko Club | 15 | 11 | 2 | 2 | 31 | 10 | +21 | 24 |
| 2 | Mitsubishi Motors Kyoto | 15 | 11 | 1 | 3 | 30 | 13 | +17 | 23 |
| 3 | Mitsubishi Cable Industries | 15 | 8 | 2 | 5 | 25 | 17 | +8 | 18 |
| 4 | Sanyo Electric Sumoto | 15 | 6 | 4 | 5 | 25 | 19 | +6 | 16 |
| 5 | Central Kobe | 15 | 5 | 4 | 6 | 22 | 32 | −10 | 14 |
| 6 | Kyoto Police | 15 | 5 | 3 | 7 | 25 | 23 | +2 | 13 |
| 7 | Osaka University of Commerce Ain | 14 | 7 | 1 | 6 | 30 | 24 | +6 | 15 |
| 8 | Tanabe Pharmaceuticals | 14 | 5 | 3 | 6 | 23 | 24 | −1 | 13 |
| 9 | Osaka Teachers | 14 | 3 | 3 | 8 | 15 | 27 | −12 | 9 |
| 10 | West Osaka | 14 | 2 | 4 | 8 | 16 | 29 | −13 | 8 |
| 11 | Matsushita Electron | 14 | 3 | 1 | 10 | 13 | 37 | −24 | 7 |

Source: RSSSF

=== Chūgoku ===
| Pos | Team | Pld | W | D | L | GF | GA | GD | Pts |
|---|---|---|---|---|---|---|---|---|---|
| 1 | Mazda Auto Hiroshima | 16 | 16 | 0 | 0 | 50 | 6 | +44 | 32 |
| 2 | Mazda Toyo | 16 | 10 | 3 | 3 | 39 | 23 | +16 | 23 |
| 3 | Yamaguchi Teachers | 16 | 7 | 3 | 6 | 34 | 26 | +8 | 17 |
| 4 | Hiroshima Fujita | 16 | 5 | 5 | 6 | 31 | 28 | +3 | 15 |
| 5 | Hiroshima Teachers | 16 | 4 | 7 | 5 | 24 | 24 | 0 | 15 |
| 6 | Yonago | 16 | 3 | 8 | 5 | 16 | 20 | −4 | 14 |
| 7 | Tottori Teachers | 16 | 5 | 3 | 8 | 26 | 31 | −5 | 13 |
| 8 | Mitsubishi Oil | 16 | 3 | 5 | 8 | 15 | 32 | −17 | 11 |
| 9 | Hiroshima City Government | 16 | 1 | 2 | 13 | 16 | 61 | −45 | 4 |

Source: RSSSF

=== Shikoku ===
| Pos | Team | Pld | W | D | L | GF | GA | GD | Pts |
|---|---|---|---|---|---|---|---|---|---|
| 1 | NTT Shikoku | 14 | 12 | 1 | 1 | 53 | 12 | +41 | 25 |
| 2 | Matsuyama Club | 14 | 8 | 2 | 4 | 39 | 21 | +18 | 18 |
| 3 | Imabari Club | 14 | 7 | 4 | 3 | 33 | 19 | +14 | 18 |
| 4 | Nangoku Club | 14 | 7 | 2 | 5 | 43 | 26 | +17 | 16 |
| 5 | Daio Paper | 14 | 5 | 3 | 6 | 38 | 47 | −9 | 13 |
| 6 | Alex SC | 14 | 4 | 2 | 8 | 24 | 41 | −17 | 10 |
| 7 | Takasho OB Club | 14 | 5 | 0 | 9 | 16 | 42 | −26 | 10 |
| 8 | Showa Club | 14 | 1 | 0 | 13 | 15 | 53 | −38 | 2 |

Source: RSSSF

=== Kyushu ===
| Pos | Team | Pld | W | D | L | GF | GA | GD | Pts |
|---|---|---|---|---|---|---|---|---|---|
| 1 | Nippon Steel Ōita | 9 | 6 | 2 | 1 | 12 | 6 | +6 | 14 |
| 2 | Tobiume Club | 9 | 5 | 3 | 1 | 18 | 10 | +8 | 13 |
| 3 | Mitsubishi Chemical Kurosaki | 9 | 5 | 2 | 2 | 31 | 13 | +18 | 12 |
| 4 | Nakatsu Club | 9 | 4 | 1 | 4 | 16 | 18 | −2 | 9 |
| 5 | Kyushu Matsushita Electric | 9 | 2 | 4 | 3 | 15 | 18 | −3 | 8 |
| 6 | Kagoshima Teachers | 9 | 3 | 2 | 4 | 10 | 12 | −2 | 8 |
| 7 | Mitsubishi Heavy Industries Nagasaki | 9 | 2 | 4 | 3 | 6 | 11 | −5 | 8 |
| 8 | Saga Nanyo Club | 9 | 3 | 2 | 4 | 9 | 18 | −9 | 8 |
| 9 | NTT Kumamoto | 9 | 2 | 2 | 5 | 7 | 14 | −7 | 6 |
| 10 | Kumamoto Teachers | 9 | 1 | 2 | 6 | 14 | 18 | −4 | 4 |

Source: RSSSF
