= 1980 Japanese Regional Leagues =

Japanese amateur leagues football season

Japanese Regional Leagues
- Season: 1980

Statistics of Japanese Regional Leagues for the 1980 season.

== Champions list ==
Region	Champions
Hokkaido	Hakodate 76
Tohoku	Morioka Zebra
Kantō	Saitama Teachers
Hokushin'etsu	Fukui Teachers
Tōkai	Fujieda City Government
Kansai	NTT Kinki
Chūgoku	Kawasaki Steel Mizushima
Shikoku	Nangoku Club
Kyushu	Nakatsu Club

== League standings ==
=== Hokkaido ===
Pos	Team	Pld	W	D	L	GF	GA	GD	Pts
1	Hakodate 76	7	6	1	0	24	5	+19	13
2	Nippon Oil Muroran	7	5	1	1	12	4	+8	11
3	Nippon Steel Muroran	7	4	1	2	19	11	+8	9
4	Hakodate Mazda	7	3	2	2	14	7	+7	8
5	Hokushukai	7	3	1	3	13	15	−2	7
6	Sapporo	7	3	0	4	13	13	0	6
7	Muroran Club	7	1	0	6	4	25	−21	2
8	Hakoo Club	7	0	0	7	4	23	−19	0

Source: RSSSF

=== Tohoku ===
Pos	Team	Pld	W	D	L	GF	GA	GD	Pts
1	Morioka Zebra	12	10	1	1	29	12	+17	21
2	Matsushima	11	8	1	2	36	10	+26	17
3	Nippon Steel Kamaishi	10	6	1	3	26	12	+14	13
4	Kureha	12	3	3	6	15	18	−3	9
5	Towada Kickers	11	4	0	7	19	35	−16	8
6	Akita Toyota	12	2	3	7	19	31	−12	7
7	Nitto Boseki Fukushima	12	2	1	9	8	34	−26	5

Source: RSSSF

=== Kantō ===
Pos	Team	Pld	W	D	L	GF	GA	GD	Pts
1	Saitama Teachers	18	11	4	3	51	22	+29	26
2	Furukawa Chiba	18	10	4	4	36	20	+16	24
3	Toho Titanium	18	9	4	5	23	14	+9	22
4	Ibaraki Teachers	18	8	5	5	31	24	+7	21
5	Metropolitan Police	18	7	5	6	26	28	−2	19
6	NTT Kanto	18	7	3	8	23	22	+1	17
7	Hitachi Mito Katsuta	18	8	1	9	19	21	−2	17
8	Ibaraki Hitachi	18	3	6	9	16	25	−9	12
9	Yokogawa Electric	18	5	2	11	27	43	−16	12
10	Yamatake Honeywell	18	3	4	11	15	48	−33	10

Source: RSSSF

=== Hokushin'etsu ===
Pos	Team	Pld	W	D	L	GF	GA	GD	Pts
1	Fukui Teachers	9	7	1	1	30	10	+20	15
2	YKK	9	7	1	1	24	10	+14	15
3	Nissei Plastic Industrial	9	7	0	2	36	6	+30	14
4	Yamaga	9	6	2	1	19	8	+11	14
5	Toyama Club	9	5	1	3	26	12	+14	11
6	Fukui Bank	9	3	1	5	23	23	0	7
7	Uozu Club	9	3	0	6	15	26	−11	6
8	Ono Club	9	1	2	6	10	33	−23	4
9	Teihens	9	1	1	7	12	31	−19	3
10	Japan Air Self-Defense Force Komatsu	9	0	1	8	7	43	−36	1

Source: RSSSF

=== Tōkai ===
Pos	Team	Pld	W	D	L	GF	GA	GD	Pts
1	Fujieda City Government	13	9	2	2	26	9	+17	20
2	Nagoya	13	8	3	2	33	16	+17	19
3	Maruyasu	13	8	1	4	45	17	+28	17
4	Shizuoka Gas	13	7	2	4	30	23	+7	16
5	Tomoegawa Papers	13	4	4	5	22	25	−3	12
6	Minolta Camera	13	7	0	6	32	26	+6	14
7	Honda Hamayukai	13	6	0	7	24	28	−4	12
8	Honda Suzuka	13	3	2	8	19	35	−16	8
9	Wakaayu Club	13	3	1	9	17	50	−33	7
10	Sumitomo Bakelite	13	2	1	10	22	41	−19	5

Source: RSSSF

=== Kansai ===
Pos	Team	Pld	W	D	L	GF	GA	GD	Pts
1	NTT Kinki	18	14	3	1	38	12	+26	31
2	Mitsubishi Motors Kyoto	18	9	6	3	41	23	+18	24
3	Dainichi Nippon Cable	18	8	6	4	33	17	+16	22
4	Osaka Gas	18	9	4	5	24	29	−5	22
5	Kyoto Shiko Club	18	8	3	7	33	18	+15	19
6	Osaka Teachers	18	6	5	7	22	26	−4	17
7	Hyōgo Teachers	18	6	5	7	26	31	−5	17
8	Mitsubishi Heavy Industries Kobe	18	5	5	8	16	23	−7	15
9	Yuasa Batteries	18	3	5	10	22	41	−19	11
10	Nippon Steel Hirohata	18	0	2	16	16	51	−35	2

Source: RSSSF

=== Chūgoku ===
Pos	Team	Pld	W	D	L	GF	GA	GD	Pts
1	Kawasaki Steel Mizushima	14	9	2	3	30	14	+16	20
2	Masuda Club	14	8	4	2	26	20	+6	20
3	Tanabe Pharmaceuticals	14	8	2	4	22	19	+3	18
4	Mitsui Shipbuilding	14	3	6	5	22	21	+1	12
5	Mazda Auto Hiroshima	14	5	2	7	23	25	−2	12
6	Yamaguchi Teachers	14	4	3	7	27	30	−3	11
7	Mitsubishi Motors Mizushima	14	3	5	6	12	22	−10	11
8	Mitsubishi Oil	14	3	2	9	14	25	−11	8

Source: RSSSF

=== Shikoku ===
Pos	Team	Pld	W	D	L	GF	GA	GD	Pts
1	Nangoku Club	14	10	2	2	49	24	+25	22
2	Otsuka Pharmaceutical	14	10	1	3	62	16	+46	21
3	Daio Paper	14	9	0	5	43	43	0	18
4	Imabari Club	14	7	2	5	36	30	+6	16
5	Yamabiko Club	14	6	1	7	30	39	−9	13
6	Showa Club	14	6	0	8	29	40	−11	12
7	Suzue Nisshindo	14	3	1	10	38	55	−17	7
8	Takamatsu Club	14	1	1	12	16	56	−40	3

Source: RSSSF

=== Kyushu ===
Pos	Team	Pld	W	D	L	GF	GA	GD	Pts
1	Nakatsu Club	7	4	1	2	22	10	+12	9
2	Nippon Steel Ōita	7	4	1	2	20	11	+9	9
3	Mitsubishi Chemical Kurosaki	7	3	2	2	15	12	+3	8
4	Miyanoh Club	7	3	2	2	7	9	−2	8
5	Saga Nanyo Club	7	3	0	4	16	20	−4	6
6	Kagoshima Teachers	7	3	0	4	11	15	−4	6
7	Miyazaki Teachers	7	2	1	4	13	17	−4	5
8	Kumamoto Teachers	7	1	3	3	10	20	−10	5

Source: RSSSF
