= 1979 Japanese Regional Leagues =

Japanese amateur leagues football season

Japanese Regional Leagues
- Season: 1979

These are the statistics of Japanese Regional Leagues for the 1979 season.

== Champions list ==
Region	Champions
Hokkaido	Nippon Steel Muroran
Tohoku	Nippon Steel Kamaishi
Kantō	Saitama Teachers
Hokushin'etsu	Nissei Plastic Industrial
Tōkai	Daikyo Oil
Kansai	Kyoto Shiko Club
Chūgoku	Mazda Auto Hiroshima
Shikoku	Otsuka Pharmaceutical
Kyushu	Nakatsu Club

== League standings ==
=== Hokkaido ===
Pos	Team	Pld	W	PKW	PKL	L	GF	GA	GD	Pts
1	Nippon Steel Muroran	5	4	1	0	0	19	5	+14	18
2	Sapporo	5	3	0	0	2	18	12	+6	12
3	Hakodate 76	5	2	0	2	1	10	11	−1	10
4	Hokushukai	5	1	1	1	2	10	13	−3	7
5	Hakodate Mazda	5	1	1	0	3	9	12	−3	6
6	Muroran Club	5	1	0	0	4	5	18	−13	4

Source: RSSSF

=== Tohoku ===
Pos	Team	Pld	W	D	L	GF	GA	GD	Pts
1	Nippon Steel Kamaishi	14	12	2	0	50	18	+32	26
2	Morioka Zebra	14	11	0	3	48	20	+28	22
3	Kureha	14	6	2	6	26	30	−4	14
4	Akita Toyota	14	4	5	5	16	23	−7	13
5	Matsushima	13	4	4	5	21	32	−11	12
6	Nitto Boseki Fukushima	14	4	3	7	26	30	−4	11
7	Towada Kickers	14	3	3	8	22	30	−8	9
8	Tohoku Oil	13	1	1	11	12	37	−25	3

Source: RSSSF

=== Kantō ===
Pos	Team	Pld	W	PKW	PKL	L	GF	GA	GD	Pts
1	Saitama Teachers	18	13	0	1	4	47	16	+31	53
2	Furukawa Chiba	18	12	1	1	4	50	25	+25	51
3	Yokogawa Electric	18	11	1	1	5	44	20	+24	47
4	Toho Titanium	18	9	2	1	6	34	25	+9	41
5	Metropolitan Police	18	8	1	0	9	21	36	−15	34
6	Ibaraki Hitachi	18	7	2	1	8	32	28	+4	33
7	Yamatake Honeywell	18	6	1	2	9	32	40	−8	28
8	Hitachi Mito Katsuta	18	4	3	4	7	19	21	−2	26
9	Kanagawa Teachers	18	3	2	3	10	28	48	−20	19
10	Kobe Steel	18	3	1	0	14	13	61	−48	14

Source: RSSSF

=== Hokushin'etsu ===
Pos	Team	Pld	W	D	L	GF	GA	GD	Pts
1	Nissei Plastic Industrial	9	9	0	0	30	1	+29	18
2	Yamaga	9	6	1	2	18	11	+7	13
3	Toyama Club	9	4	3	2	15	8	+7	11
4	YKK	9	4	2	3	21	15	+6	10
5	Fukui Bank	9	4	1	4	20	25	−5	9
6	Fukui Teachers	9	3	2	4	15	20	−5	8
7	Uozu Club	9	3	1	5	15	18	−3	7
8	Teihens	9	3	1	5	10	17	−7	7
9	Nagano Teachers	9	2	2	5	13	24	−11	6
10	Fuji Electric Matsumoto	9	0	1	8	4	22	−18	1

Source: RSSSF

=== Tōkai ===
Pos	Team	Pld	W	D	L	GF	GA	GD	Pts
1	Nagoya	13	11	1	1	49	17	+32	23
2	Daikyo Oil	13	8	3	2	28	13	+15	19
3	Minolta Camera	13	8	0	5	30	26	+4	16
4	Honda Hamayukai	13	6	2	5	24	21	+3	14
5	Sumitomo Bakelite	13	4	3	6	26	40	−14	11
6	Maruyasu	13	4	5	4	22	18	+4	13
7	Tomoegawa Papers	13	5	2	6	25	32	−7	12
8	Honda Suzuka	13	3	3	7	15	25	−10	9
9	Wakaayu Club	13	2	4	7	17	28	−11	8
10	Toyoda Automatic Loom Works	13	2	1	10	12	28	−16	5

Source: RSSSF

=== Kansai ===
Pos	Team	Pld	W	D	L	GF	GA	GD	Pts
1	Kyoto Shiko Club	18	12	5	1	50	23	+27	29
2	NTT Kinki	18	12	4	2	45	22	+23	28
3	Hyōgo Teachers	18	11	5	2	39	18	+21	27
4	Mitsubishi Motors Kyoto	18	10	4	4	43	24	+19	24
5	Mitsubishi Heavy Industries Kobe	18	7	5	6	31	28	+3	19
6	Dainichi Nippon Cable	18	7	3	8	25	21	+4	17
7	Nippon Steel Hirohata	18	4	3	11	28	39	−11	11
8	Yuasa Batteries	18	5	0	13	31	42	−11	10
9	Osaka Teachers	18	1	7	10	25	57	−32	9
10	Wakayama Club	18	2	2	14	17	60	−43	6

Source: RSSSF

=== Chūgoku ===
Pos	Team	Pld	W	D	L	GF	GA	GD	Pts
1	Mazda Auto Hiroshima	14	11	2	1	34	15	+19	24
2	Mitsubishi Oil	14	9	2	3	22	13	+9	20
3	Kawasaki Steel Mizushima	14	8	2	4	30	15	+15	18
4	Mitsui Shipbuilding	14	8	1	5	30	13	+17	17
5	Tanabe Pharmaceuticals	14	5	4	5	24	20	+4	14
6	Mitsubishi Motors Mizushima	14	4	2	8	20	22	−2	10
7	Hitachi Kasado	14	3	1	10	26	38	−12	7
8	Matsue Tomonokai	14	1	0	13	8	58	−50	2

Source: RSSSF

=== Shikoku ===
Pos	Team	Pld	W	D	L	GF	GA	GD	Pts
1	Otsuka Pharmaceutical	14	8	4	2	48	20	+28	20
2	Nangoku Club	14	9	2	3	34	22	+12	20
3	Showa Club	14	8	3	3	34	16	+18	19
4	Imabari Club	14	7	3	4	33	25	+8	17
5	Suzue Nisshindo	14	5	2	7	28	32	−4	12
6	Daio Paper	14	5	0	9	29	36	−7	10
7	Takamatsu Club	14	4	1	9	13	39	−26	9
8	Ogata Club	14	2	1	11	22	51	−29	5

Source: RSSSF

=== Kyushu ===
Pos	Team	Pld	W	D	L	GF	GA	GD	Pts
1	Nakatsu Club	7	5	1	1	14	6	+8	11
2	Saga Nanyo Club	7	3	3	1	13	9	+4	9
3	Kagoshima Teachers	7	3	2	2	14	10	+4	8
4	Miyazaki Teachers	7	3	2	2	13	11	+2	8
5	Kumamoto Teachers	7	4	0	3	11	13	−2	8
6	Nippon Steel Ōita	7	3	1	3	12	11	+1	7
7	Miyanoh Club	7	0	3	4	7	16	−9	3
8	Mitsubishi Chemical Kurosaki	7	0	2	5	7	15	−8	2

Source: RSSSF
