= 1986 Japanese Regional Leagues =

Japanese amateur leagues football season

Japanese Regional Leagues
- Season: 1986

Statistics of Japanese Regional Leagues for the 1986 season.

== Champions list ==
Region	Champions
Hokkaido	Sapporo
Tohoku	Matsushima
Kantō	Saitama Teachers
Hokushin'etsu	Niigata eleven
Tōkai	Jatco
Kansai	Osaka Teachers
Chūgoku	Mazda Auto Hiroshima
Shikoku	Teijin
Kyushu	Kagoshima Teachers

== League standings ==
=== Hokkaido ===
Pos	Team	Pld	W	D	L	GF	GA	GD	Pts	Qualification or relegation
1	Sapporo (Q)	9	7	1	1	19	6	+13	15	Qualified for the 1986 JSL Promotion Tournament
2	Sapporo Mazda	9	6	2	1	25	13	+12	14	
3	Sapporo University OB	9	5	1	3	22	13	+9	11	
4	Hakodate Mazda	9	5	0	4	21	19	+2	10	
5	Blackpecker Hakodate	9	4	1	4	13	20	−7	9	
6	Nippon Steel Muroran	9	4	0	5	14	18	−4	8	
7	Hokushu-kai	9	3	1	5	13	17	−4	7	
8	Japan Steel Muroran	9	3	1	5	12	18	−6	7	
9	Otaru Shuyukai	9	2	1	6	7	16	−9	5	
10	Nippon Oil Muroran (R)	9	2	0	7	11	17	−6	4	Relegated to Sapporo Block League

Source: RSSSF
(Q) Qualified for the phase indicated; (R) Relegated

=== Tohoku ===
Pos	Team	Pld	W	D	L	GF	GA	GD	Pts
1	Matsushima	12	9	2	1	34	10	+24	20
2	Morioka Zebra	12	9	0	3	49	17	+32	18
3	Akita City Government	12	7	2	3	36	14	+22	16
4	Ishinomaki City Government	12	6	3	3	19	19	0	15
5	Nitto Boseki Fukushima	12	3	1	8	18	37	−19	7
6	Akisho Club	12	2	0	10	12	30	−18	4
7	Kureha	12	2	0	10	10	51	−41	4

Source: RSSSF

=== Kantō ===
Pos	Team	Pld	W	D	L	GF	GA	GD	Pts
1	Saitama Teachers	18	11	7	0	43	20	+23	29
2	NTT Kanto	18	11	6	1	37	13	+24	28
3	Furukawa Chiba	18	11	3	4	37	24	+13	25
4	Tokyo Gas	18	9	4	5	32	26	+6	22
5	Chiba Teachers	18	7	4	7	36	28	+8	18
6	Kanagawa Teachers	18	4	5	9	31	39	−8	13
7	Ibaraki Hitachi	18	4	5	9	20	30	−10	13
8	Ibaraki Teachers	18	4	4	10	25	41	−16	12
9	Hitachi Mito Katsuta	18	3	5	10	16	35	−19	11
10	Tochigi Teachers	18	3	3	12	15	36	−21	9

Source: RSSSF

=== Hokushin'etsu ===
Pos	Team	Pld	W	D	L	GF	GA	GD	Pts
1	Niigata eleven	9	8	1	0	19	6	+13	17
2	Toyama Club	9	8	0	1	23	9	+14	16
3	YKK	9	6	0	3	14	11	+3	12
4	Yamaga	9	4	2	3	21	13	+8	10
5	Teihens	9	4	1	4	19	24	−5	9
6	Nissei Plastic Industrial	9	3	2	4	15	14	+1	8
7	Seiyū Club	9	3	1	5	12	15	−3	7
8	Fukui Teachers	9	2	1	6	11	18	−7	5
9	Komagane	9	1	2	6	13	22	−9	4
10	Fujitsu Nagano	9	0	2	7	9	24	−15	2

Source: RSSSF

=== Tokai ===
Pos	Team	Pld	W	D	L	GF	GA	GD	Pts
1	Jatco	16	12	4	0	51	16	+35	28
2	Toyoda Machine Works	16	9	5	2	46	29	+17	23
3	Fujieda City Government	16	7	4	5	32	29	+3	18
4	Maruyasu	16	8	1	7	31	24	+7	17
5	Shizuoka Gas	16	6	3	7	26	32	−6	15
6	Shimizu Club	16	6	1	9	25	36	−11	13
7	Nagoya	16	7	2	7	26	24	+2	16
8	Tomoegawa Papers	16	6	3	7	32	31	+1	15
9	Mitsui Du Pont Fluorochemicals	16	3	7	6	20	26	−6	13
10	Yamaha Club	16	6	1	9	18	31	−13	13
11	Honda Hamayukai	16	4	3	9	26	37	−11	11
12	Minolta Camera	16	3	4	9	17	35	−18	10

Source: RSSSF

=== Kansai ===
Pos	Team	Pld	W	D	L	GF	GA	GD	Pts
1	Osaka Teachers	18	12	5	1	40	10	+30	29
2	Kyoto Shiko Club	18	9	6	3	39	21	+18	24
3	Mitsubishi Motors Kyoto	18	9	6	3	22	18	+4	24
4	Dainichi Nippon Cable	18	10	3	5	31	20	+11	23
5	Hyōgo Teachers	18	6	6	6	26	23	+3	18
6	Matsushita Electron	18	5	5	8	26	36	−10	15
7	West Osaka	18	4	5	9	14	37	−23	13
8	Tanabe	18	3	6	9	20	32	−12	12
9	Hokusetsu	18	3	5	10	20	26	−6	11
10	Sanyo Electric Sumoto	18	3	5	10	23	38	−15	11

Source: RSSSF

=== Chūgoku ===
Pos	Team	Pld	W	D	L	GF	GA	GD	Pts
1	Mazda Auto Hiroshima	14	11	2	1	46	19	+27	24
2	Hiroshima Teachers	14	8	3	3	25	14	+11	19
3	Yamaguchi Teachers	14	7	3	4	34	24	+10	17
4	Mazda Toyo	14	6	3	5	24	22	+2	15
5	Mitsubishi Oil	14	4	3	7	13	21	−8	11
6	Yonago	14	4	3	7	25	36	−11	11
7	Mitsui Shipbuilding	14	3	3	8	14	32	−18	9
8	Tanabe Pharmaceuticals	14	2	2	10	15	28	−13	6

Source: RSSSF

=== Shikoku ===
Pos	Team	Pld	W	D	L	GF	GA	GD	Pts
1	Teijin	14	13	1	0	59	3	+56	27
2	NTT Shikoku	14	10	0	4	46	17	+29	20
3	Imabari Club	14	8	1	5	35	17	+18	17
4	Nangoku Club	14	8	0	6	32	28	+4	16
5	Daio Paper	14	5	1	8	28	44	−16	11
6	Aiyu Club	14	5	0	9	21	59	−38	10
7	Takasho OB Club	14	3	2	9	15	25	−10	8
8	Showa Club	14	1	1	12	11	54	−43	3

Source: RSSSF

=== Kyushu ===
Pos	Team	Pld	W	D	L	GF	GA	GD	Pts
1	Kagoshima Teachers	9	6	1	2	20	10	+10	13
2	Nakatsu Club	9	5	2	2	17	13	+4	12
3	Mitsubishi Chemical Kurosaki	9	5	1	3	22	14	+8	11
4	Saga Nanyo Club	9	4	3	2	15	10	+5	11
5	NTT Kumamoto	9	4	2	3	8	11	−3	10
6	Kumamoto Teachers	9	4	0	5	14	19	−5	8
7	Honda Lock	9	2	3	4	13	16	−3	7
8	Kyushu Matsushita Electric	9	2	3	4	7	11	−4	7
9	Mitsubishi Heavy Industries Nagasaki	9	2	3	4	7	13	−6	7
10	Nippon Steel Ōita	9	1	2	6	11	17	−6	4

Source: RSSSF
