= 1975 Japanese Regional Leagues =

Japanese amateur leagues football season

Japanese Regional Leagues
- Season: 1975

Statistics of Japanese Regional Leagues for the 1975 season.

== Champions list ==
Region	Champions
Kantō	Hitachi Mito
Hokushinetsu	YKK
Tōkai	Daikyo Oil
Kansai	Mitsubishi Heavy Industries Kobe
Chugoku	Hiroshima Fujita
Kyushu	Nakatsu Club

== League standings ==
=== Kantō ===
Pos	Team	Pld	W	D	L	GF	GA	GD	Pts
1	Hitachi Mito	14	8	4	2	19	10	+9	20
2	Furukawa Chiba	14	8	3	3	38	20	+18	19
3	Kodama Club	14	6	4	4	17	16	+1	16
4	Ibaraki Hitachi	14	5	5	4	22	18	+4	15
5	Urawa	14	4	5	5	23	24	−1	13
6	Saitama Teachers	14	5	1	8	27	30	−3	11
7	Metropolitan Police	14	3	3	8	13	26	−13	9
8	NTT Kanto	14	2	5	7	17	32	−15	9

Source: RSSSF

=== Hokushinetsu ===
Pos	Team	Pld	W	D	L	GF	GA	GD	Pts
1	YKK	8	5	3	0	20	6	+14	13
2	Fukui Teachers	8	5	2	1	21	10	+11	12
3	Fukui Bank	8	5	1	2	33	7	+26	11
4	Toyama Club	8	4	2	2	23	11	+12	10
5	Fuji Electric Matsumoto	8	3	2	3	12	12	0	8
6	Yamaga	8	3	1	4	14	13	+1	7
7	Niigata Teachers	8	2	1	5	12	40	−28	5
8	Niigata	8	2	0	6	6	21	−15	4
9	Nakamuratome	8	1	0	7	4	26	−22	2

Source: RSSSF

=== Tōkai ===
Pos	Team	Pld	W	D	L	GF	GA	GD	Pts
1	Daikyo Oil	12	11	0	1	39	7	+32	22
2	Nagoya	12	9	1	2	32	10	+22	19
3	Tomoegawa Papers	12	6	1	5	30	21	+9	13
4	Toyoda Automatic Loom Works	12	5	1	6	14	23	−9	11
5	Wakaayu Club	12	4	0	8	17	29	−12	8
6	Sumitomo Bakelite	11	4	2	5	15	24	−9	10
7	Toyoda Machine Works	11	3	3	5	14	23	−9	9
8	Gifu Teachers	11	4	0	7	21	31	−10	8
9	Marutomi Club	11	1	2	8	14	28	−14	4

Source: RSSSF

=== Kansai ===
Pos	Team	Pld	W	D	L	GF	GA	GD	Pts
1	Mitsubishi Heavy Industries Kobe	14	8	4	2	27	15	+12	20
2	Nippon Steel Hirohata	14	8	2	4	24	13	+11	18
3	Yanmar Club	14	6	5	3	24	13	+11	17
4	Wakayama Teachers	14	7	3	4	24	18	+6	17
5	Omi Club	14	4	5	5	19	25	−6	13
6	Mitsubishi Heavy Industries Kyoto	14	4	3	7	18	24	−6	11
7	Yuasa Batteries	14	4	2	8	16	28	−12	10
8	Nissha Printing	14	2	2	10	16	32	−16	6

Source: RSSSF

=== Chūgoku ===
Pos	Team	Pld	W	D	L	GF	GA	GD	Pts
1	Hiroshima Fujita	12	9	2	1	43	17	+26	20
2	Mitsui Shipbuilding	12	8	2	2	31	10	+21	18
3	Hiroshima Teachers	12	6	3	3	30	25	+5	15
4	Japan Steel	12	5	2	5	13	22	−9	12
5	Hitachi Kasado	12	3	3	6	19	18	+1	9
6	Mazda Auto Hiroshima	12	3	0	9	21	38	−17	6
7	Masuda Club	12	2	0	10	19	46	−27	4

Source: RSSSF

=== Kyushu ===
Pos	Team	Pld	W	D	L	GF	GA	GD	Pts
1	Nakatsu Club	7	7	0	0	26	10	+16	14
2	Kumamoto Teachers	7	4	2	1	22	15	+7	10
3	Saga Nanyo Club	7	4	1	2	16	18	−2	9
4	Kagoshima Teachers	7	4	0	3	18	14	+4	8
5	Mitsubishi Chemical Kurosaki	7	3	1	3	12	13	−1	7
6	Kagoshima Club	7	3	0	4	16	19	−3	6
7	Miyanoh Club	7	0	2	5	9	17	−8	2
8	Nishi-Nippon Railroad	7	0	1	6	9	22	−13	1

Source: RSSSF
