= 1981 Japanese Regional Leagues =

Japanese amateur leagues football season

Japanese Regional Leagues
- Season: 1981

Statistics of Japanese Regional Leagues for the 1981 season.

== Champions list ==
Region	Champions
Hokkaido	Sapporo Mazda
Tohoku	Nippon Steel Kamaishi
Kanto	Furukawa Chiba
Hokushinetsu	YKK
Tokai	Daikyo Oil
Kansai	NTT Kinki
Chūgoku	Kawasaki Steel Mizushima
Shikoku	Otsuka Pharmaceutical
Kyushu	Mitsubishi Chemical Kurosaki

== League standings ==
=== Hokkaido ===
Pos	Team	Pld	W	D	L	GF	GA	GD	Pts	Qualification or relegation
1	Sapporo Mazda (C, Q)	7	5	2	0	12	3	+9	12	Qualified for the 1981 Regional Champions League
2	Nippon Oil Muroran	7	3	3	1	6	5	+1	9	
3	Hakodate 76	7	3	2	2	21	11	+10	8	
4	Nippon Steel Muroran	7	2	4	1	15	12	+3	8	
4	Hakodate Mazda	7	3	2	2	15	12	+3	8	
6	Otaru Shuyukai	7	3	0	4	13	17	−4	6	
7	Hokushukai (O)	7	1	1	5	8	15	−7	3	Participated in the playoff match (vs 2nd place in the All-Province District Finals) and remained
8	Sapporo (R)	7	0	2	5	5	20	−15	2	Relegated to Sapporo Regional League

Source: RSSSF
(C) Champions; (O) Play-off winners; (Q) Qualified for the phase indicated; (R) Relegated

=== Tohoku ===
Pos	Team	Pld	W	D	L	GF	GA	GD	Pts
1	Nippon Steel Kamaishi	14	11	2	1	48	11	+37	24
2	Morioka Zebra	14	8	5	1	46	18	+28	21
3	Matsushima	14	7	3	4	34	21	+13	17
4	Akita Toyota	14	7	2	5	23	22	+1	16
5	Kureha	14	4	3	7	27	41	−14	11
6	Akisho Club	14	3	3	8	15	28	−13	9
7	Nitto Boseki Fukushima	14	3	2	9	16	29	−13	8
8	Towada Kickers	14	2	2	10	12	51	−39	6

Source: RSSSF

=== Kanto ===
Pos	Team	Pld	W	D	L	GF	GA	GD	Pts
1	Furukawa Chiba	18	11	4	3	38	19	+19	26
2	Saitama Teachers	18	10	5	3	30	17	+13	25
3	Toho Titanium	18	11	2	5	33	20	+13	24
4	Ibaraki Hitachi	18	8	5	5	24	16	+8	21
5	NTT Kanto	18	5	8	5	26	22	+4	18
6	Hitachi Mito Katsuta	18	7	3	8	25	23	+2	17
7	Ibaraki Teachers	18	6	5	7	28	33	−5	17
8	Chiba Teachers	18	4	4	10	17	31	−14	12
9	Hitachi Tochigi	18	4	4	10	11	28	−17	12
10	Metropolitan Police	18	1	6	11	11	34	−23	8

Source: RSSSF

=== Hokushinetsu ===
Pos	Team	Pld	W	D	L	GF	GA	GD	Pts
1	YKK	9	8	0	1	17	5	+12	16
2	Nissei Plastic Industrial	9	7	1	1	32	11	+21	15
3	Yamaga	9	5	1	3	15	9	+6	11
4	Toyama Club	9	5	0	4	23	12	+11	10
5	Fukui Bank	9	5	0	4	19	13	+6	10
6	Fukui Teachers	9	5	0	4	13	15	−2	10
7	Seiyū Club	9	4	0	5	11	15	−4	8
8	Uozu Club	9	2	0	7	11	26	−15	4
9	Ono Club	9	2	0	7	14	34	−20	4
10	Teihens	9	1	0	8	13	28	−15	2

Source: RSSSF

=== Tokai ===
Pos	Team	Pld	W	D	L	GF	GA	GD	Pts
1	Daikyo Oil	13	12	0	1	49	9	+40	24
2	Fujieda City Government	13	11	0	2	34	14	+20	22
3	Maruyasu	13	8	0	5	33	17	+16	16
4	Honda Hamayukai	13	6	1	6	21	26	−5	13
5	Honda Suzuka	13	4	1	8	15	39	−24	9
6	Shizuoka Gas	13	6	2	5	24	18	+6	14
7	Minolta Camera	13	5	2	6	27	25	+2	12
8	Tomoegawa Papers	13	6	0	7	30	31	−1	12
9	Sunday Club	13	2	0	11	22	49	−27	4
10	Wakaayu Club	13	1	2	10	18	45	−27	4

Source: RSSSF

=== Kansai ===
Pos	Team	Pld	W	D	L	GF	GA	GD	Pts
1	NTT Kinki	18	12	5	1	39	12	+27	29
2	Hyōgo Teachers	18	11	4	3	43	23	+20	26
3	Mitsubishi Heavy Industries Kobe	18	8	5	5	20	14	+6	21
4	Kyoto Shiko Club	18	8	4	6	23	23	0	20
5	Osaka Gas	18	8	3	7	38	29	+9	19
6	Kyoto Police	18	7	5	6	34	29	+5	19
7	Mitsubishi Motors Kyoto	18	4	9	5	19	24	−5	17
8	Osaka Teachers	18	5	3	10	21	32	−11	13
9	Dainichi Nippon Cable	18	3	2	13	20	38	−18	8
10	Yuasa Batteries	18	1	6	11	10	43	−33	8

Source: RSSSF

=== Chūgoku ===
Pos	Team	Pld	W	D	L	GF	GA	GD	Pts
1	Kawasaki Steel Mizushima	14	9	4	1	42	17	+25	22
2	Mitsubishi Oil	14	8	1	5	30	19	+11	17
3	Mazda Auto Hiroshima	14	6	3	5	18	19	−1	15
4	Masuda Club	14	7	1	6	24	33	−9	15
5	Mitsui Shipbuilding	14	6	2	6	22	24	−2	14
6	Tanabe Pharmaceuticals	14	4	5	5	18	20	−2	13
7	Yamaguchi Teachers	14	3	4	7	29	31	−2	10
8	Mitsubishi Motors Mizushima	14	1	4	9	8	28	−20	6

Source: RSSSF

=== Shikoku ===
Pos	Team	Pld	W	D	L	GF	GA	GD	Pts
1	Otsuka Pharmaceutical	14	10	3	1	38	15	+23	23
2	Imabari Club	14	9	1	4	36	22	+14	19
3	Showa Club	14	7	1	6	44	35	+9	15
4	Daio Paper	14	7	1	6	37	35	+2	15
5	Takasho OB Club	14	7	1	6	26	31	−5	15
6	Nangoku Club	14	6	2	6	32	31	+1	14
7	Aiyu Club	14	5	1	8	28	27	+1	11
8	Takamatsu Club	14	0	0	14	12	57	−45	0

Source: RSSSF

=== Kyushu ===
Pos	Team	Pld	W	D	L	GF	GA	GD	Pts
1	Mitsubishi Chemical Kurosaki	7	5	2	0	25	6	+19	12
2	Saga Nanyo Club	7	5	1	1	11	4	+7	11
3	Nakatsu Club	7	5	0	2	11	11	0	10
4	Kagoshima Teachers	7	4	0	3	21	13	+8	8
5	Kumamoto Teachers	7	3	0	4	11	14	−3	6
6	Kawasoe Club	7	2	1	4	12	16	−4	5
7	Nippon Steel Ōita	7	1	1	5	8	17	−9	3
8	Miyanoh Club	7	0	1	6	5	23	−18	1

Source: RSSSF
