= 1982 Japanese Regional Leagues =

Japanese amateur leagues football season

Japanese Regional Leagues
- Season: 1982
- Champions: Toho Titanium
- Promoted: Toho Titanium

Statistics of Japanese Regional Leagues for the 1982 season.

== Champions list ==
| Region | Champions |
|---|---|
| Hokkaido | Nippon Steel Muroran |
| Tohoku | TDK |
| Kantō | Toho Titanium |
| Hokushin'etsu | Nissei Plastic Industrial |
| Tōkai | Daikyo Oil |
| Kansai | Hyogo Teachers |
| Chūgoku | Kawasaki Steel Mizushima |
| Shikoku | Aiyu Club |
| Kyushu | Mitsubishi Chemical Kurosaki |

== Hokkaido ==
Hakodate FC 1976 changed name to Blackpecker Hakodate.

| Pos | Team | Pld | W | D | L | GF | GA | GD | Pts | Qualification or relegation |
|---|---|---|---|---|---|---|---|---|---|---|
| 1 | Nippon Steel Muroran | 7 | 5 | 2 | 0 | 21 | 7 | +14 | 12 | Qualified for the 6th JSL Promotion Tournament |
| 2 | Sapporo Mazda | 7 | 4 | 1 | 2 | 20 | 8 | +12 | 9 | |
| 3 | Blackpecker Hakodate | 7 | 4 | 1 | 2 | 12 | 9 | +3 | 9 | |
| 4 | Otaru Shuyukai | 7 | 3 | 2 | 2 | 17 | 16 | +1 | 8 | |
| 5 | Nippon Oil Muroran | 7 | 2 | 2 | 3 | 8 | 10 | −2 | 6 | |
| 6 | Hakodate Mazda | 7 | 1 | 4 | 2 | 10 | 14 | −4 | 6 | |
| 7 | Hokushukai | 7 | 2 | 1 | 4 | 10 | 15 | −5 | 5 | |
| 8 | Yotsuba | 7 | 0 | 1 | 6 | 4 | 23 | −19 | 1 | Relegated |

Source: RSSSF

=== Tohoku ===
| Pos | Team | Pld | W | D | L | GF | GA | GD | Pts | Qualification or relegation |
|---|---|---|---|---|---|---|---|---|---|---|
| 1 | TDK | 14 | 11 | 3 | 0 | 41 | 12 | +29 | 25 | Qualified for the 6th JSL Promotion Tournament |
| 2 | Matsushima | 14 | 9 | 2 | 3 | 45 | 22 | +23 | 20 | |
| 3 | Morioka Zebra | 14 | 9 | 2 | 3 | 38 | 19 | +19 | 20 | |
| 4 | Nippon Steel Kamaishi | 14 | 7 | 3 | 4 | 36 | 23 | +13 | 17 | |
| 5 | Nitto Boseki Fukushima | 14 | 4 | 1 | 9 | 22 | 36 | −14 | 9 | |
| 6 | Kureha | 14 | 3 | 2 | 9 | 15 | 41 | −26 | 8 | |
| 7 | Akisho Club | 14 | 2 | 3 | 9 | 16 | 32 | −16 | 7 | |
| 8 | Akita Toyota | 14 | 2 | 2 | 10 | 11 | 39 | −28 | 6 | Relegated |

Source: RSSSF

=== Kantō ===
| Pos | Team | Pld | W | D | L | GF | GA | GD | Pts | Qualification or relegation |
|---|---|---|---|---|---|---|---|---|---|---|
| 1 | Toho Titanium | 18 | 13 | 3 | 2 | 36 | 12 | +24 | 29 | Qualified for the 6th JSL Promotion Tournament |
| 2 | NTT Kanto | 18 | 10 | 4 | 4 | 32 | 20 | +12 | 24 | |
| 3 | Furukawa Chiba | 18 | 10 | 4 | 4 | 25 | 16 | +9 | 24 | |
| 4 | Yokohama Tristar | 18 | 11 | 1 | 6 | 32 | 21 | +11 | 23 | |
| 5 | Ibaraki Teachers | 18 | 9 | 4 | 5 | 25 | 22 | +3 | 22 | |
| 6 | Ibaraki Hitachi | 18 | 7 | 1 | 10 | 19 | 25 | −6 | 15 | |
| 7 | Hitachi Mito Katsuta | 18 | 4 | 5 | 9 | 13 | 17 | −4 | 13 | |
| 8 | Chiba Teachers | 18 | 3 | 5 | 10 | 17 | 29 | −12 | 11 | |
| 9 | Tochigi Teachers | 18 | 3 | 4 | 11 | 22 | 33 | −11 | 10 | |
| 10 | Hitachi Tochigi | 18 | 4 | 1 | 13 | 20 | 46 | −26 | 9 | Relegated |

Source: RSSSF

=== Hokushin'etsu ===
| Pos | Team | Pld | W | D | L | GF | GA | GD | Pts | Qualification |
|---|---|---|---|---|---|---|---|---|---|---|
| 1 | Nissei Plastic Industrial | 9 | 9 | 0 | 0 | 38 | 8 | +30 | 18 | Qualified for the 6th JSL Promotion Tournament |
| 2 | YKK | 9 | 6 | 1 | 2 | 27 | 11 | +16 | 13 | |
| 3 | Toyama Club | 9 | 6 | 0 | 3 | 19 | 9 | +10 | 12 | |
| 4 | Fukui Bank | 9 | 4 | 1 | 4 | 21 | 14 | +7 | 9 | |
| 5 | Yamaga | 9 | 4 | 1 | 4 | 11 | 10 | +1 | 9 | |
| 6 | Kanazawa | 9 | 3 | 3 | 3 | 15 | 21 | −6 | 9 | |
| 7 | Fukui Teachers | 9 | 3 | 1 | 5 | 13 | 19 | −6 | 7 | |
| 8 | Teihens | 9 | 2 | 3 | 4 | 12 | 28 | −16 | 7 | |
| 9 | Seiyū Club | 9 | 2 | 2 | 5 | 7 | 15 | −8 | 6 | |
| 10 | Uozu Club | 9 | 0 | 0 | 9 | 6 | 34 | −28 | 0 | |

Source: RSSSF

=== Tokai ===
| Pos | Team | Pld | W | D | L | GF | GA | GD | Pts | Qualification or relegation (Note: Teams played each other once (10 matches), before the league split into two groups (the top five (Championship Group) and the bottom six (Relegation Group)) for the last four/five matches.) |
|---|---|---|---|---|---|---|---|---|---|---|
| 1 | Daikyo Oil | 14 | 11 | 2 | 1 | 37 | 13 | +24 | 24 | Qualified for the 6th JSL Promotion Tournament |
| 2 | Seino Transportation | 14 | 12 | 0 | 2 | 34 | 14 | +20 | 24 | |
| 3 | Shizuoka Gas | 14 | 7 | 2 | 5 | 21 | 17 | +4 | 16 | |
| 4 | Fujieda City Government | 14 | 7 | 0 | 7 | 34 | 24 | +10 | 14 | |
| 5 | Nagoya | 14 | 6 | 1 | 7 | 29 | 24 | +5 | 13 | |
| 6 | Maruyasu | 15 | 9 | 1 | 5 | 36 | 27 | +9 | 19 | |
| 7 | Tomoegawa Papers | 15 | 5 | 4 | 6 | 27 | 28 | −1 | 14 | |
| 8 | Honda Hamayukai | 15 | 4 | 5 | 6 | 25 | 30 | −5 | 13 | |
| 9 | Minolta Camera | 15 | 4 | 3 | 8 | 18 | 35 | −17 | 11 | Relegated |
| 10 | Honda Suzuka | 15 | 1 | 5 | 9 | 16 | 39 | −23 | 7 | Relegated |
| 11 | Gifu Teachers | 15 | 2 | 1 | 12 | 22 | 48 | −26 | 5 | Relegated |

Source: RSSSF

=== Kansai ===
| Pos | Team | Pld | W | D | L | GF | GA | GD | Pts | Qualification or relegation |
|---|---|---|---|---|---|---|---|---|---|---|
| 1 | Hyogo Teachers | 18 | 11 | 4 | 3 | 34 | 18 | +16 | 26 | Qualified for the 6th JSL Promotion Tournament |
| 2 | Osaka Gas | 18 | 9 | 4 | 5 | 35 | 24 | +11 | 22 | |
| 3 | NTT Kinki | 18 | 8 | 5 | 5 | 33 | 21 | +12 | 21 | |
| 4 | Kyoto Shiko Club | 18 | 8 | 3 | 7 | 26 | 21 | +5 | 19 | |
| 5 | Mitsubishi Motors Kyoto | 18 | 8 | 3 | 7 | 25 | 24 | +1 | 19 | |
| 6 | Tanabe | 18 | 9 | 1 | 8 | 25 | 33 | −8 | 19 | |
| 7 | Kyoto Police | 18 | 6 | 6 | 6 | 23 | 20 | +3 | 18 | |
| 8 | Dainichi Nippon Cable | 18 | 5 | 6 | 7 | 19 | 28 | −9 | 16 | |
| 9 | Osaka Teachers | 18 | 4 | 6 | 8 | 29 | 41 | −12 | 14 | |
| 10 | Mitsubishi Heavy Industries Kobe | 18 | 2 | 2 | 14 | 11 | 30 | −19 | 6 | Relegated |

Source: RSSSF

=== Chūgoku ===
| Pos | Team | Pld | W | D | L | GF | GA | GD | Pts | Qualification or relegation |
|---|---|---|---|---|---|---|---|---|---|---|
| 1 | Kawasaki Steel Mizushima | 14 | 10 | 1 | 3 | 39 | 18 | +21 | 21 | Qualified for the 6th JSL Promotion Tournament |
| 2 | Yamaguchi Teachers | 14 | 8 | 3 | 3 | 34 | 21 | +13 | 19 | |
| 3 | Mitsubishi Oil | 14 | 5 | 6 | 3 | 21 | 21 | 0 | 16 | |
| 4 | Mazda Auto Hiroshima | 14 | 5 | 5 | 4 | 23 | 22 | +1 | 15 | |
| 5 | Tanabe Pharmaceuticals | 14 | 4 | 5 | 5 | 29 | 31 | −2 | 13 | |
| 6 | Hitachi Kasado | 14 | 3 | 4 | 7 | 26 | 36 | −10 | 10 | |
| 7 | Masuda Club | 14 | 4 | 1 | 9 | 23 | 32 | −9 | 9 | |
| 8 | Mitsui Shipbuilding | 14 | 4 | 1 | 9 | 25 | 39 | −14 | 9 | |

Source: RSSSF

=== Shikoku ===
| Pos | Team | Pld | W | D | L | GF | GA | GD | Pts | Qualification or relegation |
|---|---|---|---|---|---|---|---|---|---|---|
| 1 | Aiyu Club | 14 | 10 | 0 | 4 | 40 | 22 | +18 | 20 | Qualified for the 6th JSL Promotion Tournament |
| 2 | Showa Club | 14 | 9 | 0 | 5 | 48 | 30 | +18 | 18 | |
| 3 | Imabari Club | 14 | 6 | 4 | 4 | 30 | 29 | +1 | 16 | |
| 4 | Daio Paper | 14 | 5 | 4 | 5 | 31 | 32 | −1 | 14 | |
| 5 | Nangoku Club | 14 | 6 | 2 | 6 | 30 | 34 | −4 | 14 | |
| 6 | Otsuka Pharmaceuticals | 14 | 6 | 1 | 7 | 27 | 32 | −5 | 13 | |
| 7 | Takasho OB Club | 14 | 5 | 3 | 6 | 19 | 26 | −7 | 13 | |
| 8 | Taiho Pharmaceutical | 14 | 1 | 2 | 11 | 18 | 38 | −20 | 4 | |

Source: RSSSF

=== Kyushu ===
| Pos | Team | Pld | W | D | L | GF | GA | GD | Pts | Qualification or relegation |
|---|---|---|---|---|---|---|---|---|---|---|
| 1 | Mitsubishi Chemical Kurosaki | 9 | 5 | 2 | 2 | 24 | 10 | +14 | 12 | Qualified for the 6th JSL Promotion Tournament |
| 2 | Kagoshima Teachers | 9 | 5 | 2 | 2 | 22 | 11 | +11 | 12 | |
| 3 | Nakatsu Club | 9 | 5 | 2 | 2 | 23 | 13 | +10 | 12 | |
| 4 | Nippon Steel Oita | 9 | 4 | 3 | 2 | 23 | 10 | +13 | 11 | |
| 5 | Saga Nanyo Club | 9 | 5 | 1 | 3 | 18 | 10 | +8 | 11 | |
| 6 | Kumamoto Teachers | 9 | 5 | 1 | 3 | 20 | 17 | +3 | 11 | |
| 7 | Mitsubishi Heavy Industries Nagasaki | 9 | 4 | 1 | 4 | 21 | 20 | +1 | 9 | |
| 8 | Kyocera Sendai | 9 | 2 | 2 | 5 | 15 | 31 | −16 | 6 | |
| 9 | Kawasoe Club | 9 | 1 | 2 | 6 | 9 | 28 | −19 | 4 | |
| 10 | Miyanoh Club | 9 | 1 | 0 | 8 | 12 | 37 | −25 | 2 | Relegated |

Source: RSSSF
