= 1987 Japanese Regional Leagues =

Japanese amateur leagues football season

Japanese Regional Leagues
- Season: 1987

Statistics of Japanese Regional Leagues for the 1987 season.

== Champions list ==
Region	Champions
Hokkaido	Sapporo Mazda
Tohoku	Matsushima
Kanto	Saitama Teachers
Hokushin'etsu	Nissei Plastic Industrial
Tokai	Jatco
Kansai	Kyoto Police
Chūgoku	Mazda Toyo
Shikoku	Teijin
Kyushu	Mitsubishi Chemical Kurosaki

== League standings ==
=== Hokkaido ===
Pos	Team	Pld	W	D	L	GF	GA	GD	Pts
1	Sapporo Mazda	9	8	0	1	23	4	+19	16
2	Sapporo	9	4	3	2	14	8	+6	11
3	Blackpecker Hakodate	9	5	1	3	13	11	+2	11
4	Asahikawa Daisetsu Club	9	5	1	3	15	13	+2	11
5	Sapporo University OB	9	4	1	4	15	14	+1	9
6	Hokushukai	9	4	0	5	17	19	−2	8
7	Hakodate Mazda	9	2	3	4	10	19	−9	7
8	Otaru Shuyukai	9	2	2	5	9	14	−5	6
9	Japan Steel Muroran	9	3	0	6	9	21	−12	6
10	Nippon Steel Muroran	9	2	1	6	13	15	−2	5

Source: RSSSF

=== Tohoku ===
Pos	Team	Pld	W	D	L	GF	GA	GD	Pts
1	Matsushima	14	11	2	1	51	17	+34	24
2	Akita City Government	14	11	1	2	34	14	+20	23
3	TDK	14	10	2	2	51	15	+36	22
4	Morioka Zebra	14	6	0	8	31	31	0	12
5	Kureha	14	3	3	8	16	29	−13	9
6	Akisho Club	14	3	3	8	14	34	−20	9
7	Nitto Boseki Fukushima	14	3	2	9	15	47	−32	8
8	Ishinomaki City Government	14	2	1	11	14	39	−25	5

Source: RSSSF

=== Kantō ===
Pos	Team	Pld	W	D	L	GF	GA	GD	Pts
1	Saitama Teachers	18	11	5	2	38	20	+18	27
2	Chiba Teachers	18	9	5	4	34	20	+14	23
3	Kanagawa Teachers	18	9	5	4	33	24	+9	23
4	Ibaraki Hitachi	18	8	6	4	31	15	+16	22
5	Furukawa Chiba	18	8	6	4	33	21	+12	22
6	Tokyo Teachers	18	5	6	7	17	26	−9	16
7	Ibaraki Teachers	18	5	5	8	24	26	−2	15
8	Tokyo Gas	18	3	8	7	15	18	−3	14
9	Hitachi Mito Katsuta	18	2	7	9	10	28	−18	11
10	All Nippon Airways	18	3	1	14	16	53	−37	7

Source: RSSSF

=== Hokushin'etsu ===
Pos	Team	Pld	W	D	L	GF	GA	GD	Pts
1	Nissei Plastic Industrial	9	6	2	1	20	9	+11	14
2	Toyama Club	9	5	2	2	26	12	+14	12
3	Niigata eleven	9	3	4	2	15	12	+3	10
4	Yamaga	9	4	2	3	12	11	+1	10
5	Kanazawa	9	4	2	3	18	18	0	10
6	YKK	9	4	2	3	13	14	−1	10
7	Fukui Teachers	9	3	1	5	12	15	−3	7
8	Teihens	9	2	3	4	11	16	−5	7
9	Fujitsu Nagano	9	1	4	4	8	19	−11	6
10	Seiyū Club	9	2	0	7	9	18	−9	4

Source: RSSSF

=== Tōkai ===
Pos	Team	Pld	W	D	L	GF	GA	GD	Pts
1	Jatco	16	13	2	1	51	13	+38	28
2	Fujieda City Government	16	12	1	3	36	16	+20	25
3	Toyoda Machine Works	16	9	2	5	36	28	+8	20
4	Maruyasu	16	6	3	7	30	29	+1	15
5	Fuyo Club	16	6	3	7	36	41	−5	15
6	Yamakiya Club	16	5	3	8	22	41	−19	13
7	Yamaha Club	16	6	4	6	22	23	−1	16
8	Nagoya	16	4	5	7	20	25	−5	13
9	Shimizu Club	16	3	7	6	12	19	−7	13
10	Mitsui Du Pont Fluorochemicals	16	4	5	7	16	24	−8	13
11	Shizuoka Gas	16	3	6	7	17	27	−10	12
12	Tomoegawa Papers	16	3	3	10	13	25	−12	9

Source: RSSSF

=== Kansai ===
Pos	Team	Pld	W	D	L	GF	GA	GD	Pts
1	Kyoto Police	18	11	3	4	38	15	+23	25
2	Hyōgo Teachers	18	11	1	6	34	19	+15	23
3	Osaka Teachers	18	10	2	6	26	24	+2	22
4	West Osaka	18	8	5	5	25	19	+6	21
5	Kyoto Shiko Club	18	7	5	6	34	20	+14	19
6	Mitsubishi Motors Kyoto	18	6	6	6	25	22	+3	18
7	Osaka University of Commerce Club	18	8	2	8	31	36	−5	18
8	Mitsubishi Cable Industries	18	5	5	8	27	30	−3	15
9	Matsushita Electron	18	4	2	12	18	49	−31	10
10	Tanabe	18	3	3	12	17	41	−24	9

Source: RSSSF

=== Chūgoku ===
Pos	Team	Pld	W	D	L	GF	GA	GD	Pts
1	Mazda Toyo	12	8	4	0	34	8	+26	20
2	Hiroshima Teachers	12	7	4	1	26	13	+13	18
3	Yamaguchi Teachers	12	6	2	4	18	16	+2	14
4	Yonago	12	5	2	5	20	21	−1	12
5	Mitsubishi Oil	12	4	3	5	18	22	−4	11
6	Tottori Teachers	12	2	1	9	14	28	−14	5
7	Tanabe Pharmaceuticals	12	1	2	9	10	32	−22	4

Source: RSSSF

=== Shikoku ===
Pos	Team	Pld	W	D	L	GF	GA	GD	Pts
1	Teijin	14	14	0	0	67	8	+59	28
2	NTT Shikoku	14	12	0	2	53	13	+40	24
3	Nangoku Club	14	7	1	6	32	26	+6	15
4	Alex SC	14	6	1	7	26	47	−21	13
5	Matsuyama Club	14	5	1	8	31	39	−8	11
6	Imabari Club	14	3	3	8	18	30	−12	9
7	Daio Paper	14	3	2	9	26	49	−23	8
8	Takasho OB Club	14	1	2	11	12	53	−41	4

Source: RSSSF

=== Kyushu ===
Pos	Team	Pld	W	D	L	GF	GA	GD	Pts
1	Mitsubishi Chemical Kurosaki	9	5	4	0	30	10	+20	14
2	Nakatsu Club	9	5	2	2	13	19	−6	12
3	Kumamoto Teachers	9	4	3	2	15	9	+6	11
4	Saga Nanyo Club	9	5	1	3	12	12	0	11
5	Kyushu Matsushita Electric	9	3	4	2	10	11	−1	10
6	Tobiume Club	9	3	2	4	16	15	+1	8
7	Kagoshima Teachers	9	3	2	4	16	23	−7	8
8	NTT Kumamoto	9	2	3	4	15	15	0	7
9	Mitsubishi Heavy Industries Nagasaki	9	1	3	5	7	13	−6	5
10	Honda Lock	9	1	2	6	8	15	−7	4

Source: RSSSF
