= Giravanz Kitakyushu =

Japanese football club

Giravanz Kitakyushu ギラヴァンツ北九州
- Full name: Giravanz Kitakyushu
- Nicknames: Giravanz, Kita-Q
- Founded: 1947; 79 years ago
- Stadium: Mikuni World Stadium Kitakyushu; Kokurakita-ku, Kitakyushu, Fukuoka Prefecture
- Capacity: 15,300
- Chairman: Yukito Tamai
- Manager: Ryotaro Tanaka
- League: J3 League
- 2025: J3 League, 8th of 20
- Website: giravanz.jp
Home colours	Away colours

Giravanz Kitakyushu (ギラヴァンツ北九州, Giravantsu Kitakyūshū) is a Japanese football club based in Kitakyushu, Fukuoka Prefecture. They currently play in J3 League, Japanese third tier of professional league football.

== History ==
=== Mitsubishi Chemical SC (1947–2000) ===
The club was formed in 1947 as part of Mitsubishi Chemical's Kurosaki factory. The club was a founding member of Kyushu regional league since 1973. Most of its career was spent in the regional and prefectural leagues, as Kitakyushu was represented in the Japan Soccer League by Yahata Steel F.C. Yahata was a founding member of the JSL in 1965, and finished as runner-up in its first two seasons in that league. Yahata was renamed New Nippon Steel F.C. in 1970, when Yahata Steel merged with Fuji Steel to form (New) Nippon Steel. It ultimately was relegated to the Second Division in 1982, then relegated from the Second Division to Kyushu regional league after 1990–91 season, and closed in 1999.

=== New Wave Kitakyushu (2001–2009) ===
In 2001, the club became a community-oriented club (New Wave) Kitakyushu F.C.

In 2007 New Wave took second place in the Regional League promotion series, and was promoted to the JFL for the 2008 season.

The club applied for J. League Associate Membership in January 2008, and the application was accepted at the J. League board meeting on February 19, 2008.

On 1 April 2009, the club made an announcement that they would be accepting suggestions for a new name. This was because the name "New Wave" may cause trademark or tradename disputes. Therefore, the new name had to be something not yet registered as a trademark.

=== Giravanz Kitakyushu (2010–present) ===
On 2 October 2009, they announced that the new club name for the 2010 season would be Giravanz Kitakyushu (ギラヴァンツ北九州, Giravantsu Kitakyūshū). According to the official news release, the name "Giravanz" is coined from two Italian words: "Girasole", which means "sunflower", and "Avanzare", which means "moving forward". (The sunflower is one of Kitakyushu's symbol flowers.)

On 23 November 2009, after a 2–1 win away against Arte Takasaki, Kitakyushu secured a top four position in the JFL for the 2009 season. They played in J. League Division 2 from 2010-2016.

In its inaugural year in the pro ranks, despite attaining a large number of draw matches, Kitakyushu set new records for fewest wins and points in the season standings. After coming in last in the 2018 J3 League season, they named Shinji Kobayashi as the new manager and Sports Director. In 2019, Kobayashi led a turnaround; the club became league champions and were promoted to the 2020 J2 League. They finished 5th in 2020. At the end of the 2021 season, they were relegated to the J3 League, becoming the first J.League club relegated to the J3 League a second time. They finished 13th in 2022, and finished last in 2023. The 2023 season was the first J3 season to have relegation to the JFL, but Kitakyushu avoided it because both Honda FC and Briobecca Urayasu, the respective champions and runners-up of the JFL that season, did not have the necessary license for promotion. In 2024, Kitakyushu finished seventh, missing qualification to the playoffs by two points. The 2025 J3 season was the last season played on a calendar year format.

== Stadium ==
Giravanz played in the Honjo Athletic Stadium from 2010 until 2016.

Giravanz moved to the Mikuni World Stadium Kitakyushu, for the 2017 season.

== League and cup record ==
Champions	Runners-up	Third place	Promoted	Relegated

League														J. League Cup	Emperor's Cup
Season	Div.	Tier	Teams	Pos.	P	W (PKW)	D	L (PKL)	F	A	GD	Pts	Attendance/G	J. League Cup	Emperor's Cup
New Wave Kitakyushu
2003	Kyushu; Soccer; League	4	12	4th	22	12 (1)	-	5 (4)	65	46	19	42	-	Not eligible	–
2004	Kyushu; Soccer; League	4	10	6th	18	9 (0)	-	8 (1)	41	39	2	28	-	Not eligible	Did not qualify
2005	Kyushu; Soccer; League	4	10	6th	18	10 (0)	-	5 (3)	51	30	21	33	-	Not eligible	Did not qualify
2006	Kyushu; Soccer; League	4	9	3rd	16	11 (1)	-	3 (1)	45	23	22	36	-	Not eligible	Did not qualify
2007	Kyushu; Soccer; League	4	11	1st	20	17 (1)	-	1 (1)	53	7	46	54	-	Not eligible	Did not qualify
2008	JFL	3	18	10th	34	13	10	11	49	48	1	49	1,149	Not eligible	3rd round
2009	JFL	3	18	4th	34	16	10	8	49	31	18	58	3,411	Not eligible	1st round
Giravanz Kitakyushu
2010	J2	2	19	19th	36	1	12	28	20	65	-45	15	4,189	Not eligible	3rd round
2011	J2	2	20	8th	38	16	10	12	45	46	-1	58	4,051	Not eligible	3rd round
2012	J2	2	22	9th	42	19	7	16	53	47	6	64	3,346	Not eligible	2nd round
2013	J2	2	22	16th	42	13	10	19	50	60	-10	49	3,175	Not eligible	3rd round
2014	J2	2	22	5th	42	18	11	13	50	50	0	65	3,622	Not eligible	Quarter final
2015	J2	2	22	7th	42	18	5	19	59	58	1	59	3,488	Not eligible	2nd round
2016	J2	2	22	22nd	42	8	14	20	43	64	-21	38	3,224	Not eligible	2nd round
2017	J3	3	17	9th	32	13	7	12	44	37	7	46	5,939	Not eligible	2nd round
2018	J3	3	17	17th	32	6	9	17	22	42	-20	27	4,501	Not eligible	Did not qualify
2019	J3	3	18	1st	34	19	9	6	51	27	24	66	6,049	Not eligible	2nd round
2020 †	J2	2	22	5th	42	19	8	15	59	51	8	65	3,352	Not eligible	Did not qualify
2021 †	J2	2	22	21st	42	7	14	21	35	66	-31	35	2,974	Not eligible	2nd round
2022	J3	3	18	13th	34	11	7	16	41	45	-4	40	3,613	Not eligible	1st round
2023	J3	3	20	20th	38	7	10	21	33	45	-12	31	3,857	Not eligible	2nd round
2024	J3	3	20	7th	38	15	11	12	41	39	2	56	4,649	2nd round	2nd round
2025	J3	3	20	8th	38	17	5	16	46	41	5	56	5,563	2nd round	3rd round
2026	J3	3	40	40th	18	4	3	11	17	32	-15	15	5,712	N/A	N/A
2026-27	J3	3	20	TBD	38									TBD	TBD

Key

- Pos. = Position in league; P = Games played; W = Games won; D = Games drawn; L = Games lost; F = Goals scored; A = Goals conceded; GD = Goal Difference; Pts = Points gained
- Attendance/G = Average home league attendance.
- † 2020 & 2021 seasons attendances reduced by COVID-19 worldwide pandemic.
- Source: J. League Data Site.

== Honours ==
Giravanz Kitakyushu Honours
Honour	No.	Years
Kyushu Soccer League	8	1973, 1981, 1982, 1983, 1984, 1987, 1989, 2007
Fukuoka Prefectural Football Championship Emperor's Cup Fukuoka Prefectural Qualifiers	6	2017, 2019, 2022, 2023, 2024, 2025
J3 League	1	2019

== Players ==
=== Current squad ===
As of 1 August 2026.

Note: Flags indicate national team as defined under FIFA eligibility rules; some limited exceptions apply. Players may hold more than one non-FIFA nationality.

No.	Pos.	Nation	Player
1	GK	JPN	Go Ito
3	DF	JPN	Ryota Kamihashi (on loan from Kawasaki Frontale)
4	DF	JPN	Koki Hasegawa
5	DF	JPN	Takumi Narasaka (on loan from Machida Zelvia)
6	MF	JPN	Kota Hoshi
7	MF	JPN	Ryuki Hirahara
8	MF	JPN	Mahiro Yoshinaga
9	FW	JPN	Shuntaro Kawabe
10	FW	JPN	Ryo Nagai
11	FW	KOR	Koh Seung-jin
13	MF	JPN	Kazuki Kumasawa
14	MF	JPN	Haruki Izawa (captain)
15	FW	JPN	Mohamad Sadiki Wade (on loan from Kashiwa Reysol)
16	MF	JPN	Sota Maruyama
17	MF	JPN	Rimpei Okano
18	MF	JPN	Sho Hiramatsu

No.	Pos.	Nation	Player
19	FW	JPN	Futo Yoshihara
21	MF	JPN	Takanari Endo (on loan from Yokohama FC)
22	DF	JPN	Jin Ikoma (on loan from Iwaki FC)
25	FW	JPN	Raiki Tsubogo
28	DF	JPN	Kota Yokokubo (on loan from Tegevajaro Miyazaki)
30	DF	JPN	Kenta Fukumori
31	GK	JPN	Koki Otani
32	MF	JPN	Taku Ushinohama
37	FW	JPN	Kosei Yoshida
39	GK	JPN	Rissei Taniguchi
41	GK	JPN	Mitsuki Sugimoto (on loan from Júbilo Iwata)
42	DF	JPN	Tsukasa Sera
51	MF	JPN	Yutaro Sakashita
66	MF	JPN	Daigo Takahashi
77	MF	JPN	Ryuta Kanzawa
96	DF	JPN	Yuta Saitai

=== Out on loan ===
Note: Flags indicate national team as defined under FIFA eligibility rules; some limited exceptions apply. Players may hold more than one non-FIFA nationality.

No.	Pos.	Nation	Player
3	DF	JPN	Shinnosuke Ito (at Fukuyama City)
5	DF	JPN	Takeaki Hommura (at Tokyo 23 FC)
23	DF	JPN	Ryota Maeda (at Fukui United FC)
25	FW	JPN	Raiki Tsubogo (at Belugarosso Iwami)

== Coaching staff ==
Position	Name
Manager	(Japan) Kohei Masumoto
Assistant manager	(Japan) Norichika Kanemura
First-team coach	(Japan) Yusuke Sudo
Goalkeeper coach	(Japan) Shuto Yoshikawa
Physical coach	(Japan) Gakuya Tatsuta
Trainer	(Japan) Tatsuya Murakoshi (Japan) Shinichi Todake (Japan) Yuji Nakamura
Side managers	(Japan) Tetsuya Tsuda (Japan) Riku Namihira

== Managerial history ==
Manager	Nationality	Tenure	
Manager	Nationality	Start	Finish
Yoshinori Sembiki	Japan	1 February 2005	31 January 2007
George Yonashiro	Japan	1 February 2007	31 January 2011
Yasutoshi Miura	Japan	1 February 2011	31 January 2013
Kōichi Hashiratani	Japan	1 February 2013	31 January 2017
Takeo Harada	Japan	1 February 2017	31 January 2018
Hitoshi Morishita	Japan	1 February 2018	17 June 2018
Tetsuji Hashiratani	Japan	20 June 2018	31 January 2019
Shinji Kobayashi	Japan	1 February 2019	31 January 2022
Kenichi Amano	Japan	1 February 2022	31 January 2023
Kazuaki Tasaka	Japan	1 February 2023	5 September 2023
Shinji Kobayashi	Japan	6 September 2023	Current

== Colour, sponsors and manufacturers ==
Season(s)	Main Shirt Sponsor	Collarbone Sponsor		Additional Sponsor(s)				Kit Manufacturer
2020	TOTO	-	-	Yaskawa	-	Nafco	Zenrin	Penalty
2021	Yaskawa	WingArc1st		TOTO	Aso Group	Nafco	Zenrin	Penalty
2022	Yaskawa	WingArc1st	dejiren	TOTO	Aso Group	Nafco	Zenrin	Penalty
2023	Yaskawa	WingArc1st	dejiren	TOTO	Aso Group	Nafco	Zenrin	Penalty

=== Kit evolution ===
Home kit - 1st
2010 - 2012	2013	2014	2015	2016
2017	2018	2019	2020	2021
2022	2023	2024	2025	2026 -

Away kit - 2nd
2010 - 2012	2013	2014	2015	2016
2017	2018	2019	2020	2021
2022	2023	2024	2025	2026 -
