= Mitsubishi Cable Industries SC =

Japanese football club

Mitsubishi Cable Industries S.C.
- Full name: Mitsubishi Cable Industries Soccer Club
- Founded: 1969 (as Dainichi Nippon Cable SC)
- Dissolved: 2009
- Ground: Osaka, Japan
- League: Osaka Prefectural League

Mitsubishi Cable Industries Soccer Club was a Japanese football club based in Osaka. The club has played in Japan Soccer League Division 2. They last played in the Osaka Prefectural Leagues.

== Club name ==
- 1969–1987 : Dainichi Nippon Cable SC
- 1987–2009 : Mitsubishi Cable Industries SC
