= Ẽfini Hiroshima SC =

Ẽfini Hiroshima S.C.
- Full name: Ẽfini Hiroshima Soccer Club
- Founded: ? (as Mazda Auto Hiroshima SC)
- Dissolved: 1996
- Ground: Hiroshima, Japan

Ẽfini Hiroshima Soccer Club was a Japanese football club based in Hiroshima. The club has played in Japan Soccer League Division 2.

== Club name ==
- ?–1992 : Mazda Auto Hiroshima SC
- 1992–1996 : Ẽfini Hiroshima SC
