= 1992 Japanese Regional Leagues =

Japanese amateur leagues football season

Japanese Regional Leagues
- Season: 1992

Statistics of Japanese Regional Leagues for the 1992 season.

== Champions list ==
Region	Champions
Hokkaido	Hokuden
Tohoku	NEC Yamagata
Kantō	Honda Luminozo Sayama
Hokushin'etsu	YKK
Tōkai	PJM Futures
Kansai	NTT Kansai
Chūgoku	Mitsubishi Motors Mizushima
Shikoku	NTT Shikoku
Kyushu	Nippon Steel Yawata

== League standings ==
=== Hokkaido ===
Division 1
Pos	Team	Pld	W	D	L	GF	GA	GD	Pts
1	Hokuden	14	11	3	0	40	14	+26	36
2	Ẽfini Sapporo	14	10	2	2	39	11	+28	32
3	Nippon Steel Muroran	14	7	2	5	32	23	+9	23
4	Asahikawa Daisetsu Club	14	7	1	6	29	28	+1	22
5	Sapporo	14	6	3	5	20	26	−6	21
6	Hakodate Mazda	14	4	3	7	22	33	−11	15
7	Blackpecker Hakodate	14	1	4	9	14	32	−18	7
8	Sapporo University OB	14	1	0	13	12	41	−29	3

Source: RSSSF

Division 2
Pos	Team	Pld	W	D	L	GF	GA	GD	Pts
1	Japan Steel Works Muroran	7	6	0	1	20	11	+9	18
2	Sanyo Kokusaku Pulp	7	4	0	3	11	9	+2	12
3	Nippon Oil Muroran	7	3	2	2	10	10	0	11
4	Kyokushukai	7	3	2	2	9	10	−1	11
5	Asahikawa	7	3	0	4	8	9	−1	9
6	Muroran	7	1	4	2	13	13	0	7
7	Otaru Shuyukai	7	1	2	4	8	12	−4	5
8	Hakodate City Government	7	1	2	4	15	20	−5	5

Source: RSSSF

=== Tohoku ===
Pos	Team	Pld	W	D	L	GF	GA	GD	Pts
1	NEC Yamagata	14	11	2	1	39	2	+37	24
2	Tohoku Electric Power	14	8	3	3	29	17	+12	19
3	Matsushima	14	8	1	5	25	15	+10	17
4	Fukushima	14	6	4	4	26	18	+8	16
5	TDK	14	6	2	6	18	24	−6	14
6	Akita City Government	14	2	8	4	12	18	−6	12
7	Morioka Zebra	14	2	2	10	11	39	−28	6
8	Nakata Club	14	1	2	11	13	40	−27	4

Source: RSSSF
Rules for classification: 2 points for a win

=== Kantō ===
Pos	Team	Pld	W	D	L	GF	GA	GD	Pts
1	Honda Luminozo Sayama	18	13	3	2	36	16	+20	29
2	Chiba Teachers	18	10	4	4	34	15	+19	24
3	Saitama Teachers	18	8	3	7	27	28	−1	19
4	Kanagawa Teachers	18	7	4	7	28	24	+4	18
5	Ibaraki Hitachi	18	4	9	5	19	19	0	17
6	Asahi	18	8	1	9	29	32	−3	17
7	Sanyo Electric Tokyo	18	5	6	7	23	31	−8	16
8	Furukawa Chiba	18	6	3	9	18	27	−9	15
9	Nirasaki Astros	18	3	7	8	23	34	−11	13
10	Tochigi Teachers	18	4	4	10	27	38	−11	12

Source: RSSSF
Rules for classification: 2 points for a win

=== Hokushin'etsu ===
Pos	Team	Pld	W	D	L	GF	GA	GD	Pts
1	YKK	9	7	2	0	23	6	+17	16
2	Niigata eleven	9	6	2	1	13	6	+7	14
3	Kanazawa	9	5	2	2	16	6	+10	12
4	Nissei Plastic Industrial	9	5	2	2	15	10	+5	12
5	Yamaga	9	4	3	2	15	12	+3	11
6	Seiyū Club	9	3	2	4	6	13	−7	8
7	Toyama Club	9	2	3	4	7	9	−2	7
8	Teihens	9	2	2	5	9	14	−5	6
9	Fukui Teachers	9	2	0	7	8	18	−10	4
10	Fukui University of Technology	9	0	0	9	6	24	−18	0

Source: RSSSF
Rules for classification: 2 points for a win

=== Tōkai ===
Pos	Team	Pld	W	D	L	GF	GA	GD	Pts
1	PJM Futures	16	13	2	1	48	9	+39	28
2	Toyota Motors Higashi-Fuji	16	9	6	1	30	12	+18	24
3	Jatco	16	9	4	3	33	12	+21	22
4	Denso	16	9	4	3	36	22	+14	22
5	Fujieda City Government	16	6	2	8	19	24	−5	14
6	Toyota	16	4	3	9	13	29	−16	11
7	Toyoda Machine Works	16	5	6	5	22	27	−5	16
8	Minolta Camera	16	5	3	8	24	32	−8	13
9	Yamaha Club	16	5	2	9	22	32	−10	12
10	Maruyasu	16	4	3	9	19	27	−8	11
11	Nagoya	16	4	3	9	20	35	−15	11
12	Toyoda Automatic Loom Works	16	3	2	11	15	40	−25	8

Source: RSSSF
Rules for classification: 2 points for a win

=== Kansai ===
Pos	Team	Pld	W	D	L	GF	GA	GD	Pts
1	NTT Kansai	18	12	2	4	39	18	+21	38
2	Central Kobe	18	11	4	3	32	16	+16	37
3	Osaka University of Health and Sport sciences Club	18	10	2	6	32	21	+11	32
4	Sanyo Electric Sumoto	18	9	2	7	28	23	+5	29
5	Mitsubishi Motors Kyoto	18	7	5	6	20	17	+3	26
6	Ain Food	18	5	6	7	31	32	−1	21
7	Kyoto Police	18	4	6	8	21	30	−9	18
8	Mitsubishi Cable Industries	18	5	2	11	25	39	−14	17
9	Osaka Teachers	18	2	2	14	16	47	−31	8
10	Mitsubishi Heavy Industries Kobe	10	5	1	4	8	8	0	16
11	West Osaka	10	3	4	3	10	11	−1	13

Source: RSSSF

=== Chūgoku ===
Pos	Team	Pld	W	D	L	GF	GA	GD	Pts
1	Mitsubishi Motors Mizushima	14	11	2	1	36	14	+22	35
2	Ẽfini Hiroshima	14	8	2	4	44	27	+17	26
3	Mazda Toyo	14	7	2	5	27	23	+4	23
4	Hiroshima Fujita	14	7	0	7	26	24	+2	21
5	Tottori	14	4	4	6	22	38	−16	16
6	Yamaguchi Teachers	14	4	1	9	19	28	−9	13
7	Hiroshima Teachers	14	3	4	7	13	23	−10	13
8	NTN Okayama	14	3	3	8	14	24	−10	12

Source: RSSSF

=== Shikoku ===
Pos	Team	Pld	W	D	L	GF	GA	GD	Pts
1	NTT Shikoku	14	12	2	0	55	13	+42	26
2	Teijin	14	10	2	2	52	15	+37	22
3	Kagawa Shiun	14	8	2	4	49	16	+33	18
4	Nangoku Club	14	5	2	7	32	43	−11	12
5	Matsuyama Club	14	5	1	8	19	45	−26	11
6	Alex	14	5	0	9	30	46	−16	10
7	Shindo Club	14	3	1	10	20	44	−24	7
8	Otsuka Pharmaceuticals	14	3	0	11	22	57	−35	6

Source: RSSSF
Rules for classification: 2 points for a win

=== Kyushu ===
Pos	Team	Pld	W	D	L	GF	GA	GD	Pts
1	Nippon Steel Yawata	18	14	3	1	58	20	+38	45
2	NTT Kyushu	18	12	4	2	53	14	+39	40
3	Mitsubishi Chemical Kurosaki	18	10	5	3	42	28	+14	35
4	Kyocera Sendai	18	7	6	5	50	33	+17	27
5	Kumamoto Teachers	18	6	2	10	43	51	−8	20
6	Kawasoe Club	18	5	5	8	28	41	−13	20
7	Nippon Steel Oita	18	4	5	9	23	33	−10	17
8	Mitsubishi Heavy Industries Nagasaki	18	3	7	8	21	29	−8	16
9	Kagoshima Teachers	18	4	4	10	26	38	−12	16
10	Miyazaki Teachers	18	3	3	12	22	79	−57	12

Source: RSSSF
