= 1998 Japanese Regional Leagues =

Japanese amateur leagues football season

Japanese Regional Leagues
- Season: 1998
- Country: Japan

Statistics of Japanese Regional Leagues for the 1998 season.

== Champions list ==
Region	Champions
Hokkaido	Hokuden
Tohoku	NEC Tokin
Kanto	Yokogawa Electric
Hokushinetsu	ALO's Hokuriku
Tokai	Hitachi Shimizu
Kansai	Sagawa Express Osaka
Chugoku	Mazda
Shikoku	Ehime
Kyushu	Blaze Kumamoto

== League standings ==
=== Hokkaido ===
Division 1
Pos	Team	Pld	W	PKW	PKL	L	GF	GA	GD	Pts
1	Hokuden	7	6	1	0	0	25	1	+24	20
2	Nippon Steel Muroran	7	6	0	0	1	18	6	+12	18
3	Sapporo	7	4	1	0	2	21	11	+10	14
4	Obihiro	7	2	1	1	3	9	10	−1	9
5	Ẽfini Sapporo	7	2	0	1	4	8	13	−5	7
6	Blackpecker Hakodate	7	2	0	1	4	12	20	−8	7
7	Sapporo University OB	7	2	0	0	5	8	25	−17	6
8	Nippon Paper Tomakomai	7	1	0	0	6	6	21	−15	3

Source: RSSSF

Division 2
Pos	Team	Pld	W	PKW	PKL	L	GF	GA	GD	Pts
1	Vankei	7	5	1	1	0	26	7	+19	18
2	JSW Muroran	7	5	1	0	1	23	8	+15	17
3	Hakodate Mazda	7	5	0	0	2	22	14	+8	15
4	Sapporo First Club	7	3	1	1	2	22	18	+4	12
5	Asahikawa Daisetsu Club	7	2	1	2	2	14	14	0	10
6	Kyokushukai	7	2	0	1	4	15	23	−8	7
7	Nippon Oil Muroran	7	1	0	0	6	5	27	−22	3
8	Otaru Shuyukai	7	0	1	0	6	6	22	−16	2

Source: RSSSF

=== Tohoku ===
Division 1
Pos	Team	Pld	W	D	L	GF	GA	GD	Pts
1	NEC Tokin	14	9	2	3	29	17	+12	29
2	Morioka Zebra	14	8	3	3	38	21	+17	27
3	TDK	14	8	1	5	30	18	+12	25
4	Yamagata	14	7	2	5	25	18	+7	23
5	Matsushima	14	7	2	5	30	27	+3	23
6	Aster Aomori	14	5	2	7	24	25	−1	17
7	Akita City Government	14	4	3	7	34	40	−6	15
8	Tsuruoka TDK	14	0	1	13	11	55	−44	1

Source: RSSSF

Division 2 North
Pos	Team	Pld	W	D	L	GF	GA	GD	Pts
1	Nippon Steel Kamaishi	10	8	1	1	45	11	+34	25
2	Omiya	10	6	1	3	20	16	+4	19
3	Kosei	10	5	0	5	27	24	+3	15
4	Nishime Pana	10	4	1	5	17	24	−7	13
5	Akisho Club	10	3	1	6	12	24	−12	10
6	Towada Kickers	10	2	0	8	11	33	−22	6

Source: RSSSF

Division 2 South
Pos	Team	Pld	W	D	L	GF	GA	GD	Pts
1	Primeiro	10	10	0	0	53	6	+47	30
2	Furukawa Battery	10	6	0	4	31	21	+10	18
3	Electric Power Nostalgia	10	5	0	5	24	29	−5	15
4	NEC Yonezawa	10	4	1	5	20	25	−5	13
5	Kanai Club	10	3	0	7	8	33	−25	9
6	Shichigahama	10	1	1	8	13	35	−22	4

Source: RSSSF

=== Kanto ===
Pos	Team	Pld	W	D	L	GF	GA	GD	Pts	Promotion
1	Yokogawa Electric	18	15	1	2	49	12	+37	46	Promoted to new Japan Football League
2	Honda Luminozo Sayama	18	11	4	3	42	20	+22	37	
3	Ome	18	8	3	7	22	33	−11	27	
4	Kuyo	18	8	2	8	37	42	−5	26	
5	Nirasaki Astros	18	7	4	7	35	39	−4	25	
6	Kanagawa Teachers	18	6	3	9	26	25	+1	21	
7	Ibaraki Teachers	18	6	3	9	30	38	−8	21	
8	Aries Tokyo	18	5	4	9	26	28	−2	19	
9	Saitama Teachers	18	5	3	10	18	35	−17	18	
10	Jaeri Tokai	18	3	5	10	23	36	−13	14	

Source: RSSSF

=== Hokushinetsu ===
Pos	Team	Pld	W	OTW	PKW	L	GF	GA	GD	Pts
1	ALO's Hokuriku	8	6	2	0	0	26	7	+19	22
2	YKK	8	7	0	0	1	37	8	+29	21
3	Yamaga	8	4	0	0	4	17	24	−7	12
4	Niigatashuyukai	8	3	1	0	4	13	10	+3	11
5	Teihens	8	3	0	0	5	18	16	+2	9
6	Ueda Gentian	8	2	1	1	4	17	24	−7	9
7	Nissei Plastic Industrial	8	2	0	1	5	13	17	−4	7
8	Nagano Elsa	8	1	1	1	5	12	28	−16	6
9	Fukui Teachers	8	0	0	0	8	7	26	−19	0

Source: RSSSF

=== Tokai ===
Pos	Team	Pld	W	D	L	GF	GA	GD	Pts
1	Hitachi Shimizu	15	10	4	1	49	17	+32	24
2	Chūō Bōhan	15	10	3	2	42	17	+25	23
3	Yazaki Valente	15	10	1	4	43	29	+14	21
4	Nagoya Bank	15	9	2	4	46	29	+17	20
5	Fujieda City Government	15	8	3	4	33	24	+9	19
6	Nagoya	15	7	4	4	28	23	+5	18
7	Maruyasu	15	7	3	5	30	23	+7	17
8	Yamaha Motors	15	5	4	6	27	27	0	14
9	Matsushita Electric Iga	15	5	4	6	22	26	−4	14
10	Toyoda Automatic Loom Works	15	6	2	7	22	31	−9	14
11	Minolta	15	5	3	7	23	32	−9	13
12	Toyoda Machine Works	15	5	2	8	14	22	−8	12
13	Toyota	15	5	2	8	22	32	−10	12
14	Mind House	15	3	3	9	28	39	−11	9
15	Kawasaki Heavy Industries Gifu	15	4	1	10	18	34	−16	9
16	Tomoegawa Papers	15	0	1	14	16	58	−42	1

Source: RSSSF
Rules for classification: 2 points for a win; 1 point for a draw; 0 points for a loss.

=== Kansai ===
Pos	Team	Pld	W	D	L	GF	GA	GD	Pts
1	Sagawa Express Osaka	18	16	2	0	60	9	+51	50
2	Kyoken	18	15	2	1	63	13	+50	47
3	NTT Kansai	18	7	6	5	37	31	+6	27
4	Osaka Gas	18	8	2	8	28	28	0	26
5	West Osaka	18	7	3	8	27	24	+3	24
6	Kobe 1970	18	7	1	10	30	43	−13	22
7	Kyoto Shiko Club	18	6	3	9	32	52	−20	21
8	Sanyo Electric Sumoto	18	5	3	10	25	40	−15	18
9	Central Kobe	18	4	3	11	27	40	−13	15
10	Tanabe Pharmaceuticals	18	1	3	14	14	63	−49	6

Source: RSSSF

=== Chugoku ===
Pos	Team	Pld	W	PKW	PKL	L	GF	GA	GD	Pts
1	Mazda	14	11	2	0	1	65	14	+51	37
2	Hiroshima Fujita	14	9	1	2	2	50	21	+29	31
3	Mitsubishi Motors Mizushima	14	9	0	1	4	38	18	+20	28
4	Hiroshima Teachers	14	7	1	1	5	34	34	0	24
5	Mitsubishi Oil	14	5	1	0	8	23	36	−13	17
6	NKK Fukuyama	14	3	2	1	8	20	45	−25	14
7	Yamako	14	3	0	1	10	26	53	−27	10
8	Tottori	14	1	1	2	10	14	49	−35	7

Source: RSSSF

=== Shikoku ===
Pos	Team	Pld	W	D	L	GF	GA	GD	Pts
1	Ehime	14	9	3	2	35	17	+18	30
2	Himawari Milk Nangoku Club	14	7	2	5	30	23	+7	23
3	Kagawa Shiun	14	6	4	4	21	17	+4	22
4	Teijin	14	6	2	6	25	18	+7	20
5	Prima Meat Packers	14	6	2	6	22	21	+1	20
6	NTT Shikoku	14	6	2	6	24	27	−3	20
7	Sanyo Electric Tokushima	14	6	0	8	27	30	−3	18
8	Otsuka Pharmaceuticals	14	2	1	11	14	45	−31	7

Source: RSSSF

=== Kyushu ===
Pos	Team	Pld	W	PKW	PKL	L	GF	GA	GD	Pts
1	Blaze Kumamoto	18	13	2	2	1	48	19	+29	45
2	Volca Kagoshima	18	9	3	1	5	48	35	+13	34
3	Nippon Steel Yawata	18	9	3	1	5	31	32	−1	34
4	NTT Kyushu	18	8	2	2	6	35	25	+10	30
5	Nippon Steel Oita	18	8	1	2	7	40	30	+10	28
6	Kyocera Sendai	18	7	0	4	7	46	46	0	25
7	Mitsubishi Chemical Kurosaki	18	5	4	0	9	35	44	−9	23
8	Honda Lock	18	6	0	3	9	34	37	−3	21
9	Mitsubishi Heavy Industries Nagasaki	18	3	3	2	10	23	52	−29	17
10	Kumamoto Teachers	18	3	1	2	12	27	47	−20	13

Source: RSSSF
