= 1997 Japanese Regional Leagues =

Japanese amateur leagues football season

Japanese Regional Leagues
- Season: 1997
- Country: Japan

Statistics of Japanese Regional Leagues for the 1997 season.

== Champions list ==
Region	Champions
Hokkaido	Hokuden
Tohoku	Sony Sendai
Kanto	Yokogawa Electric
Hokushinetsu	Albirex Niigata
Tokai	Hitachi Shimizu
Kansai	Kyoken
Chugoku	Mazda
Shikoku	Kagawa Shiun
Kyushu	NTT Kyushu

== League standings ==
=== Hokkaido ===
Division 1
Pos	Team	Pld	W	PKW	PKL	L	GF	GA	GD	Pts
1	Hokuden	14	14	0	0	0	89	7	+82	42
2	Sapporo University OB	14	9	0	0	5	47	24	+23	27
3	Ẽfini Sapporo	14	9	0	0	5	28	22	+6	27
4	Sapporo	14	9	0	0	5	38	32	+6	27
5	Blackpecker Hakodate	14	4	0	2	8	22	46	−24	14
6	Nippon Steel Muroran	14	3	2	0	9	27	34	−7	13
7	Nippon Paper Tomakomai	14	3	1	0	10	23	46	−23	11
8	Asahikawa Daisetsu Club	14	2	0	1	11	19	82	−63	7

Source: RSSSF

Division 2
Pos	Team	Pld	W	PKW	PKL	L	GF	GA	GD	Pts
1	Obihiro	7	5	1	1	0	27	15	+12	18
2	Sapporo First Club	7	4	1	0	2	25	19	+6	14
3	JSW Muroran	7	3	2	0	2	17	15	+2	13
4	Kyokushukai	7	3	0	0	4	20	17	+3	9
5	Otaru Shuyukai	7	3	0	0	4	14	16	−2	9
6	Nippon Oil Muroran	7	3	0	0	4	10	22	−12	9
7	Hakodate Mazda	7	2	0	1	4	18	19	−1	7
8	BIG 1	7	1	0	2	4	13	21	−8	5

Source: RSSSF

=== Tohoku ===
Division 1
Pos	Team	Pld	W	D	L	GF	GA	GD	Pts
1	Sony Sendai	14	13	0	1	57	13	+44	39
2	Morioka Zebra	14	5	5	4	30	19	+11	20
3	TDK	14	6	2	6	28	27	+1	20
4	Yamagata	14	5	4	5	27	21	+6	19
5	Matsushima	14	5	4	5	32	27	+5	19
6	NEC Tokin	14	5	4	5	27	25	+2	19
7	Akita City Government	14	5	4	5	25	24	+1	19
8	Tsuruoka TDK	14	0	1	13	7	77	−70	1

Source: RSSSF

Division 2 North
Pos	Team	Pld	W	D	L	GF	GA	GD	Pts
1	Aster Aomori	10	8	2	0	36	5	+31	26
2	Nippon Steel Kamaishi	10	8	0	2	35	14	+21	24
3	Omiya	10	5	2	3	18	14	+4	17
4	Nishime Pana	10	2	2	6	12	22	−10	8
5	Akisho Club	10	2	2	6	6	25	−19	8
6	Towada Kickers	10	1	0	9	9	36	−27	3

Source: RSSSF

Division 2 South
Pos	Team	Pld	W	D	L	GF	GA	GD	Pts
1	Furukawa Battery	10	7	1	2	42	14	+28	22
2	Shichigahama	10	6	0	4	21	21	0	18
3	Sendai Nakada Club	10	5	1	4	34	30	+4	16
4	Matsushita Audio Fukushima	10	5	1	4	30	26	+4	16
5	NEC Yonezawa	10	2	2	6	13	23	−10	8
6	Kanai Club	10	2	1	7	20	46	−26	7

Source: RSSSF

=== Kanto ===
Pos	Team	Pld	W	D	L	GF	GA	GD	Pts
1	Yokogawa Electric	18	14	4	0	37	8	+29	46
2	Honda Luminozo Sayama	18	11	3	4	30	11	+19	36
3	Aries Tokyo	18	9	4	5	35	24	+11	31
4	Kuyo	18	9	1	8	39	32	+7	28
5	Ome	18	5	7	6	26	29	−3	22
6	Saitama Teachers	18	6	4	8	24	31	−7	22
7	Kanagawa Teachers	18	3	10	5	25	27	−2	19
8	Jaeri Tokai	18	5	4	9	18	32	−14	19
9	Toho Titanium	18	4	5	9	20	28	−8	17
10	PNC Tokai	18	2	2	14	14	46	−32	8

Source: RSSSF

=== Hokushin'etsu ===
Pos	Team	Pld	W	D	L	GF	GA	GD	Pts
1	Albirex Niigata	9	9	0	0	37	4	+33	27
2	ALO's Hokuriku	9	7	1	1	35	5	+30	22
3	YKK	9	6	1	2	26	5	+21	19
4	Nagano Elsa	9	4	0	5	13	21	−8	12
5	Teihens	9	3	2	4	14	16	−2	11
6	Ueda Gentian	9	3	1	5	15	19	−4	10
7	Fukui Teachers	9	1	4	4	11	21	−10	7
8	Yamaga	9	2	1	6	11	23	−12	7
9	Renaiss College	9	2	1	6	13	31	−18	7
10	Macky	9	2	1	6	9	39	−30	7

Source: RSSSF

=== Tokai ===
Pos	Team	Pld	W	D	L	GF	GA	GD	Pts
1	Hitachi Shimizu	15	12	2	1	47	13	+34	26
2	Fujieda City Government	15	11	3	1	35	13	+22	25
3	Toyota	15	10	3	2	36	21	+15	23
4	Maruyasu	15	9	4	2	34	18	+16	22
5	Yazaki Valente	15	9	1	5	34	23	+11	19
6	Nagoya	15	8	2	5	31	22	+9	18
7	Yamaha Motors	15	6	3	6	41	35	+6	15
8	Chuo Bohan	15	6	3	6	18	20	−2	15
9	Nagoya Bank	15	5	4	6	22	32	−10	14
10	Minolta	15	5	3	7	23	23	0	13
11	Kawasaki Heavy Industries Gifu	15	4	4	7	18	32	−14	12
12	Toyoda Machine Works	15	5	1	9	21	31	−10	11
13	Mind House	15	4	3	8	19	32	−13	11
14	Toyoda Automatic Loom Works	15	2	4	9	21	30	−9	8
15	Gifu Teachers	15	2	2	11	16	37	−21	6
16	Fujitsu Numazu	15	0	2	13	12	46	−34	2

Source: RSSSF
Rules for classification: 2 points for a win; 1 point for a draw; 0 points for a loss.

=== Kansai ===
Pos	Team	Pld	W	D	L	GF	GA	GD	Pts
1	Kyoken	18	14	3	1	46	15	+31	45
2	Sagawa Express Osaka	18	13	2	3	39	10	+29	41
3	Osaka Gas	18	10	3	5	29	25	+4	33
4	NTT Kansai	18	10	2	6	38	20	+18	32
5	Central Kobe	18	6	1	11	28	33	−5	19
6	Sanyo Electric Sumoto	18	5	4	9	22	32	−10	19
7	Tanabe Pharmaceuticals	18	5	3	10	22	39	−17	18
8	West Osaka	18	5	3	10	16	39	−23	18
9	Renaiss College	18	5	2	11	26	37	−11	17
10	Mitsubishi Motors Kyoto	18	4	3	11	15	31	−16	15

Source: RSSSF

=== Chugoku ===
Pos	Team	Pld	W	PKW	PKL	L	GF	GA	GD	Pts
1	Mazda	14	11	1	0	2	48	16	+32	35
2	Mitsubishi Oil	14	7	2	1	4	23	22	+1	26
3	Hiroshima Fujita	14	7	0	2	5	31	33	−2	23
4	Mitsubishi Motors Mizushima	14	6	2	0	6	31	28	+3	22
5	Yamako	14	5	2	2	5	27	23	+4	21
6	Hiroshima Teachers	14	4	3	2	5	23	30	−7	20
7	NKK Fukuyama	14	2	2	4	6	18	32	−14	14
8	Yamaguchi Teachers	14	1	1	2	10	14	31	−17	7

Source: RSSSF

=== Shikoku ===
Pos	Team	Pld	W	D	L	GF	GA	GD	Pts
1	Kagawa Shiun	14	9	3	2	47	24	+23	30
2	Teijin	14	9	3	2	32	13	+19	30
3	Otsuka Pharmaceuticals	14	8	3	3	42	24	+18	27
4	Ehime	14	7	3	4	23	23	0	24
5	Himawari Milk Nangoku Club	14	3	5	6	24	35	−11	14
6	Prima Meat Packers	14	3	3	8	22	33	−11	12
7	NTT Shikoku	14	1	6	7	18	32	−14	9
8	Kuroshio	14	2	2	10	9	33	−24	8

Source: RSSSF

=== Kyushu ===
Pos	Team	Pld	W	PKW	PKL	L	GF	GA	GD	Pts
1	NTT Kyushu	18	13	1	3	1	60	12	+48	44
2	Volca Kagoshima	18	12	1	3	2	50	19	+31	41
3	Blaze Kumamoto	18	10	5	1	2	40	18	+22	41
4	Nippon Steel Yawata	18	8	3	1	6	32	31	+1	31
5	Honda Lock	18	5	3	5	5	32	31	+1	26
6	Mitsubishi Chemical Kurosaki	18	6	2	2	8	30	36	−6	24
7	Kyocera Sendai	18	4	3	4	7	36	39	−3	22
8	Kumamoto Teachers	18	5	3	0	10	24	36	−12	21
9	Mitsubishi Heavy Industries Nagasaki	18	4	2	1	11	27	56	−29	17
10	Kyushu Mitsubishi Motors	18	0	0	3	15	13	66	−53	3

Source: RSSSF
