= 1995 Japanese Regional Leagues =

Japanese amateur leagues football season

Japanese Regional Leagues
- Season: 1995

Statistics of Japanese Regional Leagues for the 1995 season.

== Champions list ==
Region	Champions
Hokkaido	Hokuden
Tohoku	Sony Sendai
Kantō	Prima Meat Packers
Hokushin'etsu	YKK
Tōkai	Denso
Kansai	NTT Kansai
Chūgoku	Hiroshima Fujita
Shikoku	Teijin
Kyushu	Oita Trinity

== League standings ==
=== Hokkaido ===
Division 1
Pos	Team	Pld	W	PKW	PKL	L	GF	GA	GD	Pts
1	Hokuden	14	14	0	0	0	74	7	+67	42
2	Sapporo	14	10	1	1	2	49	17	+32	33
3	Nippon Steel Muroran	14	6	2	3	3	36	30	+6	25
4	Asahikawa Daisetsu Club	14	5	2	0	7	26	38	−12	19
5	Sapporo First Club	14	4	3	0	7	30	35	−5	18
6	Nippon Paper Tomakomai	14	3	0	4	7	20	44	−24	13
7	Ẽfini Sapporo	14	3	0	1	10	19	49	−30	10
8	JSW Muroran	14	2	1	0	11	21	55	−34	8

Source: RSSSF
Rules for classification: 3 points for a win; 0 points for a loss; drawn matches are decided by penalty shoot-out; winner obtains 2 pts, loser – 1 pt.

Division 2
Pos	Team	Pld	W	PKW	PKL	L	GF	GA	GD	Pts
1	Sapporo University OB	7	7	0	0	0	27	7	+20	21
2	Blackpecker Hakodate	7	6	0	0	1	22	8	+14	18
3	Hakodate Mazda	7	4	0	0	3	17	14	+3	12
4	Otaru Shuyukai	7	3	1	0	3	14	22	−8	11
5	BIG 1	7	3	0	0	4	18	12	+6	9
6	Nippon Oil Muroran	7	2	0	1	4	8	15	−7	7
7	Kyokushukai	7	1	0	0	6	9	19	−10	3
8	Shiroishi Club	7	1	0	0	6	8	26	−18	3

Source: RSSSF
Rules for classification: 3 points for a win; 0 points for a loss; drawn matches are decided by penalty shoot-out; winner obtains 2 pts, loser – 1 pt.

=== Tohoku ===
Pos	Team	Pld	W	D	L	GF	GA	GD	Pts
1	Sony Sendai	14	10	2	2	29	18	+11	22
2	Morioka Zebra	14	6	5	3	19	10	+9	17
3	Akita City Government	14	6	3	5	25	22	+3	15
4	Matsushima	14	6	2	6	26	19	+7	14
5	TDK	14	4	5	5	20	23	−3	13
6	Yamagata	14	6	1	7	22	26	−4	13
7	NEC Tokin	14	5	2	7	15	25	−10	12
8	Nakada Club	14	2	2	10	15	28	−13	6

Source: RSSSF
Rules for classification: 2 points for a win; 1 point for a draw; 0 points for a loss.

=== Kantō ===
Pos	Team	Pld	W	D	L	GF	GA	GD	Pts
1	Prima Meat Packers	18	14	3	1	48	13	+35	45
2	Yokogawa Electric	18	9	4	5	31	21	+10	31
3	Honda Luminozo Sayama	18	9	2	7	37	27	+10	29
4	Saitama Teachers	18	7	5	6	29	24	+5	26
5	Aries Tokyo	18	7	5	6	18	24	−6	26
6	Kanagawa Teachers	18	6	3	9	18	28	−10	21
7	Ibaraki Hitachi	18	4	8	6	19	22	−3	20
8	Toho Titanium	18	5	5	8	20	29	−9	20
9	Tokyo Marine Fire Insurance	18	4	4	10	10	26	−16	16
10	Furukawa Chiba	18	4	3	11	14	30	−16	15

Source: RSSSF
Rules for classification: 3 points for a win; 1 point for a draw; 0 points for a loss.

=== Hokushinetsu ===
Pos	Team	Pld	W	D	L	GF	GA	GD	Pts
1	YKK	9	8	0	1	31	7	+24	24
2	Hokuriku Electric Power	9	8	0	1	29	7	+22	24
3	Niigata eleven	9	7	1	1	19	6	+13	22
4	Fukui Teachers	9	6	1	2	18	16	+2	19
5	Teihens	9	5	0	4	18	17	+1	15
6	Yamaga	9	2	2	5	8	14	−6	8
7	Renaiss College	9	1	3	5	13	20	−7	6
8	Macky	9	1	2	6	11	23	−12	5
9	Kanazawa	9	1	1	7	9	26	−17	4
10	Seiyū Club	9	1	0	8	11	31	−20	3

Source: RSSSF
Rules for classification: 3 points for a win; 1 point for a draw; 0 points for a loss.

=== Tokai ===
Pos	Team	Pld	W	D	L	GF	GA	GD	Pts
1	Denso	19	16	3	0	65	16	+49	35
2	Hitachi Shimizu	19	17	0	2	49	9	+40	34
3	Jatco	19	11	1	7	46	33	+13	23
4	Maruyasu	19	8	4	7	33	29	+4	20
5	Fujieda City Government	19	7	3	9	21	28	−7	17
6	Yazaki Valente	19	6	3	10	38	48	−10	15
7	Nagoya Bank	19	7	1	11	39	53	−14	15
8	Yamaha Motors	19	7	5	7	33	37	−4	19
9	Toyota	19	8	2	9	21	17	+4	18
10	Nagoya	19	5	8	6	21	21	0	18
11	Fujitsu Numazu	19	7	4	8	32	36	−4	18
12	Toyoda Automatic Loom Works	19	4	5	10	23	35	−12	13
13	Minolta	19	5	3	11	28	45	−17	13
14	Kawasaki Heavy Industries Gifu	19	4	0	15	21	63	−42	8

Source: RSSSF
Rules for classification: 2 points for a win; 1 point for a draw; 0 points for a loss.

=== Kansai ===
Pos	Team	Pld	W	D	L	GF	GA	GD	Pts
1	NTT Kansai	9	6	2	1	18	4	+14	20
2	Osaka University of Health and Sport sciences Club	9	6	1	2	24	9	+15	19
3	Sanyo Electric Sumoto	9	5	3	1	15	7	+8	18
4	Central Kobe	9	5	2	2	14	10	+4	17
5	Osaka Gas	9	5	0	4	18	16	+2	15
6	Tanabe Pharmaceuticals	9	3	2	4	12	10	+2	11
7	Kyoto Police	9	3	1	5	13	17	−4	10
8	West Osaka	9	3	0	6	14	20	−6	9
9	Nissha Printing	9	2	1	6	9	27	−18	7
10	Matsushita Electron	9	1	0	8	3	20	−17	3

Source: RSSSF
Rules for classification: 3 points for a win; 1 point for a draw; 0 points for a loss.

=== Chugoku ===
Pos	Team	Pld	W	D	L	GF	GA	GD	Pts
1	Hiroshima Fujita	14	8	5	1	29	14	+15	29
2	Mitsubishi Motors Mizushima	14	7	6	1	30	14	+16	27
3	Mazda Toyo	14	6	3	5	24	23	+1	21
4	Yamako	14	6	1	7	23	27	−4	19
5	Mitsubishi Oil	14	4	5	5	18	22	−4	17
6	Ẽfini Hiroshima	14	5	2	7	28	41	−13	17
7	NTN Okayama	14	3	3	8	25	32	−7	12
8	Yamaguchi Teachers	14	2	5	7	26	30	−4	11

Source: RSSSF
Rules for classification: 3 points for a win; 1 point for a draw; 0 points for a loss.

=== Shikoku ===
Pos	Team	Pld	W	D	L	GF	GA	GD	Pts
1	Teijin	14	11	2	1	38	11	+27	35
2	Kagawa Shiun	14	9	3	2	42	17	+25	30
3	Ehime	14	7	2	5	30	23	+7	23
4	NTT Shikoku	14	6	1	7	26	36	−10	19
5	Otsuka Pharmaceuticals	14	4	5	5	26	26	0	17
6	Himawari Milk Nangoku Club	14	4	3	7	24	32	−8	15
7	Prima Meat Packers	14	4	2	8	18	30	−12	14
8	Kuroshio	14	1	2	11	15	44	−29	5

Source: RSSSF
Rules for classification: 3 points for a win; 1 point for a draw; 0 points for a loss.

=== Kyushu ===
Pos	Team	Pld	W	PKW	PKL	L	GF	GA	GD	Pts
1	Oita Trinity	18	15	1	0	2	74	11	+63	47
2	Blaze Kumamoto	18	12	1	2	3	46	16	+30	40
3	Nippon Steel Yawata	18	11	1	4	2	37	19	+18	39
4	NTT Kyushu	18	9	1	1	7	34	22	+12	30
5	Kagoshima Teachers	18	9	1	1	7	40	37	+3	30
6	Fukuoka Dreams	18	6	2	0	10	25	38	−13	22
7	Kumamoto Teachers	18	3	4	1	10	20	40	−20	18
8	Mitsubishi Chemical Kurosaki	18	4	1	2	11	18	42	−24	16
9	Mitsubishi Heavy Industries Nagasaki	18	3	2	2	11	25	53	−28	15
10	Nippon Steel Oita	18	4	0	1	13	15	56	−41	13

Source: RSSSF
Rules for classification: 3 points for a win; 0 points for a loss; drawn matches are decided by penalty shoot-out; winner obtains 2 pts, loser – 1 pt.
