= 1999 Japanese Regional Leagues =

Japanese amateur leagues football season

Japanese Regional Leagues
- Season: 1999
- Country: Japan

Statistics of Japanese Regional Leagues for the 1999 season.

== Champions list ==
Region	Champions
Hokkaido	Hokuden
Tohoku	NEC Tokin
Kanto	Tochigi
Hokushinetsu	YKK
Tokai	Hitachi Shimizu
Kansai	Kyoken
Chugoku	Mitsubishi Motors Mizushima
Shikoku	Ehime
Kyushu	NTT Kyushu

== League standings ==
=== Hokkaido ===
Division 1
Pos	Team	Pld	W	PKW	PKL	L	GF	GA	GD	Pts
1	Hokuden	10	9	1	0	0	42	8	+34	29
2	Sapporo	10	5	1	2	2	30	17	+13	19
3	Obihiro	10	5	1	0	4	28	25	+3	17
4	Blackpecker Hakodate	10	5	0	1	4	21	21	0	16
5	Nippon Steel Muroran	10	2	0	0	8	19	36	−17	6
6	Vankei	10	1	0	0	9	7	40	−33	3

Source: RSSSF

Division 2
Pos	Team	Pld	W	PKW	PKL	L	GF	GA	GD	Pts
1	Nippon Paper Yufutsu	7	5	1	0	1	23	10	+13	17
2	Chitose Bombers	7	4	0	1	2	28	16	+12	13
3	Sapporo University OB	7	3	1	0	3	22	14	+8	11
4	Hakodate Mazda	7	3	1	0	3	15	15	0	11
5	JSW Muroran	7	3	0	2	2	15	15	0	11
6	Sapporo Daiichi Club	7	2	1	0	4	16	24	−8	8
7	Asahikawa Daisetsu Club	7	2	0	1	4	13	23	−10	7
8	Kyokushukai	7	2	0	0	5	17	32	−15	6

Source: RSSSF

=== Tohoku ===
Division 1
Pos	Team	Pld	W	D	L	GF	GA	GD	Pts
1	NEC Tokin	14	9	1	4	22	11	+11	28
2	TDK	14	7	5	2	35	13	+22	26
3	Aster Aomori	14	7	3	4	27	19	+8	24
4	Morioka Zebra	14	7	2	5	27	21	+6	23
5	Yamagata	14	6	2	6	21	21	0	20
6	Primeiro	14	5	3	6	30	24	+6	18
7	Akita City Government	14	3	3	8	16	41	−25	12
8	Matsushima	14	1	3	10	18	46	−28	6

Source: RSSSF

Division 2 North
Pos	Team	Pld	W	D	L	GF	GA	GD	Pts
1	Nippon Steel Kamaishi	10	10	0	0	49	9	+40	30
2	Kosei	10	5	2	3	21	21	0	17
3	Omiya	10	4	3	3	20	21	−1	15
4	Akisho Club	10	3	3	4	21	20	+1	12
5	Nishime Pana	10	2	2	6	10	33	−23	8
6	Towada Kickers	10	0	2	8	11	28	−17	2

Source: RSSSF

Division 2 South
Pos	Team	Pld	W	D	L	GF	GA	GD	Pts
1	Shichigahama	10	9	0	1	36	11	+25	27
2	Furukawa Battery	10	8	1	1	36	10	+26	25
3	Matsushita Electric Fukushima	10	5	0	5	17	25	−8	15
4	Tsuruoka TDK	10	3	1	6	11	15	−4	10
5	Electric Power Nostalgia	10	2	0	8	11	26	−15	6
6	NEC Yonezawa	10	2	0	8	11	35	−24	6

Source: RSSSF

=== Kanto ===
Pos	Team	Pld	W	D	L	GF	GA	GD	Pts
1	Tochigi	18	8	7	3	37	16	+21	31
2	Honda Luminozo Sayama	18	9	4	5	34	18	+16	31
3	Kuyo	18	8	4	6	32	30	+2	28
4	Aries Tokyo	18	6	8	4	27	13	+14	26
5	Ome	18	7	5	6	30	24	+6	26
6	Kanagawa Teachers	18	7	3	8	34	32	+2	24
7	Saitama Teachers	18	6	6	6	22	22	0	24
8	Nirasaki Astros	18	7	3	8	30	40	−10	24
9	Ibaraki Teachers	18	6	3	9	19	30	−11	21
10	Yaita	18	3	3	12	19	59	−40	12

Source: RSSSF

=== Hokushin'etsu ===
Pos	Team	Pld	W	OTW	PKW	L	GF	GA	GD	Pts
1	YKK (C)	9	7	1	1	0	35	7	+28	24
2	ALO's Hokuriku	9	7	0	1	1	31	7	+24	22
3	Ueda Gentian	9	6	0	0	3	18	22	−4	18
4	Nissei Plastic Industrial	9	5	1	0	3	24	16	+8	17
5	Teihens	9	5	0	0	4	9	11	−2	15
6	Fukui Teachers	9	3	0	0	6	14	20	−6	9
7	Niigata Shuyukai	9	1	2	0	6	15	21	−6	7
8	Renaiss College Kanazawa	9	1	0	1	7	16	25	−9	4
9	Yamaga	9	1	0	1	7	4	29	−25	4
10	Nagano Elsa	9	1	0	0	8	19	27	−8	3

Source: RSSSF
(C) Champion

=== Tokai ===
Pos	Team	Pld	W	D	L	GF	GA	GD	Pts
1	Hitachi Shimizu	15	14	1	0	59	20	+39	43
2	Nagoya Bank	15	11	1	3	54	27	+27	34
3	Yazaki Valente	15	9	2	4	48	33	+15	29
4	Fujieda City Government	15	9	2	4	44	30	+14	29
5	Nagoya	15	8	2	5	50	32	+18	26
6	Minolta	15	7	2	6	29	25	+4	23
7	Maruyasu	15	6	3	6	19	20	−1	21
8	Chuo Bohan	15	5	3	7	17	23	−6	18
9	Toyoda Automatic Loom Works	15	4	5	6	25	26	−1	17
10	Toyota	15	3	6	6	15	27	−12	15
11	Shizuoka Subaru	15	3	6	6	20	35	−15	15
12	Yamaha Motors	15	2	8	5	23	35	−12	14
13	Toyoda Machine Works	15	3	5	7	19	33	−14	14
14	Matsushita Electric Iga	15	3	3	9	19	33	−14	12
15	Mind House	15	2	5	8	14	30	−16	11
16	Mach Yokkaishi	15	3	2	10	16	42	−26	11

Source: RSSSF

=== Kansai ===
Pos	Team	Pld	W	D	L	GF	GA	GD	Pts
1	Kyoken	5	4	1	0	10	0	+10	13
2	Sagawa Express Osaka	5	3	1	1	11	4	+7	10
3	Sanyo Electric Sumoto	5	3	0	2	13	14	−1	9
4	NTT West Japan Kyoto	5	1	1	3	9	12	−3	4
5	Kobe 1970	5	0	3	2	3	7	−4	3
6	Takada	5	1	0	4	8	17	−9	3
7	West Osaka	5	4	1	0	17	8	+9	13
8	Osaka Gas	5	4	1	0	10	3	+7	13
9	Kyoto Shiko Club	5	2	1	2	6	9	−3	7
10	Central Kobe	5	1	2	2	11	7	+4	5
11	Kumiyama	5	1	0	4	5	13	−8	3
12	Tanabe Pharmaceuticals	5	0	1	4	6	15	−9	1

Source: RSSSF

=== Chugoku ===
Pos	Team	Pld	W	PKW	PKL	L	GF	GA	GD	Pts
1	Mitsubishi Motors Mizushima	14	11	0	2	1	38	18	+20	35
2	Hiroshima Fujita	14	11	0	1	2	41	12	+29	34
3	Mazda	14	10	1	0	3	61	19	+42	32
4	Hiroshima Teachers	14	7	0	1	6	28	29	−1	22
5	Nippon Mitsubishi Oil	14	4	1	1	8	22	29	−7	15
6	Tottori	14	4	1	0	9	19	39	−20	14
7	NKK Fukuyama	14	2	3	0	9	17	38	−21	12
8	Yamako	14	1	0	1	12	14	56	−42	4

Source: RSSSF

=== Shikoku ===
Pos	Team	Pld	W	D	L	GF	GA	GD	Pts
1	Ehime	14	10	3	1	47	16	+31	33
2	Kagawa Shiun	14	9	1	4	41	25	+16	28
3	Nangoku Kochi	14	7	6	1	38	20	+18	27
4	Teijin	14	7	4	3	22	19	+3	25
5	Prima Meat Packers	14	5	4	5	38	30	+8	19
6	NTT Shikoku	14	5	2	7	24	27	−3	17
7	Sanyo Electric Tokushima	14	2	1	11	20	46	−26	7
8	Showa Club	14	0	1	13	17	64	−47	1

Source: RSSSF

=== Kyushu ===
Pos	Team	Pld	W	PKW	PKL	L	GF	GA	GD	Pts
1	NTT Kyushu	18	12	1	2	3	52	17	+35	40
2	Nippon Steel Oita	18	12	0	2	4	45	24	+21	38
3	Blaze Kumamoto	18	12	0	1	5	43	23	+20	37
4	Honda Lock	18	9	2	1	6	47	37	+10	32
5	Nippon Steel Yawata	18	8	2	1	7	32	38	−6	29
6	Volca Kagoshima	18	7	1	0	10	48	44	+4	23
7	Mitsubishi Heavy Industries Nagasaki	18	6	1	1	10	34	40	−6	21
8	Kyocera Sendai	18	6	1	1	10	39	52	−13	21
9	Mitsubishi Chemical Kurosaki	18	4	1	1	12	25	48	−23	15
10	Nakatsu Club	18	4	1	0	13	22	64	−42	14

Source: RSSSF
