= 2005 Japanese Regional Leagues =

Japanese amateur leagues football season

Japanese Regional Leagues
- Season: 2005

Statistics of Japanese Regional Leagues for the 2005 season.

== Champions list ==
Region	Champions
Hokkaido	Norbritz Hokkaido
Tohoku	TDK; Grulla Morioka
Kanto	Honda Luminozo Sayama
Hokushinetsu	Nagano Elsa
Tokai	Shizuoka
Kansai	Banditonce Kobe
Chugoku	Sagawa Express Chugoku
Shikoku	Nangoku Kochi
Kyushu	Rosso Kumamoto

== League standings ==
=== Hokkaido ===
Pos	Team	Pld	W	D	L	GF	GA	GD	Pts
1	Norbritz Hokkaido	14	12	1	1	37	13	+24	37
2	Blackpecker Hakodate	14	12	0	2	48	18	+30	36
3	ACSC	14	7	2	5	32	21	+11	23
4	Barefoot Hokkaido	14	7	0	7	34	26	+8	21
5	Sapporo	14	4	3	7	21	32	−11	15
6	Thank Kuriyama	14	4	2	8	16	27	−11	14
7	Toyota Motors Hokkaido	14	3	2	9	19	32	−13	11
8	R. Superb Kushiro	14	2	0	12	20	58	−38	6

=== Tohoku ===
Division 1
Pos	Team	Pld	W	D	L	GF	GA	GD	Pts
1	TDK	12	9	2	1	36	10	+26	29
1	Grulla Morioka	12	9	2	1	36	10	+26	29
3	Primeiro	12	5	2	5	19	22	−3	17
4	Shiogama Wiese	12	3	5	4	22	18	+4	14
5	NEC Tokin	12	3	2	7	13	28	−15	11
6	Nippon Steel Kamaishi	12	3	1	8	10	29	−19	10
7	Morioka Zebra	12	1	4	7	10	29	−19	7

Source: http://www.soccergen.info/JLeague/J361RgnLeague2.aspx?YEAR=2005&LEAGUE=820

Division 2 North
Pos	Team	Pld	W	D	L	GF	GA	GD	Pts
1	Tono Club	10	8	1	1	33	14	+19	25
2	Akita Cambiare	10	7	2	1	40	16	+24	23
3	Mizusawa Club	10	4	1	5	26	27	−1	13
4	Aster Aomori	10	4	1	5	23	24	−1	13
5	Hokuto Bank SC	10	2	1	7	21	38	−17	7
6	Sanno Club	10	1	2	7	16	40	−24	5

Division 2 South
Pos	Team	Pld	W	D	L	GF	GA	GD	Pts
1	Sendai Nakada Club	10	8	1	1	45	14	+31	25
2	Furukawa Battery	10	6	1	3	29	13	+16	19
3	Northern Peaks Koriyama	10	6	1	3	36	25	+11	19
4	Marysol Matsushima	10	4	0	6	43	29	+14	12
5	Kureha	10	1	3	6	21	42	−21	6
6	Yamagata	10	2	0	8	14	65	−51	6

=== Kanto ===
Division 1
Pos	Team	Pld	W	D	L	GF	GA	GD	Pts
1	Honda Luminozo Sayama	14	9	3	2	35	16	+19	30
2	JEF United Ichihara Amateur	14	9	1	4	41	16	+25	28
3	Saitama	14	9	0	5	30	28	+2	27
4	Maritime Self Defence Forces Atsugi Base Marcus	14	6	2	6	19	24	−5	20
5	Toho Titanium	14	4	3	7	18	29	−11	15
6	Yokohama Sports and Culture Club	14	4	2	8	21	30	−9	14
7	Yaita	14	3	3	8	22	32	−10	12
8	Aries Tokyo	14	2	6	6	14	25	−11	12

Division 2
Pos	Team	Pld	W	D	L	GF	GA	GD	Pts
1	Hanno Bruder	14	9	1	4	30	17	+13	28
2	Toshiba Fuchu	14	9	1	4	29	20	+9	28
3	Hitachi Tochigi	14	7	4	3	28	18	+10	25
4	Nirasaki Astros	14	8	1	5	29	24	+5	25
5	Kanagawa Teachers	14	7	0	7	27	30	−3	21
6	Ome	14	5	1	8	28	31	−3	16
7	Furukawa Chiba	14	3	1	10	13	26	−13	10
8	Kuyo	14	3	1	10	16	34	−18	10

=== Hokushinetsu ===
Division 1
Pos	Team	Pld	W	D	L	GF	GA	GD	Pts
1	Nagano Elsa	14	12	0	2	38	13	+25	36
2	Japan Soccer College	14	11	0	3	42	16	+26	33
3	Kanazawa	14	10	2	2	26	15	+11	32
4	Fervorosa Ishikawa Hakuzan	14	6	0	8	26	30	−4	18
5	Teihens	14	5	1	8	22	30	−8	16
6	Ueda Gentian	14	4	2	8	16	30	−14	14
7	Niigata University of Management	14	3	2	9	22	29	−7	11
8	Antelope Shiojiri	14	1	1	12	13	42	−29	4

Division 2
Pos	Team	Pld	W	D	L	GF	GA	GD	Pts
1	Matsumoto Yamaga	13	8	3	2	36	11	+25	27
2	Toyama Shinjo Club	13	7	3	3	20	14	+6	24
3	Valiente Toyama	13	7	0	6	26	18	+8	21
4	TOP Niigata	13	6	3	4	13	11	+2	21
5	Nissei Plastic Industrial	13	6	2	5	27	24	+3	20
6	Kanazu	13	7	3	3	25	15	+10	24
7	Giocatore Takaoka	13	7	0	6	27	21	+6	21
8	Fukui	13	3	3	7	20	26	−6	12
9	Billboard	13	3	2	8	20	34	−14	11
10	PFU	13	1	1	11	4	44	−40	4

=== Tokai ===
Division 1
Pos	Team	Pld	W	D	L	GF	GA	GD	Pts
1	Shizuoka	14	10	4	0	46	11	+35	34
2	Chukyo University	14	10	3	1	39	14	+25	33
3	Yazaki Valente	14	6	2	6	28	24	+4	20
4	Fujieda City Government	14	5	4	5	27	22	+5	19
5	Maruyasu	14	5	3	6	25	23	+2	18
6	Chuo Bohan	14	4	3	7	13	29	−16	15
7	Honda Suzuka	14	3	2	9	18	35	−17	11
8	Nagoya	14	2	1	11	8	46	−38	7

Division 2
Pos	Team	Pld	W	D	L	GF	GA	GD	Pts
1	Sagawa Express Chukyo	14	9	3	2	29	21	+8	30
2	Gifu	14	8	5	1	26	7	+19	29
3	Fuyo Club	14	9	2	3	35	17	+18	29
4	Konica Minolta Toyokawa	14	4	6	4	19	21	−2	18
5	Mind House T.C.	14	4	4	6	21	22	−1	16
6	Kasugai Club	14	3	4	7	21	17	+4	13
7	Nagoya West F.C.	14	3	3	8	12	28	−16	12
8	Toyoda Automatic Loom Works	14	0	5	9	12	42	−30	5

=== Kansai ===
Division 1
Pos	Team	Pld	W	D	L	GF	GA	GD	Pts
1	Banditonce Kobe	14	10	3	1	28	11	+17	33
2	Kobe 1970	14	10	2	2	26	6	+20	32
3	Ain Food	14	9	0	5	32	15	+17	27
4	Sanyo Electric Sumoto	14	7	1	6	18	22	−4	22
5	Laranja Kyoto	14	6	2	6	21	25	−4	20
6	Takada	14	3	2	9	18	31	−13	11
7	Hermano Osaka	14	3	0	11	15	39	−24	9
8	Kyoto BAMB	14	2	2	10	16	25	−9	8

Division 2
Pos	Team	Pld	W	D	L	GF	GA	GD	Pts
1	Sagawa Express Kyoto	14	12	1	1	55	8	+47	37
2	Kyoto Shiko Club	14	10	0	4	36	23	+13	30
3	Renaiss College	14	8	2	4	37	21	+16	26
4	Technonet Osaka	14	8	2	4	35	23	+12	26
5	Kihoku Shukyudan	14	6	2	6	32	36	−4	20
6	Mitsubishi Heavy Industries Kobe	14	5	2	7	15	27	−12	17
7	Kobe 1970 C	14	2	1	11	16	41	−25	7
8	Osaka Gas	14	0	0	14	9	56	−47	0

=== Chugoku ===
Pos	Team	Pld	W	PKW	PKL	L	GF	GA	GD	Pts
1	Sagawa Express Chugoku	12	9	1	1	1	44	9	+35	30
2	Fagiano Okayama	12	9	0	1	2	37	13	+24	28
3	Hiroshima Fujita	12	7	3	0	2	22	22	0	27
4	Hitachi Kasado	12	2	1	3	6	12	27	−15	11
5	Iwami	12	2	2	1	7	10	27	−17	11
6	JFE Steel West Japan	12	3	0	1	8	14	29	−15	10
7	Yamaguchi Teachers	12	1	2	2	7	11	23	−12	9

=== Shikoku ===
Pos	Team	Pld	W	D	L	GF	GA	GD	Pts
1	Nangoku Kochi	14	12	1	1	53	8	+45	37
2	Sanyo Electric Tokushima	14	11	2	1	42	10	+32	35
3	Ehime Shimanami	14	8	1	5	29	25	+4	25
4	Takamatsu	14	6	4	4	31	24	+7	22
5	Ventana	14	5	2	7	15	32	−17	17
6	Alex	14	4	1	9	25	33	−8	13
7	Sanwa Club	14	3	0	11	19	40	−21	9
8	Showa Club	14	1	1	12	8	50	−42	4

=== Kyushu ===
Pos	Team	Pld	W	PKW	PKL	L	GF	GA	GD	Pts
1	Rosso Kumamoto	18	15	0	2	1	45	11	+34	47
2	FC Ryukyu	18	13	1	1	3	51	12	+39	42
3	V-Varen Nagasaki	18	11	2	0	5	41	23	+18	37
4	Nippon Steel Oita	18	10	2	0	6	40	21	+19	34
5	Volca Kagoshima	18	10	1	1	6	49	26	+23	33
6	New Wave Kitakyushu	18	10	0	3	5	51	30	+21	33
7	Okinawa Kaiho Bank	18	5	1	1	11	18	37	−19	18
8	Okinawa Kariyushi	18	3	1	2	12	18	48	−30	13
9	Mitsubishi Heavy Industries Nagasaki	18	2	2	0	14	14	55	−41	10
10	Sun Miyazaki	18	0	1	1	16	16	80	−64	3
