= 2003 Japanese Regional Leagues =

Japanese amateur leagues football season

Japanese Regional Leagues
- Season: 2003

Statistics of Japanese Regional Leagues for the 2003 season.

== Champions list ==
Region	Champions
Hokkaido	Hokuden
Tohoku	TDK
Kanto	Horikoshi
Hokushinetsu	Japan Soccer College
Tokai	Shizuoka
Kansai	Ain Food
Chugoku	Mitsubishi Motors Mizushima
Shikoku	Nangoku Kochi
Kyushu	Okinawa Kariyushi

== League standings ==
=== Hokkaido ===
Pos	Team	Pld	W	PKW	PKL	L	GF	GA	GD	Pts
1	Hokuden	14	12	0	0	2	41	10	+31	36
2	Barefoot Hokkaido	14	8	2	1	3	47	21	+26	29
3	Sapporo	14	6	1	1	6	24	34	−10	21
4	Toyota Motors Hokkaido	14	5	2	1	6	22	20	+2	20
5	Blackpecker Hakodate	14	5	1	3	5	25	24	+1	20
6	Sapporo Thank	14	5	0	1	8	25	36	−11	16
7	Erizenmaki Vankei	14	3	2	2	7	24	37	−13	15
8	Chitose Bombers	14	3	1	0	10	13	39	−26	11

=== Tohoku ===
Division 1
Pos	Team	Pld	W	D	L	GF	GA	GD	Pts
1	TDK	14	8	5	1	38	12	+26	29
2	Primeiro	14	7	5	2	22	14	+8	26
3	Sagawa Express Tohoku	14	8	2	4	24	23	+1	26
4	NEC Tokin	14	6	1	7	19	22	−3	19
5	Akita City Government	14	5	4	5	21	25	−4	19
6	Morioka Zebra	14	4	3	7	16	20	−4	15
7	Nippon Steel Kamaishi	14	3	5	6	21	22	−1	14
8	Aster Aomori	14	1	3	10	11	34	−23	6

Division 2 North
Pos	Team	Pld	W	D	L	GF	GA	GD	Pts
1	Ashikaga Engineering Kawabe	10	7	0	3	35	9	+26	21
2	Tono Club	10	6	1	3	24	11	+13	19
3	Hokuto Bank SC	10	6	0	4	27	21	+6	18
4	Villanova Morioka	10	5	3	2	16	12	+4	18
5	Ground Self Defense Forces Hachinohe	10	2	2	6	12	26	−14	8
6	ReinMeer Aomori	10	1	0	9	10	45	−35	3

Division 2 South
Pos	Team	Pld	W	D	L	GF	GA	GD	Pts
1	Sendai Nakada Club	10	9	1	0	38	15	+23	28
2	Furukawa Battery	10	5	3	2	21	13	+8	18
3	Northern Peaks Koriyama	10	4	2	4	19	18	+1	14
4	Matsushima	10	4	0	6	13	24	−11	12
5	Yamagata	10	3	1	6	12	22	−10	10
6	Kushibiki Club	10	1	1	8	9	20	−11	4

=== Kanto ===
Division 1
Pos	Team	Pld	W	D	L	GF	GA	GD	Pts
1	Horikoshi	14	11	2	1	49	13	+36	35
2	Honda Luminozo Sayama	14	7	6	1	38	19	+19	27
3	Aries Tokyo	14	7	6	1	28	16	+12	27
4	Nirasaki Astros	14	4	5	5	25	25	0	17
5	Yaita	14	4	4	6	17	38	−21	16
6	Maritime Self Defense Forces Atsugi Base Marcus	14	4	3	7	17	25	−8	15
7	Ome	14	2	3	9	20	40	−20	9
8	Toho Titanium	14	1	3	10	19	37	−18	6

Division 2
Pos	Team	Pld	W	D	L	GF	GA	GD	Pts
1	Thespa Kusatsu	14	11	2	1	51	11	+40	35
2	Saitama	14	11	0	3	53	20	+33	33
3	JEF Ichihara Amateur	14	9	1	4	47	27	+20	28
4	Yokohama Sports and Culture Club	14	7	3	4	59	39	+20	24
5	Kuyo	14	6	1	7	37	40	−3	19
6	Hitachi Tochigi	14	4	0	10	25	55	−30	12
7	Hitachi Mito	14	3	1	10	23	43	−20	10
8	Koma Koma	14	1	0	13	12	72	−60	3

=== Hokushinetsu ===
Pos	Team	Pld	W	D	L	GF	GA	GD	Pts
1	Japan Soccer College	14	11	1	2	44	18	+26	34
2	Nagano Elsa	14	10	3	1	48	12	+36	33
3	Ueda Gentian	14	10	3	1	46	13	+33	33
4	Kanazawa	14	5	3	6	31	21	+10	18
5	Teihens	14	5	3	6	22	28	−6	18
6	Valiente Toyama	14	3	3	8	22	42	−20	12
7	Matto Orange Monkey	12	3	5	4	10	21	−11	14
8	Nissei Plastic Industrial	12	1	4	7	12	33	−21	7
9	Yamaga	12	1	4	7	13	42	−29	7
10	Niigatashuyukai	12	0	5	7	11	29	−18	5

=== Tokai ===
Division 1
Pos	Team	Pld	W	D	L	GF	GA	GD	Pts
1	Shizuoka	14	13	0	1	39	10	+29	39
2	Fujieda City Government	14	8	1	5	30	21	+9	25
3	Chuo Bohan	14	7	1	6	29	18	+11	22
4	Minolta	14	6	2	6	21	26	−5	20
5	Chukyo University	14	6	1	7	22	19	+3	19
6	Yazaki Valente	14	5	3	6	15	23	−8	18
7	Kasugai Club	14	3	1	10	20	32	−12	10
8	Hitachi Shimizu	14	2	3	9	16	43	−27	9

Division 2
Pos	Team	Pld	W	D	L	GF	GA	GD	Pts
1	Fuyo Club	16	11	1	4	44	27	+17	34
2	Honda Suzuka	16	10	1	5	49	23	+26	31
3	Maruyasu	16	9	4	3	40	19	+21	31
4	Yamaha Motors	16	8	3	5	37	27	+10	27
5	Nagoya Bank	16	8	0	8	43	44	−1	24
6	Toyota	16	5	5	6	29	37	−8	20
7	Nagoya	16	5	3	8	28	34	−6	18
8	Iga	16	5	2	9	21	42	−21	17
9	Suzuka Club	16	1	1	14	21	59	−38	4

=== Kansai ===
Pos	Team	Pld	W	D	L	GF	GA	GD	Pts
1	Ain Food	18	15	2	1	59	15	+44	47
2	Takada	18	12	2	4	33	19	+14	38
3	Kobe 1970	18	12	2	4	41	28	+13	38
4	Central Kobe	18	10	3	5	34	25	+9	33
5	Osaka Gas	18	7	2	9	28	33	−5	23
6	Laranja Kyoto	18	5	5	8	27	33	−6	20
7	Hermano Osaka	18	4	6	8	35	37	−2	18
8	Sanyo Electric Sumoto	18	3	6	9	19	35	−16	15
9	Kyoto Shiko Club	18	3	3	12	25	54	−29	12
10	Renaiss College	18	3	1	14	32	54	−22	10

=== Chugoku ===
Pos	Team	Pld	W	PKW	PKL	L	GF	GA	GD	Pts
1	Mitsubishi Motors Mizushima	14	12	0	1	1	34	7	+27	37
2	Tottori Kickers	14	8	2	0	4	28	13	+15	28
3	Iwami	14	6	3	0	5	20	19	+1	24
4	Hiroshima Fujita	14	5	2	1	6	23	24	−1	20
5	JFE Steel West Japan	14	4	2	2	6	23	34	−11	18
6	Hiroshima	14	4	0	4	6	25	30	−5	16
7	Mazda	14	3	1	3	7	19	31	−12	14
8	Yamaguchi Teachers	14	1	3	2	8	8	22	−14	11

=== Shikoku ===
Pos	Team	Pld	W	D	L	GF	GA	GD	Pts
1	Nangoku Kochi	14	13	1	0	59	9	+50	40
2	Imao	14	10	1	3	48	12	+36	31
3	Sanyo Electric Tokushima	14	6	4	4	23	18	+5	22
4	Alex	14	6	3	5	25	28	−3	21
5	Ventana	14	5	3	6	20	28	−8	18
6	Sunlife	14	4	1	9	28	36	−8	13
7	Sanwa Club	14	4	0	10	21	51	−30	12
8	Mediafarm Yanagimachi	14	1	1	12	15	57	−42	4

=== Kyushu ===
Pos	Team	Pld	W	PKW	PKL	L	GF	GA	GD	Pts
1	Okinawa Kariyushi	22	16	2	2	2	73	14	+59	54
2	Volca Kagoshima	22	15	2	2	3	50	18	+32	51
3	Nippon Steel Oita	22	15	1	1	5	48	18	+30	48
4	New Wave Kitakyushu	22	12	1	4	5	65	46	+19	42
5	Alouette Kumamoto	22	11	3	2	6	47	35	+12	41
6	Honda Lock	22	8	2	3	9	40	44	−4	31
7	Sun Miyazaki	22	8	2	1	11	63	62	+1	29
8	Okinawa Kaiho Bank	22	6	3	2	11	34	47	−13	26
9	Mitsubishi Heavy Industries Nagasaki	22	5	3	3	11	31	55	−24	24
10	Lanza Kumamoto	22	5	3	1	13	25	48	−23	22
11	Kyusyu Inax	22	4	2	1	15	18	49	−31	17
12	Kyocera Sendai	22	3	0	2	17	20	77	−57	11
