= 2009 Japanese Regional Leagues =

Japanese amateur leagues football season

Japanese Regional Leagues
- Season: 2009

Statistics of Japanese Regional Leagues for the 2009 season.

== Champions list ==
| Region | Champions | Runners-up | Third place | Fourth place |
|---|---|---|---|---|
| Hokkaido | **Sapporo Univ. GP** | Norbritz Hokkaido | Sapporo Shukyudan | Sapporo Wins |
| Tohoku | **Grulla Morioka** | Fukushima United | NEC Tokin | Primeiro |
| Kantō | **YSCC** | **Hitachi Tochigi Uva** | Club Dragons | Saitama |
| Hokushin'etsu | **Japan Soccer College** | Nagano Parceiro | Zweigen Kanazawa | Matsumoto Yamaga |
| Tōkai | **Yazaki Valente** | **Hamamatsu University** | Shizuoka | Fujieda City Government |
| Kansai | **Sanyo Electric Sumoto** | **Laranja Kyoto** | Ain Food | Banditonce Kakogawa |
| Chūgoku | Sagawa Express Chugoku | **Renofa Yamaguchi** | **NTN Okayama** | Ube Yahhh-Man |
| Shikoku | **Tokushima Vortis Second** | Kamatamare Sanuki | Ehime Shimanami | Sanyo Electric Tokushima |
| Kyushu | **Okinawa Kariyushi** | **Volca Kagoshima** | Nippon Steel Oita | Kyushu Sogo Sports College |

As of October 25, 2009

- Club names in **bold** indicates clubs advance to the Regional League promotion series held in late November. Club names in italic indicates winners and runners-up of All Japan Senior Football Championship which advance to the Regional League promotion series as well.

Source:33rd Regional Football League Tournament (in Japanese)

== Hokkaido ==
2009 Hokkaido League teams

2009 was the 32nd season of Hokkaido League. The season started on May 10 and ended on September 13.

It was contested by six teams and Sapporo University GP won the tournament.

After the season, Barefoot Hokkaido and Toyota Motor Hokkaido were relegated to the Block Leagues. They were replaced by Blackpecker Hakodate and Maruseizu FC

=== League table ===
| Pos | Team | Pld | W | D | L | GF | GA | GD | Pts | Qualification or relegation |
|---|---|---|---|---|---|---|---|---|---|---|
| 1 | Sapporo University GP (C) | 10 | 8 | 2 | 0 | 41 | 9 | +32 | 26 | Qualification for Regional League promotion series |
| 2 | Norbritz Hokkaido | 10 | 7 | 2 | 1 | 28 | 6 | +22 | 23 | |
| 3 | Sapporo FC | 10 | 4 | 1 | 5 | 17 | 26 | −9 | 13 | |
| 4 | Sapporo Winds | 10 | 3 | 3 | 4 | 18 | 27 | −9 | 12 | |
| 5 | Barefoot Hokkaido (R) | 10 | 2 | 1 | 7 | 13 | 26 | −13 | 7 | Relegation to Hokkaido Block leagues |
| 6 | Toyota Motor Hokkaido (R) | 10 | 1 | 1 | 8 | 11 | 34 | −23 | 4 | Relegation to Hokkaido Block leagues |

Updated to match(es) played on September 13, 2009. Source: Hokkaido Soccer League
Rules for classification: 1) points; 2) goal difference; 3) number of goals scored.
(C) Champions; (R) Relegated

=== Results ===
| Home \ Away | BAR | NOR | SAP | SGP | WIN | TMH |
|---|---|---|---|---|---|---|
| Barefoot Hokkaido | | 1–2 | 0–3 | 0–4 | 1–4 | 4–0 |
| Norbritz Hokkaido | 4–1 | | 4–0 | 3–3 | 4–0 | 3–0 |
| Sapporo FC | 1–3 | 0–2 | | 2–6 | 3–1 | 3–2 |
| Sapporo University GP | 1–0 | 1–0 | 2–2 | | 9–0 | 6–0 |
| Sapporo Winds | 2–2 | 0–0 | 6–2 | 1–3 | | 2–1 |
| Toyota Motor Hokkaido | 5–1 | 0–6 | 0–1 | 1–6 | 2–2 | |

Updated to match(es) played on September 13, 2009. Source: Hokkaido Soccer League
Legend: Blue = home team win; Yellow = draw; Red = away team win.

== Tohoku ==
=== Division 1 ===
2009 Tohoku League D1 teams

2009 was the 33rd season of Tohoku League. The season started on April 12 and ended on October 11.

It was contested by eight teams and Grulla Morioka won the championship for the third consecutive year.

After the season, Sendai Nakada were relegated to the second division (south group) and Cobaltore Onagawa took their place.

==== League table ====
| Pos | Team | Pld | W | D | L | GF | GA | GD | Pts | Qualification or relegation |
|---|---|---|---|---|---|---|---|---|---|---|
| 1 | Grulla Morioka (C) | 14 | 11 | 3 | 0 | 59 | 15 | +44 | 36 | Qualification for Regional League promotion series |
| 2 | Fukushima United | 14 | 11 | 3 | 0 | 51 | 8 | +43 | 36 | |
| 3 | NEC Tokin | 14 | 9 | 2 | 3 | 37 | 19 | +18 | 29 | |
| 4 | FC Primero | 14 | 6 | 0 | 8 | 24 | 28 | −4 | 18 | |
| 5 | Akita Cambiare | 14 | 5 | 2 | 7 | 17 | 43 | −26 | 17 | |
| 6 | Morioka Zebra | 14 | 3 | 1 | 10 | 18 | 45 | −27 | 10 | |
| 7 | Shiogama Wiese | 14 | 2 | 3 | 9 | 19 | 36 | −17 | 9 | Promotion/relegation Series |
| 8 | Sendai Nakada (R) | 14 | 1 | 2 | 11 | 14 | 45 | −31 | 5 | Relegation to Tohoku League Division 2 |

Updated to match(es) played on October 11, 2009. Source: Tohoku Soccer League
Rules for classification: 1) points; 2) goal difference; 3) number of goals scored.
(C) Champions; (R) Relegated

==== Results ====
| Home \ Away | CAM | FUK | GRU | NAK | NEC | PRM | WIE | ZEB |
|---|---|---|---|---|---|---|---|---|
| Akita Cambiare | | 0–6 | 1–2 | 2–1 | 1–2 | 1–2 | 1–0 | 1–1 |
| Fukushima United | 7–0 | | 1–1 | 3–0 | 2–0 | 3–0 | 4–1 | 3–0 |
| Grulla Morioka | 14–0 | 2–2 | | 5–0 | 7–2 | 2–1 | 5–1 | 4–3 |
| Sendai Nakada | 1–5 | 1–2 | 0–3 | | 2–5 | 2–5 | 3–3 | 0–2 |
| NEC Tokin | 4–0 | 2–2 | 0–0 | 6–0 | | 3–0 | 2–0 | 4–1 |
| FC Primero | 1–2 | 0–1 | 1–2 | 1–3 | 1–2 | | 3–2 | 4–2 |
| Shiogama Wiese | 1–1 | 0–6 | 2–3 | 1–1 | 3–1 | 2–3 | | 1–0 |
| Morioka Zebra | 1–2 | 1–9 | 1–9 | 2–0 | 0–4 | 1–2 | 3–2 | |

Updated to match(es) played on October 11, 2009. Source: First round, Second round
Legend: Blue = home team win; Yellow = draw; Red = away team win.

=== Division 2 ===
2009 was the 13th season of Tohoku League Division 2. North and South groups were won by Fuji Club 2003 and Cobaltore Onagawa respectively, and in post-season playoff series the latter earned promotion to Division 1.

2009 Tohoku Division 2 North League teams

==== North league table ====
| Pos | Team | Pld | W | D | L | GF | GA | GD | Pts | Qualification or relegation |
|---|---|---|---|---|---|---|---|---|---|---|
| 1 | Fuji Club 2003 (C) | 14 | 10 | 4 | 0 | 35 | 13 | +22 | 34 | Qualification for Tohoku Promotion Series |
| 2 | Nippon Steel Kamaishi | 14 | 9 | 0 | 5 | 38 | 26 | +12 | 27 | |
| 3 | Vanraure Hachinohe | 14 | 8 | 2 | 4 | 43 | 25 | +18 | 26 | |
| 4 | Mizusawa SC | 14 | 5 | 4 | 5 | 25 | 21 | +4 | 19 | |
| 5 | Grulla Istria | 14 | 5 | 1 | 8 | 34 | 40 | −6 | 16 | Disbanded (Note: Grulla Istria, the satellite team of Grulla Morioka was disbanded after the season. Since Reinmeer Aomori have already won the play-offs against prefectural league team, F.C. Shiwa regained their place in the division, though having accepted the relegation earlier.) |
| 6 | Tono Club | 14 | 5 | 0 | 9 | 24 | 34 | −10 | 15 | |
| 7 | ReinMeer Aomori | 14 | 4 | 3 | 7 | 21 | 33 | −12 | 15 | Prefectural promotion/relegation Series |
| 8 | FC Shiwa | 14 | 1 | 4 | 9 | 16 | 44 | −28 | 7 | Relegation to Tohoku prefectural leagues |

Updated to match(es) played on October 11, 2009. Source: Tohoku Soccer League
Rules for classification: 1) points; 2) goal difference; 3) number of goals scored.
(C) Champions

==== North league results ====
| Home \ Away | FJI | GRI | MIZ | NSK | REI | SHW | TNO | VAN |
|---|---|---|---|---|---|---|---|---|
| Fuji Club 2003 | | 4–0 | 1–1 | 2–1 | 2–2 | 2–0 | 2–0 | 4–3 |
| Grulla Istria | 2–2 | | 1–4 | 2–4 | 1–2 | 2–0 | 3–2 | 4–5 |
| Mizusawa SC | 1–2 | 1–2 | | 6–3 | 2–2 | 2–2 | 1–0 | 2–1 |
| Nippon Steel Kamaishi | 1–4 | 6–4 | 1–0 | | 5–1 | 2–0 | 0–2 | 5–1 |
| ReinMeer Aomori | 0–1 | 1–6 | 0–3 | 1–0 | | 3–3 | 2–3 | 0–1 |
| FC Shiwa | 0–6 | 1–6 | 1–1 | 0–3 | 1–3 | | 3–1 | 3–3 |
| Tono Club | 0–1 | 2–1 | 3–1 | 3–5 | 2–3 | 4–2 | | 1–7 |
| Vanraure Hachinohe | 2–2 | 6–0 | 2–0 | 0–2 | 3–1 | 6–0 | 3–1 | |

Updated to match(es) played on October 11, 2009. Source: First round, Second round
Legend: Blue = home team win; Yellow = draw; Red = away team win.
2010 Tohoku Division 2 South League teams

=== South ===
| Pos | Team | Pld | W | D | L | GF | GA | GD | Pts | Qualification or relegation |
|---|---|---|---|---|---|---|---|---|---|---|
| 1 | Cobaltore Onagawa (C, P) | 14 | 12 | 1 | 1 | 30 | 7 | +23 | 37 | Qualification for Tohoku Promotion Series |
| 2 | Bandits Iwaki | 14 | 9 | 0 | 5 | 30 | 25 | +5 | 27 | |
| 3 | Viancone Fukushima | 14 | 7 | 1 | 6 | 29 | 23 | +6 | 22 | |
| 4 | Iwaki Furukawa | 14 | 6 | 2 | 6 | 26 | 17 | +9 | 20 | |
| 5 | Merry | 14 | 5 | 4 | 5 | 25 | 22 | +3 | 19 | |
| 6 | Marysol Matsushima | 14 | 4 | 4 | 6 | 20 | 36 | −16 | 16 | |
| 7 | Soma SC | 14 | 3 | 3 | 8 | 20 | 32 | −12 | 12 | Prefectural promotion/relegation Series |
| 8 | Nakaniida SC (R) | 14 | 2 | 1 | 11 | 9 | 27 | −18 | 7 | Relegation to Tohoku prefectural leagues |

Updated to match(es) played on October 11, 2009. Source: Tohoku Soccer League
Rules for classification: 1) points; 2) goal difference; 3) number of goals scored.
(C) Champions; (P) Promoted; (R) Relegated

==== South league results ====
| Home \ Away | BAN | COB | IFU | MAR | MER | NKN | SOM | VIA |
|---|---|---|---|---|---|---|---|---|
| Bandits Iwaki | | 0–3 | 0–3 | 3–2 | 2–0 | 0–1 | 7–2 | 2–5 |
| Cobaltore Onagawa | 3–0 | | 1–0 | 1–1 | 2–0 | 3–1 | 1–0 | 3–0 |
| Iwaki Furukawa | 1–3 | 1–0 | | 6–0 | 1–3 | 0–1 | 2–2 | 1–2 |
| Marysol Matsushima | 1–2 | 0–3 | 1–1 | | 4–4 | 3–0 | 2–1 | 1–0 |
| Merry | 0–3 | 0–1 | 3–1 | 5–0 | | 3–1 | 0–0 | 1–1 |
| Nakaniida SC | 1–2 | 0–2 | 0–3 | 0–2 | 2–2 | | 0–2 | 1–2 |
| Soma SC | 2–3 | 3–4 | 1–3 | 1–1 | 2–3 | 2–1 | | 1–0 |
| Viancone Fukushima | 1–3 | 1–3 | 0–3 | 9–2 | 2–1 | 1–0 | 5–1 | |

Updated to match(es) played on October 11, 2009. Source: First round, Second round
Legend: Blue = home team win; Yellow = draw; Red = away team win.

=== Tohoku Promotion and Relegation Series ===
In order to decide the direct exchange between two divisions, two D2 winners played against each other in two-legged series. Cobaltore Onagawa defeated Fuji Club 2003 and received direct promotion to Division 1, replacing the bottom-placed Sendai Nakada, while Fuji Club 2003 were scheduled to face Shiogama Wiese in another two-legged series. By overall result, Shiogama Wiese have saved their Division 1 position.

The bottom-placed teams in both groups of Division 2 were directly relegated to the prefectural leagues, though in the north FC Shiwa have escaped relegation because of post-season disbandment of Grulla Istria. Their spots were filled by Omiya FC and Scheinen Fukushima, respectively. Second to last finishers, ReinMeer Aomori and Soma SC were scheduled to play against Hokuto Bank S.C. and Sakata Migaku Club, respectively, and both won their challenges, thus remaining in the Regional League for another year.

== Kanto ==
=== Division 1 ===
2010 Kanto League D1 teams

2009 was the 43rd season of Kanto League. The season started on April 4 and ended on September 6.

It was contested by eight teams and YSCC Yokohama won the championship for the second time in their history after two-year pause.

After the season, Hitachi Tochigi Uva were promoted to Japan Football League. Because of that, only Honda Luminozo Sayama were relegated to the second division, and both its winner and runner-up, Vertfee Takahara Nasu and Tonan Maebashi were promoted automatically.

==== League table ====
| Pos | Team | Pld | W | D | L | GF | GA | GD | Pts | Qualification or relegation |
|---|---|---|---|---|---|---|---|---|---|---|
| 1 | YSCC Yokohama (C) | 14 | 10 | 1 | 3 | 34 | 15 | +19 | 31 | Qualification for Regional League promotion series |
| 2 | Hitachi Tochigi Uva (P) | 14 | 10 | 1 | 3 | 30 | 16 | +14 | 31 | Qualification for Regional League promotion series |
| 3 | Club Dragons | 14 | 9 | 1 | 4 | 27 | 16 | +11 | 28 | |
| 4 | Saitama SC | 14 | 8 | 3 | 3 | 24 | 13 | +11 | 27 | |
| 5 | Atsugi Marcus | 14 | 6 | 2 | 6 | 20 | 16 | +4 | 20 | |
| 6 | FC Korea | 14 | 4 | 1 | 9 | 20 | 38 | −18 | 13 | |
| 7 | AC Almaleza | 14 | 4 | 0 | 10 | 13 | 30 | −17 | 12 | |
| 8 | Honda Luminozo Sayama (R) | 14 | 0 | 1 | 13 | 7 | 31 | −24 | 1 | Relegation to Kanto League Division 2 |

Updated to match(es) played on September 6, 2009. Source: Kanto Soccer League
Rules for classification: 1) points; 2) goal difference; 3) number of goals scored.
(C) Champions; (P) Promoted; (R) Relegated

==== Results ====
| Home \ Away | ALM | DRA | KOR | LUM | MRC | SAI | UVA | YSC |
|---|---|---|---|---|---|---|---|---|
| AC Almaleza | | 2–0 | 2–3 | 2–1 | 1–0 | 0–4 | 1–2 | 1–5 |
| Club Dragons | 4–0 | | 2–1 | 1–0 | 1–2 | 2–1 | 3–2 | 1–3 |
| FC Korea | 2–1 | 0–8 | | 5–1 | 0–1 | 1–4 | 1–3 | 0–5 |
| Honda Luminozo Sayama | 0–1 | 0–1 | 1–1 | | 1–4 | 0–1 | 1–3 | 0–2 |
| Atsugi Marcus | 2–1 | 0–1 | 4–2 | 2–0 | | 1–1 | 2–3 | 0–1 |
| Saitama SC | 2–0 | 2–2 | 1–0 | 2–1 | 2–1 | | 1–1 | 2–1 |
| Hitachi Tochigi Uva | 3–0 | 0–1 | 2–0 | 5–1 | 1–0 | 1–0 | | 0–2 |
| YSCC Yokohama | 2–1 | 3–0 | 3–4 | 1–0 | 1–1 | 2–1 | 3–4 | |

Updated to match(es) played on September 6, 2009. Source: Kanto Soccer League
Legend: Blue = home team win; Yellow = draw; Red = away team win.

=== Division 2 ===
2010 Kanto League D2 teams

2009 was the 7th season of Kanto League Division 2. It was won by Vertfee Takahara Nasu who earned promotion to Division 1 along with runners-up Tonan Maebashi. On the other end of the table, Yono Shukonkai were relegated and SG System and TM & NF Insurance were promoted from prefectural leagues.

==== League table ====
| Pos | Team | Pld | W | D | L | GF | GA | GD | Pts | Promotion or relegation |
|---|---|---|---|---|---|---|---|---|---|---|
| 1 | Vertfee Takahara Nasu (C, P) | 14 | 12 | 1 | 1 | 37 | 15 | +22 | 37 | Promotion to Kanto League Division 1 |
| 2 | Tonan Maebashi (P) | 14 | 10 | 0 | 4 | 38 | 14 | +24 | 30 | Promotion to Kanto League Division 1 |
| 3 | SAI Ichihara | 14 | 9 | 1 | 4 | 31 | 23 | +8 | 28 | |
| 4 | Toho Titanium | 14 | 6 | 4 | 4 | 29 | 25 | +4 | 22 | |
| 5 | Aries Tokyo | 14 | 7 | 1 | 6 | 27 | 24 | +3 | 22 | |
| 6 | Hitachi Building System | 14 | 4 | 1 | 9 | 17 | 37 | −20 | 13 | |
| 7 | Kanagawa Teachers | 14 | 2 | 1 | 11 | 24 | 39 | −15 | 7 | |
| 8 | Yono Shukonkai (R) | 14 | 1 | 1 | 12 | 10 | 36 | −26 | 4 | Relegation to Kanto Prefectural leagues |

Updated to match(es) played on September 6, 2009. Source: Kanto Soccer League
Rules for classification: 1) points; 2) goal difference; 3) number of goals scored.
(C) Champions; (P) Promoted; (R) Relegated

==== Results ====
| Home \ Away | ARI | BUI | ICH | KTE | TIT | TON | VRF | YOS |
|---|---|---|---|---|---|---|---|---|
| Aries Tokyo | | 1–1 | 0–1 | 2–1 | 4–3 | 0–1 | 2–3 | 2–0 |
| Hitachi Building System | 0–3 | | 1–4 | 0–1 | 3–6 | 1–4 | 0–5 | 2–0 |
| SAI Ichihara | 4–2 | 2–0 | | 4–3 | 0–2 | 0–4 | 0–1 | 6–2 |
| Kanagawa Teachers | 5–6 | 1–3 | 1–3 | | 2–4 | 2–6 | 2–3 | 2–3 |
| Toho Titanium | 2–0 | 0–3 | 1–1 | 2–2 | | 0–3 | 2–2 | 0–0 |
| Tonan Maebashi | 1–0 | 7–0 | 1–2 | 1–0 | 0–3 | | 2–3 | 6–1 |
| Vertfee Takahara Nasu | 1–3 | 5–0 | 5–0 | 2–1 | 4–2 | 1–0 | | 4–0 |
| Yono Shukonkai | 1–2 | 1–2 | 0–4 | 0–1 | 1–2 | 1–2 | 0–1 | |

Updated to match(es) played on September 6, 2009. Source: Kanto Soccer League
Legend: Blue = home team win; Yellow = draw; Red = away team win.

== Hokushin'etsu ==
=== Division 1 ===
2010 Hokushin'etsu League D1 teams

2009 was the 35th season of Hokushin'etsu League. The season started on April 11 and ended on August 2.

It was contested by eight teams and Japan Soccer College won the championship for the third time in their history after two-year pause.

After the season, Zweigen Kanazawa and Matsumoto Yamaga were promoted to Japan Football League. Because of that, no one were relegated. Because D2 champions, CUPS Seiro, were reserve team of Japan Soccer College, the promotion was given to the runner-up and third-placed team, Antelope Shiojiri and Teihens FC respectively.

==== League table ====
| Pos | Team | Pld | W | D | L | GF | GA | GD | Pts | Qualification |
|---|---|---|---|---|---|---|---|---|---|---|
| 1 | Japan Soccer College (C) | 14 | 11 | 2 | 1 | 30 | 11 | +19 | 35 | Qualification for Regional League promotion series |
| 2 | Nagano Parceiro | 14 | 9 | 4 | 1 | 59 | 14 | +45 | 31 | |
| 3 | Zweigen Kanazawa (P) | 14 | 10 | 1 | 3 | 49 | 9 | +40 | 31 | Qualification for Regional League promotion series (Note: Matsumoto Yamaga and Zweigen Kanazawa qualified as the winner and runner-up of Shakaijin Cup.) |
| 4 | Matsumoto Yamaga (P) | 14 | 9 | 2 | 3 | 40 | 14 | +26 | 29 | Qualification for Regional League promotion series |
| 5 | Saurcos Fukui | 14 | 3 | 1 | 10 | 15 | 41 | −26 | 10 | |
| 6 | Granscena Niigata | 14 | 3 | 1 | 10 | 19 | 59 | −40 | 10 | |
| 7 | Ueda Gentian | 14 | 2 | 2 | 10 | 14 | 39 | −25 | 8 | |
| 8 | Valiente Toyama | 14 | 2 | 1 | 11 | 9 | 48 | −39 | 7 | |

Updated to match(es) played on August 2, 2009. Source: Hokusnin'etsu Football League
Rules for classification: 1) points; 2) goal difference; 3) number of goals scored.
(C) Champions; (P) Promoted

==== Results ====
| Home \ Away | GEN | GRS | JSC | PAR | SAU | VAT | YAM | ZWE |
|---|---|---|---|---|---|---|---|---|
| Ueda Gentian | | 1–3 | 1–3 | 0–4 | 2–0 | 3–0 | 1–3 | 0–8 |
| Granscena Niigata | 2–1 | | 0–2 | 2–15 | 2–2 | 3–2 | 2–5 | 0–5 |
| Japan Soccer College | 2–1 | 2–1 | | 2–4 | 2–0 | 7–0 | 2–1 | 1–1 |
| Nagano Parceiro | 1–1 | 4–0 | 1–1 | | 9–1 | 6–0 | 2–2 | 1–2 |
| Saurcos Fukui | 3–0 | 4–2 | 1–2 | 1–2 | | 0–2 | 1–5 | 0–2 |
| Valiente Toyama | 2–2 | 2–1 | 0–1 | 0–7 | 0–2 | | 0–1 | 1–5 |
| Matsumoto Yamaga | 3–1 | 4–0 | 0–1 | 1–1 | 6–0 | 8–0 | | 0–3 |
| Zweigen Kanazawa | 5–0 | 10–1 | 0–2 | 1–2 | 5–0 | 2–0 | 0–1 | |

Updated to match(es) played on August 2, 2009. Source: First round, Second round
Legend: Blue = home team win; Yellow = draw; Red = away team win.

=== Division 2 ===
2010 Hokushin'etsu League D2 teams

2009 was the 6th season of Hokushin'etsu League Division 2. It was won by CUPS Seiro, but being a reserve team of Japan Soccer College, they were not eligible to promotion. Instead, the runner-up and the third-placed team, Antelope Shiojiri and Teihens FC respectively, were promoted.

Due to no team being relegated from D1, no relegation occurred in D2 either. After the season, Fukui KSC and Artista Tomi were promoted from Prefectural leagues.

==== League table ====
| Pos | Team | Pld | W | D | L | GF | GA | GD | Pts | Promotion or relegation |
|---|---|---|---|---|---|---|---|---|---|---|
| 1 | CUPS Seiro (C) | 14 | 10 | 0 | 4 | 39 | 14 | +25 | 30 | |
| 2 | Antelope Shiojiri (P) | 14 | 9 | 0 | 5 | 25 | 18 | +7 | 27 | Promotion to Hokushin'etsu League Division 1 (Note: CUPS Seiro are the reserve team of Japan Soccer College, thus not being eligible to promotion.) |
| 3 | Teihens FC (P) | 14 | 8 | 2 | 4 | 29 | 25 | +4 | 26 | Promotion to Hokushin'etsu League Division 1 |
| 4 | Niigata Uni. of Management | 14 | 7 | 3 | 4 | 30 | 16 | +14 | 24 | |
| 5 | Ohara Gakuen HS | 14 | 6 | 2 | 6 | 29 | 34 | −5 | 20 | |
| 6 | Maruoka Phoenix | 14 | 5 | 2 | 7 | 27 | 34 | −7 | 17 | |
| 7 | Niigata Uni. of H&W | 14 | 4 | 3 | 7 | 19 | 30 | −11 | 15 | |
| 8 | Goals FC | 14 | 1 | 0 | 13 | 11 | 38 | −27 | 3 | |

Updated to match(es) played on August 2, 2009. Source: Hokusnin'etsu Football League
Rules for classification: 1) points; 2) goal difference; 3) number of goals scored.
(C) Champions; (P) Promoted

==== Results ====
| Home \ Away | ANL | CUP | GOA | NHW | NUM | OHG | PHX | TEI |
|---|---|---|---|---|---|---|---|---|
| Antelope Shiojiri | | 2–0 | 1–0 | 5–0 | 2–1 | 3–2 | 3–1 | 3–1 |
| CUPS Seiro | 3–0 | | 4–2 | 2–0 | 0–1 | 2–1 | 1–2 | 5–0 |
| Goals FC | 0–1 | 0–5 | | 0–3 | 0–1 | 1–4 | 3–6 | 1–2 |
| Niigata Uni. of H&W | 1–0 | 1–4 | 2–1 | | 1–1 | 3–2 | 1–1 | 1–3 |
| Niigata Uni. of Management | 3–0 | 1–3 | 1–2 | 2–1 | | 6–0 | 4–1 | 0–2 |
| Ohara Gakuen HS | 3–2 | 0–5 | 3–1 | 3–2 | 1–1 | | 1–0 | 4–0 |
| Maruoka Phoenix | 1–2 | 1–3 | 2–0 | 2–2 | 1–6 | 6–3 | | 1–4 |
| Teihens FC | 2–1 | 3–2 | 3–0 | 4–1 | 2–2 | 2–2 | 1–2 | |

Updated to match(es) played on August 2, 2009. Source: First round, Second round
Legend: Blue = home team win; Yellow = draw; Red = away team win.

== Tokai ==
Division 1
| Pos | Team | Pld | W | D | L | GF | GA | GD | Pts |
|---|---|---|---|---|---|---|---|---|---|
| 1 | Yazaki Valente | 14 | 10 | 2 | 2 | 34 | 10 | +24 | 32 |
| 2 | Hamamatsu University | 14 | 9 | 1 | 4 | 33 | 13 | +20 | 28 |
| 3 | Shizuoka | 14 | 7 | 3 | 4 | 20 | 12 | +8 | 24 |
| 4 | Fujieda City Government | 14 | 6 | 2 | 6 | 20 | 18 | +2 | 20 |
| 5 | Chukyo University | 14 | 6 | 2 | 6 | 25 | 25 | 0 | 20 |
| 6 | Maruyasu Industries | 14 | 5 | 2 | 7 | 20 | 28 | −8 | 17 |
| 7 | Toyota | 14 | 3 | 1 | 10 | 15 | 31 | −16 | 10 |
| 8 | Konica Minolta Toyokawa | 14 | 3 | 1 | 10 | 13 | 43 | −30 | 10 |

2009 season finished on October 11, 2009

Division 2
| Pos | Team | Pld | W | D | L | GF | GA | GD | Pts |
|---|---|---|---|---|---|---|---|---|---|
| 1 | F.C. Suzuka Rampole | 14 | 9 | 4 | 1 | 40 | 10 | +30 | 31 |
| 2 | Fuyo Club | 14 | 7 | 3 | 4 | 24 | 19 | +5 | 24 |
| 3 | Ise Persona | 14 | 7 | 2 | 5 | 26 | 20 | +6 | 23 |
| 4 | Mind House Yokkaichi | 14 | 7 | 2 | 5 | 19 | 13 | +6 | 23 |
| 5 | Chukyo University Club | 14 | 7 | 1 | 6 | 33 | 30 | +3 | 22 |
| 6 | Kasugai Club | 14 | 5 | 2 | 7 | 20 | 23 | −3 | 17 |
| 7 | Nagoya | 14 | 5 | 2 | 7 | 17 | 24 | −7 | 17 |
| 8 | Sagawa Express Chukyo | 12 | 0 | 0 | 12 | 5 | 41 | −36 | 0 |

Source: F.C. Suzuka Rampole website - Tokai Soccer League standings (in Japanese)

2009 season finished on October 25, 2009

== Kansai ==
Division 1
| Pos | Team | Pld | W | D | L | GF | GA | GD | Pts |
|---|---|---|---|---|---|---|---|---|---|
| 1 | Sanyo Electric Sumoto | 14 | 10 | 1 | 3 | 31 | 11 | +20 | 31 |
| 2 | Laranja Kyoto | 14 | 9 | 2 | 3 | 35 | 14 | +21 | 29 |
| 3 | Ain Food | 14 | 9 | 0 | 5 | 21 | 12 | +9 | 27 |
| 4 | Banditonce Kakogawa | 14 | 7 | 0 | 7 | 22 | 22 | 0 | 21 |
| 5 | Hannan University Club | 14 | 6 | 2 | 6 | 27 | 18 | +9 | 20 |
| 6 | Biwako Hira | 14 | 5 | 2 | 7 | 17 | 25 | −8 | 17 |
| 7 | Shiga | 14 | 4 | 1 | 9 | 22 | 39 | −17 | 13 |
| 8 | Kyoto BAMB | 14 | 2 | 0 | 12 | 16 | 50 | −34 | 6 |

Source: Kansai Soccer League team standings - Div1 (in Japanese)
Rules for classification: 1) points; 2) goal difference; 3) number of goals scored.

2009 season finished on October 4, 2009

Division 2
| Pos | Team | Pld | W | D | L | GF | GA | GD | Pts |
|---|---|---|---|---|---|---|---|---|---|
| 1 | Nara Club | 14 | 9 | 3 | 2 | 47 | 18 | +29 | 30 |
| 2 | Renaiss Gakuen Kōga | 14 | 8 | 2 | 4 | 61 | 33 | +28 | 26 |
| 3 | Kyoto Shiko Club | 14 | 8 | 1 | 5 | 26 | 25 | +1 | 25 |
| 4 | Sakai | 14 | 6 | 5 | 3 | 27 | 18 | +9 | 23 |
| 5 | Kobe 1970 | 14 | 5 | 3 | 6 | 18 | 34 | −16 | 18 |
| 6 | Diablossa Takada F.C. | 14 | 4 | 4 | 6 | 25 | 32 | −7 | 16 |
| 7 | Mitsubishi Heavy Industrial Kobe | 14 | 4 | 1 | 9 | 16 | 36 | −20 | 13 |
| 8 | JST | 14 | 1 | 3 | 10 | 17 | 41 | −24 | 6 |

Source: Kansai Soccer League team standings - Div2 (in Japanese)
Rules for classification: 1) points; 2) goal difference; 3) number of goals scored.

2009 season finished on October 4, 2009

== Chūgoku ==
| Pos | Team | Pld | W | D | L | GF | GA | GD | Pts |
|---|---|---|---|---|---|---|---|---|---|
| 1 | Sagawa Express Chugoku (Note: Sagawa Express Chugoku declined berth in Regional Promotion Series at the request of owner Sagawa Express, which also owns Sagawa Shiga F.C. in Japan Football League. NTN Okayama thus substituted.) | 18 | 14 | 4 | 0 | 55 | 13 | +42 | 46 |
| 2 | Renofa Yamaguchi | 18 | 13 | 1 | 4 | 53 | 21 | +32 | 40 |
| 3 | NTN Okayama | 18 | 12 | 3 | 3 | 39 | 18 | +21 | 39 |
| 4 | Ube Yahhh-Man | 18 | 9 | 2 | 7 | 41 | 32 | +9 | 29 |
| 5 | Nippon Petroleum Mizushima | 18 | 8 | 1 | 9 | 32 | 32 | 0 | 25 |
| 6 | Dezzolla Shimane | 18 | 6 | 2 | 10 | 23 | 37 | −14 | 20 |
| 7 | Hitachi Kasado | 18 | 5 | 3 | 10 | 29 | 46 | −17 | 18 |
| 8 | JFE Steel West Japan | 18 | 4 | 3 | 11 | 22 | 46 | −24 | 15 |
| 9 | Mazda | 18 | 3 | 4 | 11 | 14 | 36 | −22 | 13 |
| 10 | Genki | 18 | 3 | 3 | 12 | 18 | 45 | −27 | 12 |

Source: 2009 Chugoku Soccer League Result (in Japanese)
Rules for classification: 1) points; 2) goal difference; 3) number of goals scored.
Notes:

2009 season finished on October 25, 2009

== Shikoku ==
| Pos | Team | Pld | W | D | L | GF | GA | GD | Pts |
|---|---|---|---|---|---|---|---|---|---|
| 1 | Tokushima Vortis Second | 14 | 13 | 1 | 0 | 62 | 7 | +55 | 40 |
| 2 | Kamatamare Sanuki | 14 | 12 | 0 | 2 | 56 | 10 | +46 | 36 |
| 3 | Ehime Shimanami | 14 | 7 | 2 | 5 | 26 | 16 | +10 | 23 |
| 4 | Sanyo Electric Tokushima | 14 | 5 | 1 | 8 | 24 | 36 | −12 | 16 |
| 5 | Nangoku Kochi | 14 | 4 | 2 | 8 | 17 | 42 | −25 | 14 |
| 6 | Minami Club | 14 | 3 | 4 | 7 | 15 | 31 | −16 | 13 |
| 7 | Ventana | 14 | 3 | 2 | 9 | 13 | 30 | −17 | 11 |
| 8 | Nankoku Torastar | 14 | 2 | 2 | 10 | 13 | 54 | −41 | 8 |

Source: Shikoku Soccer League Score (in Japanese) Kamatamare Sanuki official website
Rules for classification: 1) points; 2) goal difference; 3) number of goals scored.

2009 season finished on October 25, 2009

== Kyushu ==
| Pos | Team | Pld | W | PKW | PKL | L | GF | GA | GD | Pts |
|---|---|---|---|---|---|---|---|---|---|---|
| 1 | Okinawa Kariyushi | 16 | 12 | 3 | 0 | 1 | 54 | 16 | +38 | 42 |
| 2 | Volca Kagoshima | 16 | 11 | 0 | 3 | 2 | 43 | 23 | +20 | 36 |
| 3 | Nippon Steel Oita | 16 | 8 | 2 | 1 | 5 | 45 | 28 | +17 | 29 |
| 4 | Kyushu Sogo Sports College | 16 | 6 | 3 | 1 | 6 | 36 | 35 | +1 | 25 |
| 5 | Okinawa Kaiho Bank | 16 | 6 | 1 | 3 | 6 | 22 | 21 | +1 | 23 |
| 6 | Kyusyu Inax | 16 | 7 | 0 | 0 | 9 | 34 | 28 | +6 | 21 |
| 7 | Kawasoe Club | 16 | 5 | 1 | 2 | 8 | 20 | 34 | −14 | 19 |
| 8 | Mitsubishi Heavy Industries Nagasaki | 16 | 2 | 2 | 2 | 10 | 13 | 37 | −24 | 12 |
| 9 | Vainqueur Kumamoto | 16 | 3 | 0 | 0 | 13 | 18 | 63 | −45 | 9 |

Source: Kyushu League 2009 team standings (in Japanese)

2009 season finished on September 6, 2009
