= 2004 Japanese Regional Leagues =

Japanese amateur leagues football season

Japanese Regional Leagues
- Season: 2004

Statistics of Japanese Regional Leagues for the 2004 season.

== Champions list ==
| Region | Champions |
|---|---|
| Hokkaido | Norbritz Hokkaido |
| Tohoku | TDK |
| Kanto | Honda Luminozo Sayama |
| Hokushinetsu | Kanazawa |
| Tokai | Yazaki Valente |
| Kansai | Laranja Kyoto |
| Chugoku | Mitsubishi Motors Mizushima |
| Shikoku | Nangoku Kochi |
| Kyushu | Honda Lock |

== League standings ==
=== Hokkaido ===
| Pos | Team | Pld | W | D | L | GF | GA | GD | Pts |
|---|---|---|---|---|---|---|---|---|---|
| 1 | Norbritz Hokkaido | 14 | 12 | 1 | 1 | 35 | 10 | +25 | 37 |
| 2 | Barefoot Hokkaido | 14 | 9 | 2 | 3 | 45 | 22 | +23 | 29 |
| 3 | Blackpecker Hakodate | 14 | 9 | 2 | 3 | 28 | 22 | +6 | 29 |
| 4 | Thank Kuriyama | 14 | 8 | 1 | 5 | 25 | 18 | +7 | 25 |
| 5 | Toyota Motors Hokkaido | 14 | 5 | 2 | 7 | 26 | 27 | −1 | 17 |
| 6 | Sapporo | 14 | 2 | 4 | 8 | 22 | 42 | −20 | 10 |
| 7 | R. Superb Kushiro | 14 | 1 | 4 | 9 | 13 | 31 | −18 | 7 |
| 8 | Erizenmaki Vankei | 14 | 1 | 2 | 11 | 14 | 36 | −22 | 5 |

=== Tohoku ===
Division 1
| Pos | Team | Pld | W | D | L | GF | GA | GD | Pts |
|---|---|---|---|---|---|---|---|---|---|
| 1 | TDK | 14 | 11 | 1 | 2 | 43 | 10 | +33 | 34 |
| 2 | Shiogama Wiese | 14 | 8 | 2 | 4 | 37 | 28 | +9 | 26 |
| 3 | NEC Tokin | 14 | 7 | 2 | 5 | 21 | 18 | +3 | 23 |
| 4 | Akita City Government | 14 | 6 | 2 | 6 | 25 | 25 | 0 | 20 |
| 5 | Nippon Steel Kamaishi | 14 | 5 | 4 | 5 | 24 | 21 | +3 | 19 |
| 6 | Primeiro | 14 | 4 | 7 | 3 | 30 | 28 | +2 | 19 |
| 7 | Morioka Zebra | 14 | 4 | 2 | 8 | 22 | 26 | −4 | 14 |
| 8 | Ashikaga Engineering Kawabe | 14 | 0 | 2 | 12 | 11 | 57 | −46 | 2 |

Division 2 North
| Pos | Team | Pld | W | D | L | GF | GA | GD | Pts |
|---|---|---|---|---|---|---|---|---|---|
| 1 | Grulla Morioka | 10 | 9 | 1 | 0 | 54 | 9 | +45 | 28 |
| 2 | Hokuto Bank SC | 10 | 6 | 0 | 4 | 30 | 23 | +7 | 18 |
| 3 | Tono Club | 10 | 5 | 0 | 5 | 30 | 22 | +8 | 15 |
| 4 | Aster Aomori | 10 | 4 | 1 | 5 | 16 | 18 | −2 | 13 |
| 5 | Sanno Club | 10 | 4 | 0 | 6 | 19 | 39 | −20 | 12 |
| 6 | Ground Self Defence Forces Hachinohe | 10 | 1 | 0 | 9 | 13 | 51 | −38 | 3 |

Division 2 South
| Pos | Team | Pld | W | D | L | GF | GA | GD | Pts |
|---|---|---|---|---|---|---|---|---|---|
| 1 | Northern Peaks Koriyama | 10 | 8 | 0 | 2 | 29 | 13 | +16 | 24 |
| 2 | Furukawa Battery | 10 | 7 | 1 | 2 | 31 | 11 | +20 | 22 |
| 3 | Sendai Nakada Club | 10 | 6 | 1 | 3 | 25 | 16 | +9 | 19 |
| 4 | Marysol Matsushima | 10 | 4 | 0 | 6 | 22 | 29 | −7 | 12 |
| 5 | Kureha | 10 | 3 | 1 | 6 | 15 | 27 | −12 | 10 |
| 6 | Yamagata | 10 | 0 | 1 | 9 | 9 | 35 | −26 | 1 |

=== Kanto ===
Division 1
| Pos | Team | Pld | W | D | L | GF | GA | GD | Pts |
|---|---|---|---|---|---|---|---|---|---|
| 1 | Honda Luminozo Sayama | 14 | 10 | 3 | 1 | 43 | 14 | +29 | 33 |
| 2 | Maritime Self Defence Forces Atsugi Base Marcus | 14 | 6 | 2 | 6 | 26 | 26 | 0 | 20 |
| 3 | Saitama | 14 | 6 | 2 | 6 | 19 | 24 | −5 | 20 |
| 4 | Toho Titanium | 14 | 6 | 2 | 6 | 16 | 23 | −7 | 20 |
| 5 | Aries Tokyo | 14 | 6 | 1 | 7 | 23 | 19 | +4 | 19 |
| 6 | Yaita | 14 | 6 | 1 | 7 | 21 | 28 | −7 | 19 |
| 7 | Nirasaki Astros | 14 | 5 | 3 | 6 | 26 | 25 | +1 | 18 |
| 8 | Ome | 14 | 4 | 0 | 10 | 22 | 37 | −15 | 12 |

Division 2
| Pos | Team | Pld | W | D | L | GF | GA | GD | Pts |
|---|---|---|---|---|---|---|---|---|---|
| 1 | JEF United Ichihara Amateur | 14 | 12 | 0 | 2 | 61 | 17 | +44 | 36 |
| 2 | Yokohama Sports and Culture Club | 14 | 10 | 1 | 3 | 51 | 18 | +33 | 31 |
| 3 | Kanagawa Teachers | 14 | 8 | 3 | 3 | 30 | 26 | +4 | 27 |
| 4 | Hitachi Tochigi | 14 | 6 | 3 | 5 | 24 | 19 | +5 | 21 |
| 5 | Kuyo | 14 | 4 | 4 | 6 | 35 | 26 | +9 | 16 |
| 6 | Furukawa Chiba | 14 | 5 | 1 | 8 | 25 | 35 | −10 | 16 |
| 7 | Hitachi Mito | 14 | 5 | 0 | 9 | 27 | 31 | −4 | 15 |
| 8 | Minami Alps | 14 | 0 | 0 | 14 | 4 | 85 | −81 | 0 |

=== Hokushinetsu ===
Division 1
| Pos | Team | Pld | W | D | L | GF | GA | GD | Pts |
|---|---|---|---|---|---|---|---|---|---|
| 1 | Kanazawa | 14 | 9 | 1 | 4 | 41 | 19 | +22 | 28 |
| 2 | Japan Soccer College | 14 | 9 | 1 | 4 | 35 | 15 | +20 | 28 |
| 3 | Nagano Elsa | 14 | 9 | 1 | 4 | 33 | 16 | +17 | 28 |
| 4 | Ueda Gentian | 14 | 9 | 1 | 4 | 39 | 25 | +14 | 28 |
| 5 | Matto | 14 | 6 | 4 | 4 | 27 | 28 | −1 | 22 |
| 6 | Teihens | 14 | 3 | 3 | 8 | 22 | 30 | −8 | 12 |
| 7 | Nissei Plastic Industrial | 14 | 2 | 3 | 9 | 21 | 46 | −25 | 9 |
| 8 | Valiente Toyama | 14 | 1 | 2 | 11 | 15 | 54 | −39 | 5 |

Division 2
| Pos | Team | Pld | W | D | L | GF | GA | GD | Pts |
|---|---|---|---|---|---|---|---|---|---|
| 1 | Niigata University of Management | 14 | 11 | 0 | 3 | 32 | 10 | +22 | 33 |
| 2 | Antelope Shiojiri | 14 | 10 | 0 | 4 | 33 | 19 | +14 | 30 |
| 3 | Giocatore Takaoka | 14 | 7 | 1 | 6 | 32 | 18 | +14 | 22 |
| 4 | Fukui | 14 | 7 | 1 | 6 | 27 | 30 | −3 | 22 |
| 5 | TOP Niigata | 14 | 6 | 1 | 7 | 20 | 19 | +1 | 19 |
| 6 | Yamaga | 14 | 4 | 2 | 8 | 16 | 27 | −11 | 14 |
| 7 | PFU | 14 | 4 | 2 | 8 | 17 | 30 | −13 | 14 |
| 8 | Billboard | 14 | 0 | 5 | 9 | 9 | 33 | −24 | 5 |

=== Tokai ===
Division 1
| Pos | Team | Pld | W | D | L | GF | GA | GD | Pts |
|---|---|---|---|---|---|---|---|---|---|
| 1 | Yazaki Valente | 14 | 8 | 5 | 1 | 32 | 19 | +13 | 29 |
| 2 | Chukyo University | 14 | 9 | 1 | 4 | 26 | 15 | +11 | 28 |
| 3 | Shizuoka | 14 | 7 | 1 | 6 | 37 | 26 | +11 | 22 |
| 4 | Fujieda City Government | 14 | 6 | 4 | 4 | 21 | 17 | +4 | 22 |
| 5 | Chuo Bohan | 14 | 5 | 2 | 7 | 24 | 30 | −6 | 17 |
| 6 | Honda Suzuka | 14 | 5 | 2 | 7 | 17 | 32 | −15 | 17 |
| 7 | Konica Minolta Toyokawa | 14 | 4 | 4 | 6 | 22 | 26 | −4 | 16 |
| 8 | Fuyo Club | 14 | 2 | 1 | 11 | 17 | 31 | −14 | 7 |

Division 2
| Pos | Team | Pld | W | D | L | GF | GA | GD | Pts |
|---|---|---|---|---|---|---|---|---|---|
| 1 | Maruyasu | 14 | 10 | 2 | 2 | 28 | 15 | +13 | 32 |
| 2 | Nagoya | 14 | 6 | 6 | 2 | 29 | 22 | +7 | 24 |
| 3 | Gifu | 14 | 8 | 0 | 6 | 22 | 21 | +1 | 24 |
| 4 | Toyoda Automatic Loom Works | 14 | 6 | 3 | 5 | 30 | 28 | +2 | 21 |
| 5 | Nagoya Bank | 14 | 6 | 3 | 5 | 20 | 25 | −5 | 21 |
| 6 | Kasugai Club | 14 | 6 | 2 | 6 | 26 | 22 | +4 | 20 |
| 7 | Yamaha Motors | 14 | 3 | 3 | 8 | 27 | 26 | +1 | 12 |
| 8 | Toyota | 14 | 0 | 3 | 11 | 14 | 37 | −23 | 3 |

=== Kansai ===
| Pos | Team | Pld | W | D | L | GF | GA | GD | Pts |
|---|---|---|---|---|---|---|---|---|---|
| 1 | Laranja Kyoto | 20 | 16 | 2 | 2 | 52 | 15 | +37 | 50 |
| 2 | Ain Food | 20 | 12 | 5 | 3 | 55 | 14 | +41 | 41 |
| 3 | Kyoto BAMB | 20 | 10 | 9 | 1 | 34 | 16 | +18 | 39 |
| 4 | Central Kobe | 20 | 11 | 4 | 5 | 55 | 21 | +34 | 37 |
| 5 | Kobe 1970 | 20 | 11 | 2 | 7 | 63 | 41 | +22 | 35 |
| 6 | Hermano Osaka | 20 | 10 | 3 | 7 | 44 | 33 | +11 | 33 |
| 7 | Takada | 20 | 8 | 3 | 9 | 39 | 32 | +7 | 27 |
| 8 | Sanyo Electric Sumoto | 20 | 6 | 5 | 9 | 30 | 36 | −6 | 23 |
| 9 | Kyoto Shiko Club | 20 | 6 | 2 | 12 | 26 | 51 | −25 | 20 |
| 10 | Kihoku | 20 | 1 | 2 | 17 | 22 | 102 | −80 | 5 |
| 11 | Osaka Gas | 20 | 0 | 1 | 19 | 10 | 69 | −59 | 1 |

=== Chugoku ===
| Pos | Team | Pld | W | PKW | PKL | L | GF | GA | GD | Pts | Qualification or relegation |
|---|---|---|---|---|---|---|---|---|---|---|---|
| 1 | Mitsubishi Motors Mizushima | 14 | 13 | 1 | 0 | 0 | 40 | 6 | +34 | 41 | Qualification for the 2004 Japanese Regional Football League Competition |
| 2 | Hiroshima Fujita | 14 | 8 | 2 | 1 | 3 | 30 | 15 | +15 | 29 | |
| 3 | Sagawa Express Chugoku | 14 | 8 | 1 | 0 | 5 | 30 | 19 | +11 | 26 | |
| 4 | Hitachi Kasado | 14 | 6 | 1 | 0 | 7 | 25 | 31 | −6 | 20 | |
| 5 | Iwami | 14 | 4 | 2 | 1 | 7 | 20 | 26 | −6 | 17 | |
| 6 | JFE Steel West Japan | 14 | 3 | 1 | 4 | 6 | 19 | 29 | −10 | 15 | |
| 7 | Tottori Kickers | 14 | 4 | 0 | 1 | 9 | 19 | 25 | −6 | 13 | Playoff against the Prefectural qualifiers |
| 8 | Hiroshima F.C. | 14 | 2 | 0 | 1 | 11 | 14 | 46 | −32 | 7 | Playoff against the Prefectural qualifiers |

Source: RSSSF Japanese Regional Leagues 2004
Rules for classification: 1) Points; 2) Goal difference; 3) Goals scored

==== Promotion/relegation playoff ====
12 December 2004

| Hiroshima FC (Chugoku Soccer League 8th place) | 0–1 | Yamaguchi Teachers SC |

19 December 2004

| Yamaguchi Teachers SC | 2-1 | Hiroshima FC |

12 December 2004

| Tottori Kickers FC (Chugoku Soccer League 7th place) | 1–2 | Fagiano Okayama |

19 December 2004

| Fagiano Okayama | 2-0 | Tottori Kickers FC |

=== Shikoku ===
| Pos | Team | Pld | W | D | L | GF | GA | GD | Pts | Qualification or relegation |
|---|---|---|---|---|---|---|---|---|---|---|
| 1 | Nangoku Kochi | 14 | 12 | 1 | 1 | 63 | 10 | +53 | 37 | Qualification for the 2004 Japanese Regional Football League Competition |
| 2 | Ehime Shimanami | 14 | 10 | 2 | 2 | 48 | 19 | +29 | 32 | |
| 3 | Sunlife | 14 | 8 | 0 | 6 | 29 | 26 | +3 | 24 | |
| 4 | Sanwa Club | 14 | 5 | 2 | 7 | 16 | 30 | −14 | 17 | |
| 5 | Alex | 14 | 5 | 0 | 9 | 24 | 36 | −12 | 15 | |
| 6 | Sanyo Electric Tokushima | 14 | 4 | 2 | 8 | 24 | 35 | −11 | 14 | |
| 7 | Mediafarm Yanagimachi | 14 | 3 | 5 | 6 | 20 | 34 | −14 | 14 | Playoff against the Prefectural qualifiers |
| 8 | Ventana | 14 | 1 | 4 | 9 | 17 | 51 | −34 | 7 | Playoff against the Prefectural qualifiers |

Source: RSSSF Japanese Regional Leagues 2004

==== Promotion/relegation playoff ====
30 January 2005

| FC Yanagimachi (Shikoku Football League 7th place) | 0–4 | Showa Club |

6 February 2005

| Showa Club | 0-2 | FC Yanagimachi |

30 January 2005

| Ventana AC (Shikoku Football League 8th place) | 3–4 | Tokushima FC Caballos 2002 |

6 February 2005

| Tokushima FC Caballos 2002 | 0-3 | Ventana AC |

=== Kyushu ===
| Pos | Team | Pld | W | PKW | PKL | L | GF | GA | GD | Pts | Qualification or relegation |
|---|---|---|---|---|---|---|---|---|---|---|---|
| 1 | Honda Lock | 18 | 14 | 2 | 1 | 1 | 52 | 16 | +36 | 47 | Qualification for the 2004 Japanese Regional Football League Competition |
| 2 | Okinawa Kariyushi | 18 | 14 | 1 | 0 | 3 | 54 | 15 | +39 | 44 | |
| 3 | Volca Kagoshima | 18 | 12 | 1 | 0 | 5 | 41 | 26 | +15 | 38 | |
| 4 | Alouette Kumamoto | 18 | 10 | 0 | 1 | 7 | 63 | 38 | +25 | 31 | |
| 5 | Nippon Steel Oita | 18 | 9 | 0 | 3 | 6 | 35 | 24 | +11 | 30 | |
| 6 | New Wave Kitakyushu | 18 | 9 | 0 | 1 | 8 | 41 | 39 | +2 | 28 | |
| 7 | Okinawa Kaiho Bank | 18 | 6 | 1 | 0 | 11 | 22 | 51 | −29 | 20 | |
| 8 | Sun Miyazaki | 18 | 3 | 1 | 2 | 12 | 33 | 65 | −32 | 13 | |
| 9 | Mitsubishi Heavy Industries Nagasaki | 18 | 3 | 1 | 0 | 14 | 34 | 55 | −21 | 11 | |
| 10 | Osumi NIFS United | 18 | 2 | 1 | 0 | 15 | 27 | 73 | −46 | 8 | Relegated to the Prefectural Leagues |

Source: RSSSF Japanese Regional Leagues 2004
Rules for classification: 1) Points; 2) Goal difference; 3) Goals scored; 4) Drawn matches are decided by penalty shoot-out; winner gets 2 pts, loser gets 1 pt.
