= Norbritz Hokkaido =

Japanese football club

Norbritz Hokkaido ノルブリッツ北海道
- Full name: Club Fields Norbritz Hokkaido
- Founded: 1985; 41 years ago
- Ground: Sapporo Football Amusement Park; Sapporo, Hokkaido
- Capacity: 200
- League: Hokkaido Soccer League
- 2024: 4th of 8
- Website: www.footballnavi.jp/clubfields/
Home colours	Away colours

Club Fields Norbritz Hokkaido (クラブフィールズ・ノルブリッツ北海道, Kurabufīruzu Noruburittsu Hokkaidō) commonly known as Norbritz Hokkaido (ノルブリッツ北海道, Noruburittsu Hokkaidō) is a Japanese football club from Ebetsu, Hokkaido, within the Sapporo metropolitan area. They play in the Hokkaido League, the regionalised fifth level of the Japanese football league system.

== History ==
It was founded on 1985 as Hokkaido Electric Power Company F.C., as a branch of the regional utility. In 2004 the club changed its name to Norbritz, and began as an independent entity. The club name of Norbritz is a portmanteau of the German words "nord" and "blitz" (albeit improperly romanised; the correct should be Norblitz), meaning Northern Lightning.

They have clinched the Hokkaido League title a record 18 times. In 2012, after another league win, Norbritz entered the Regional League promotion series, finishing third and earning a spot in a play-off against the 17th-placed team of the 2012 Japan Football League, Tochigi Uva F.C. They narrowly lost on penalties, missing out on a place in the JFL.

== League record ==
Champions	Runners-up	Third place	Promoted	Relegated

League													Emperor's Cup
Season	Division	Tier	Teams	Pos.	GP	W	D	L	F	A	GD	Pts	Emperor's Cup
2004	Hokkaido Soccer; League (Div. 1)	4	8	1st	14	12	1	1	35	10	25	37	Did not qualify
2005	Hokkaido Soccer; League (Div. 1)	4	8	1st	14	12	1	1	37	13	24	37	Did not qualify
2006	Hokkaido Soccer; League (Div. 1)	4	8	1st	14	10	3	1	37	5	32	33	1st round
2007	Hokkaido Soccer; League (Div. 1)	4	8	1st	14	14	0	0	62	9	53	42	Did not qualify
2008	Hokkaido Soccer; League (Div. 1)	4	8	1st	14	9	4	1	54	19	35	31	Did not qualify
2009	Hokkaido Soccer; League (Div. 1)	4	6	2nd	10	7	2	1	28	6	22	23	1st round
2010	Hokkaido Soccer; League (Div. 1)	4	6	2nd	10	7	2	1	67	6	61	23	Did not qualify
2011	Hokkaido Soccer; League (Div. 1)	4	8	1st	14	12	2	0	64	8	56	38	Did not qualify
2012	Hokkaido Soccer; League (Div. 1)	4	8	1st	14	14	0	0	71	2	69	42	Did not qualify
2013	Hokkaido Soccer; League (Div. 1)	4	8	1st	14	11	0	3	40	12	28	33	Did not qualify
2014	Hokkaido Soccer; League (Div. 1)	5	8	3rd	14	10	1	3	41	20	21	31	1st round
2015	Hokkaido Soccer; League (Div. 1)	5	8	2nd	14	10	3	1	37	16	21	33	Did not qualify
2016	Hokkaido Soccer; League (Div. 1)	5	8	1st	14	9	5	0	47	11	36	32	Did not qualify
2017	Hokkaido Soccer; League (Div. 1)	5	8	3rd	14	9	2	3	32	13	19	29	1st round
2018	Hokkaido Soccer; League (Div. 1)	5	8	2nd	14	12	0	2	67	12	55	36	Did not qualify
2019	Hokkaido Soccer; League (Div. 1)	5	8	3rd	14	8	3	3	49	19	30	27	Did not qualify
2020	Hokkaido Soccer; League (Div. 1)	5	8	2nd	7	6	0	1	38	5	33	18	Did not qualify
2021	Hokkaido Soccer; League (Div. 1)	5	8	2nd	5	5	0	0	24	3	21	15	Did not qualify
2022	Hokkaido Soccer; League (Div. 1)	5	8	3rd	14	8	3	3	31	14	17	27	Did not qualify
2023	Hokkaido Soccer; League (Div. 1)	5	8	3rd	14	9	0	5	40	29	11	27	Did not qualify
2024	Hokkaido Soccer; League (Div. 1)	5	8	4th	14	6	3	5	32	30	2	21	Did not qualify
2025	Hokkaido Soccer; League (Div. 1)	5	8	3rd	14	6	3	5	23	26	-3	21	Did not qualify
2026	Hokkaido Soccer; League (Div. 1)	5	8	TBD	14								TBD

Key

- Pos. = Position in league; GP = Games played; W = Games won; D = Games drawn; L = Games lost; Pts = Points gained
- Data Source rsssf.org

== Honours ==
Norbritz Hokkaido honours
Honour	No.	Years
Hokkaido Soccer League	18	1992, 1993, 1995, 1996, 1997, 1998, 1999, 2000, 2003, 2004, 2005, 2006, 2007, 2008, 2011, 2012, 2013, 2016
