= Valiente Toyama =

Valiente Toyama ヴァリエンテ富山
- Nickname: Valiente
- Founded: 1971
- Ground: Iwase Sports Park
- Website: http://valiente-toyama.net

Valiente Toyama, formerly Seiyū Club, is an amateur football club based in Imizu, Toyama Prefecture, Japan.

== History ==
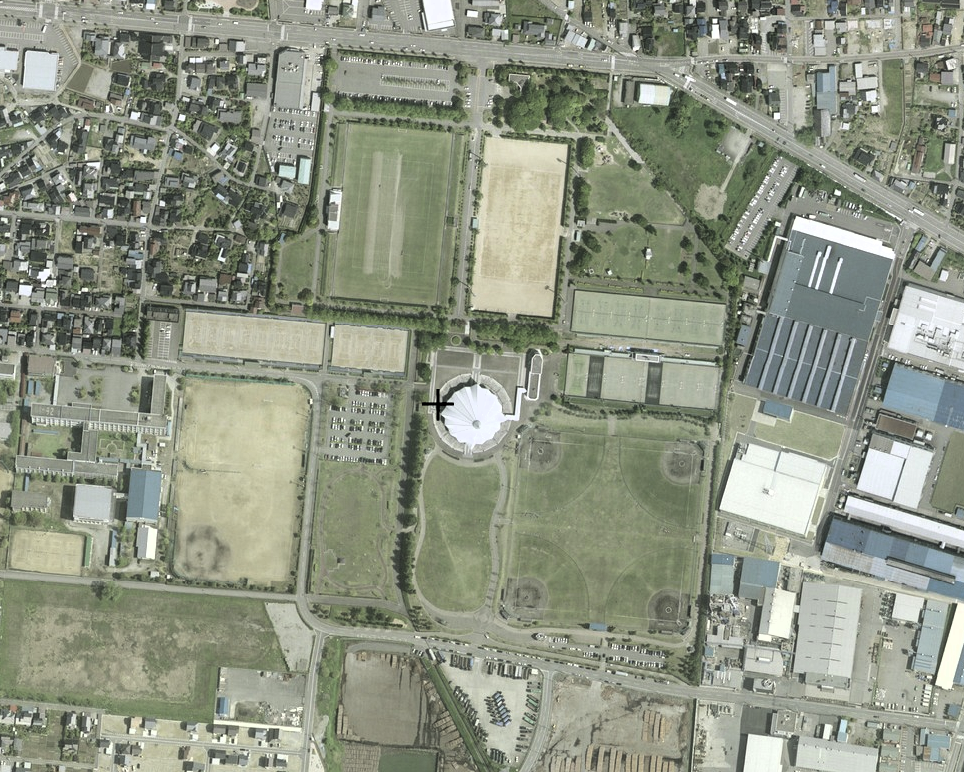
Iwase Sports Park, the club's home ground

The club was established in 1971 when the Toyama Seibu Junior High School and Toyama Technical High School alumni teams founded a new team under the name Seiyu Club. They joined the new Toyama Prefecture League in 1973, and were promoted to the Hokushinetsu Football League in 1980. After finishing bottom of the league in 1995 they were relegated to the Toyama Prefecture League.

In 1999 the club adopted its current name, which translates as "brave" in Spanish. They returned to the Hokushinetsu League in 2000, but finished bottom again in 2004 and were relegated to the league's second division. They were promoted back to the top division after winning the second division in 2006. Another relegation followed in 2011 but they were second division champions the following season and were promoted back to the first division.

The club were relegated to the second division in 2015 and finished bottom of the second division the following season, resulting in relegation to the Toyama Prefecture League. They were Toyama Prefecture League champions in 2018, but lost in the promotion play-offs.

== Honours ==
Valiente Toyama honours
| Honour | No. | Years |
|---|---|---|
| Hokushin'etsu Football League | 2 | 2006, 2012 |
| Toyama Prefecture League | 8 | 1978, 1979, 1980, 1996, 1998, 1999, 2018, 2023 |
