= NTT West Kyoto SC =

Japanese football club

NTT West Kyoto S.C.
- Full name: NTT West Kyoto Soccer Club
- Founded: 1967 (as NTT Kinki SC)
- Dissolved: 2011
- Ground: Kyoto, Japan

NTT West Kyoto Soccer Club was a Japanese football club based in Kyoto. The club played in Japan Soccer League Division 2. It last played in the Kyoto Prefectural League since 2003.

== Club name ==
- 1967–1984 : NTT Kinki SC
- 1985–1998 : NTT Kansai SC
- 1999–2011 : NTT West Kyoto SC
