= YKK AP SC =

Japanese football club

YKK AP S.C.
- Full name: YKK AP Soccer Club
- Founded: 1962; 63 years ago
- Dissolved: 2007; 18 years ago
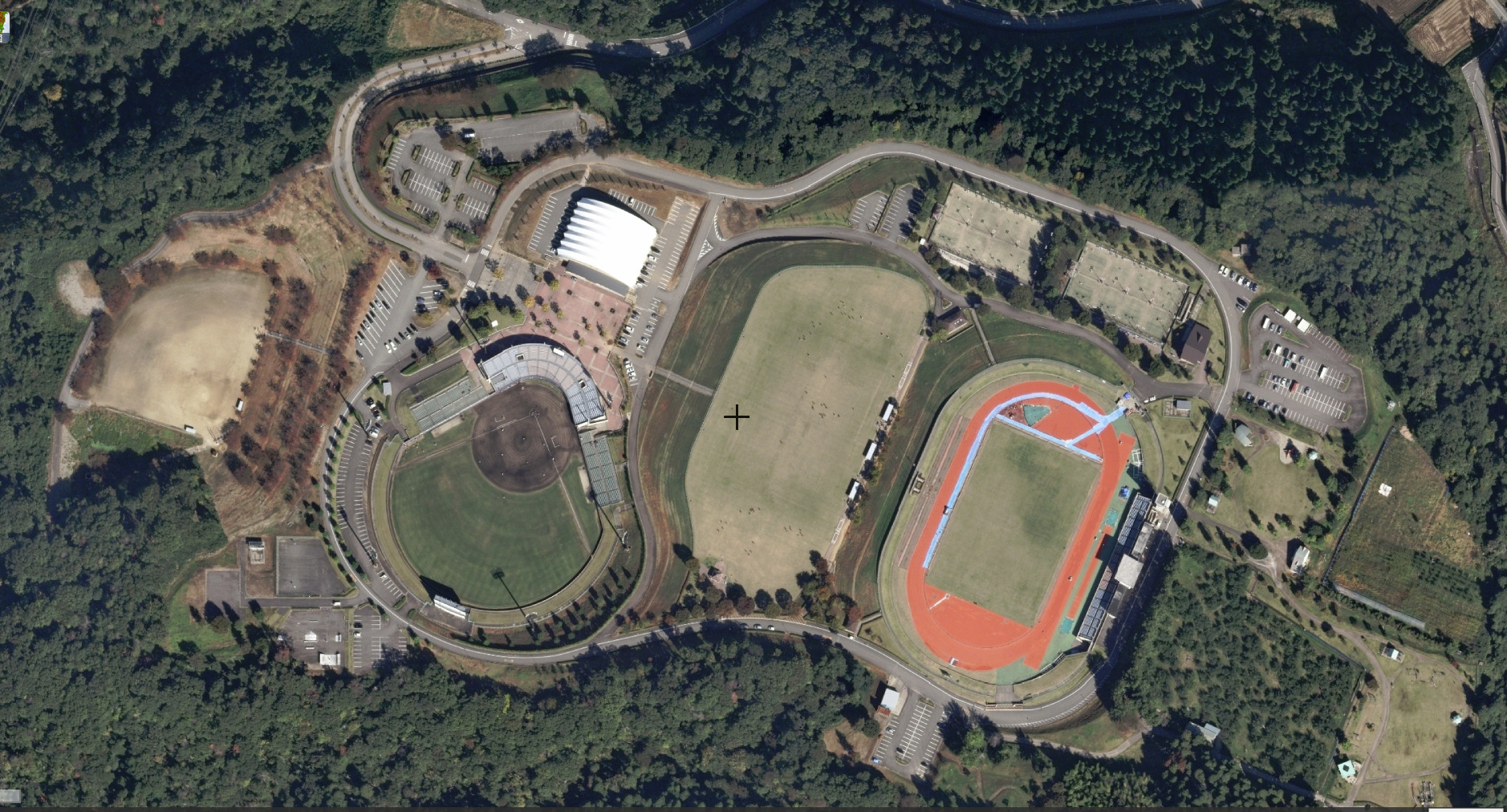
- Ground: Uozu Momoyama Sports Park Stadium
- Manager
- League: Toyama Prefectural League
Home colours	Away colours

YKK AP S.C. (YKK APサッカー部, Wai Kei Kei Ē Pī Sakkā Bu) was a Japanese football club based in Kurobe, Toyama Prefecture. The team played in the Toyama Prefectural League. Their team colour was blue. Formed in 1962 as the YKK company team, they merged with another team to create Kataller Toyama after the 2007 season. A new amateur employee team from YKK took on the old name in 2007.

== History ==
The YKK Soccer Club was founded in 1962 as the football club of the company YKK (then Yoshida Kōgyō). They won the inaugural 1972 season title of the Hokushin'etsu Regional League, and went on to win another 10 championships in the league before they were promoted to the Japan Football League (JFL) for the 2001 season. They changed their name to the current one in 2004 when YKK passed the ownership to a subsidiary company, YKK AP (YKK Architectural Products).

In the regional league, ALO's Hokuriku had been their biggest rival as the two competed for the right to participate as the representative for Toyama in Emperor's Cup.

== Merger into a professional team ==
On September 10, 2007, YKK and Hokuriku Electric Power Company, the owner of ALO's Hokuriku, agreed to merge their teams to aim for promotion to the J. League, the professional football league in Japan, in response to eager requests from the Toyama Football Association (TFA). According to local broadcasting company Tulip TV, over 20 companies informally promised to invest in the new team. The Governor of Toyama Prefecture also participated in the media briefing.

TFA founded an organization named "Civic Soccer Club Team of Toyama Prefecture (富山県民サッカークラブチーム)" with two major economic representatives from Hokuriku Electric Power Company and YKK. The JFL confirmed that the merged club would compete from the 2008 season. The new merged club was given the name Kataller Toyama.

== Amateur club ==
After the merger, YKK AP decided to reform the club as an amateur club whose players are mostly employees of YKK AP. They played in Toyama Prefectural League from 2008.

== Results in JFL ==
2001: 6th
2002: 8th
2003: 6th
2004: 4th
2005: runners-up
2006: 4th
2007: 6th
