= Toyota Industries SC =

Japanese football club

Toyota Industries S.C. 豊田自動織機製作所サッカー部
- Full name: Toyota Industries Soccer Club (formerly Toyoda Automatic Loom Works SC)
- Founded: 1946
- League: Tōkai Regional Div. 2
- 2016: 5th
- Website: http://blogs.yahoo.co.jp/shokki_soccer
Home colours	Away colours

Toyota Industries Soccer Club (豊田自動織機製作所サッカー部, - Toyota Jidō Shokki Seisakujo Sakkā Bu) is a Japanese football club based in Kariya, Aichi.

== History ==
The club was formed in 1946 under its parent company's then-official English name Toyoda Automatic Loom Works, and co-founded the original Japan Soccer League (JSL) in 1965 ("Original Eight" (Note: The Original Eight of the Japan Soccer League (JSL) in 1965 were Mitsubishi, Furukawa, Hitachi, Yanmar, Toyo Industries, Yahata Steel, Toyota Industries and Nagoya Mutual Bank.)). In the first three seasons of the league the club struggled and was relegated in 1967 when it lost a promotion/relegation series to neighbors and also JSL co-founders Nagoya Mutual Bank, who had been relegated themselves the year before and were looking to get back into the top division again. Thus, Toyota ALW took their place in the Tōkai Regional League.

In 1972, the club was given a second chance at national league stardom by co-founding the JSL's new Second Division, but finished in bottom place and was saved from relegation by the fact that the JSL was expanding to increase the First Division's size to 10. The following season they stumbled again despite finishing in 9th place and lost another promotion/relegation series, this time to Hitachi Ibaraki, a sister and de facto reserve club to the main Hitachi club at the time based in Tokyo. The 1972 season was also shared with neighbor and sister club Toyota Motors, which was promoted as champion and eventually became known as J. League powerhouse Nagoya Grampus.

Since then, the Toyoda ALW club has been going back and forth between the Tōkai Regional League and the Aichi Prefectural League, with their most recent Tōkai stint coming from promotion into the former's Division 2 in 2003 and ending with relegation to the prefectural division in 2005.

== Club Name ==
- 1946–2000: Toyoda Automatic Loom Works SC
- 2001–present: Toyota Industries SC

== League history ==
League history of Toyota Industries Soccer Club
- 1965–1967: Japan Soccer League
- 1968–1971: Tokai Regional League
- 1972–1973: Japan Soccer League Division 2
- 1974–1979: Tokai Regional League
- 1980–1991: Aichi Prefectural League Division 1
- 1992–2000: Tokai Regional League
- 2001–2003: Aichi Prefectural League Division 1
- 2004–2005: Tokai Regional League Division 2
- 2006-2013: Aichi Prefectural League Division 1
- 2014–present: Tokai Regional League Division 2

== Honours ==
=== Titles ===
- Aichi Prefectural League: 4

1986, 1991, 2003, 2013.

== See also ==
- Toyota Industries
- Toyota Industries Shuttles
