= Igosso Kochi FC =

Japanese football club

Igosso Kōchi アイゴッソ高知
- Full name: Igosso Kōchi
- Founded: 1999; 27 years ago as Nangoku Kōchi FC
- Dissolved: 2015; 11 years ago merged into Kochi United SC
- Ground: Haruno Athletic Sports Park; Kōchi, Kōchi
- Capacity: 1,000 (Main)
- Manager: Kazushi Yokoyama
- 2015: Shikoku League, 3rd of 8
Home colours	Away colours

Igosso Kōchi (アイゴッソ高知, Aigosso Kōchi) is a defunct football (soccer) club that was based in Kōchi, the capital city of Kōchi Prefecture of Japan. They last played in the Shikoku Adult League. The club was known as Nangoku Kōchi F.C. (南国高知FC). In December 2013 the club's name changed to Igosso Kochi. In January 2016, they came to an agreement with neighbouring club Kochi U Torastar FC to form a club to represent Kōchi Prefecture in the J.League. In February 2016, the two clubs established as Kōchi United SC.

== History ==
The club was founded in the post-war era as Kōchi Agricultural School OB Club (高知農業高校OBクラブ), but in 1966 the name changed to Nangoku Soccer Club (南国サッカークラブ). Since the inception of the Shikoku Adult League in 1977, this club played as a representative of Kōchi Prefecture and became one of the powerhouse clubs in the league. In 1996 because of sponsorship by Himawari Milk the club changed its name to Himawari Milk Nangoku F.C. (ひまわり牛乳南国FC). The club's name changed again in 1999 to Nangoku Kōchi F.C. (南国高知FC). The club aimed to become a community-based football club in 2002.

Nangoku Kōchi F.C. crest, used until 2013

With the introduction of J. League Division 3 in 2014, the club intended to join but decided to postpone it at the deadline submission of J.League Associate Membership in June 2013. In preparation they changed the name of the club to Igosso Kōchi (アイゴッソ高知) for the 2014 season onwards. The name Igosso is a combination of two Japanese words; ai (愛) means love and igossou (いごっそう) from Tosa dialect means "a stubborn man with fortitude".

== League record ==
Champions	Runners-up	Third place	Promoted	Relegated

Season	League	Pos.	Pld	W	D	L	Pts
1977	Shikoku League	5th	14	6	2	6	14
1978	Shikoku League	3rd	14	8	2	4	18
1979	Shikoku League	2nd	14	9	2	3	20
1980	Shikoku League	Champions	14	10	2	2	22
1981	Shikoku League	6th	14	6	2	6	14
1982	Shikoku League	5th	14	6	2	6	14
1983	Shikoku League	5th	14	6	2	6	14
1984	Shikoku League	5th	14	7	1	6	15
1985	Shikoku League	4th	14	5	2	7	12
1986	Shikoku League	4th	14	8	0	6	16
1987	Shikoku League	3rd	14	7	1	6	15
1988	Shikoku League	4th	14	7	2	5	16
1989	Shikoku League	4th	14	7	2	5	16
1990	Shikoku League	4th	14	7	2	5	16
1991	Shikoku League	4th	14	7	1	6	15
1992	Shikoku League	4th	14	5	2	7	12
1993	Shikoku League	6th	14	4	1	9	9
1994	Shikoku League	6th	13	3	1	9	7
1995	Shikoku League	6th	14	4	3	7	15
1996	Shikoku League	4th	14	5	3	6	18
1997	Shikoku League	5th	14	3	5	6	14
1998	Shikoku League	2nd	14	7	6	1	23
1999	Shikoku League	3rd	14	7	6	1	27
2000	Shikoku League	2nd	14	11	1	2	34
2001	Shikoku League	Champions	14	14	0	0	42
2002	Shikoku League	Champions	14	12	1	1	37
2003	Shikoku League	Champions	14	13	1	0	40
2004	Shikoku League	Champions	14	12	1	1	37
2005	Shikoku League	Champions	14	12	1	1	37
2006	Shikoku League	2nd	14	11	2	1	35
2007	Shikoku League	3rd	14	10	0	4	30
2008	Shikoku League	4th	14	6	2	6	20
2009	Shikoku League	5th	14	4	2	8	14
2010	Shikoku League	4th	14	5	4	5	19
2011	Shikoku League	5th	14	4	3	7	15
2012	Shikoku League	3rd	14	8	1	5	25
2013	Shikoku League	2nd	14	8	5	1	29
2014	Shikoku League	2nd	14	11	2	1	34
2015	Shikoku League	3rd	14	9	3	2	30

- Note: The 1994 season saw one game cancelled due to the disqualification of Alex SC who fielded ineligible players.

== Honours ==
- Shikoku Adult League
  - Winners (6): 1980, 2001, 2002, 2003, 2004, 2005
