= Teihens FC =

Japanese football club

Teihens
- Full name: Teihens Football Club
- Founded: 1968; 57 years ago
- Ground: Kanazawa Soccer Stadium
- Capacity: 3,010
- Chairman: Tomohiro Shimano
- Manager: Ryoji Okunaga
- League: Ishikawa Prefecture League Div.1
- 2022: 5th of 8
Home colours	Away colours

Teihens Football Club is a Japanese football club based in Ishikawa Prefecture. The club plays in the 1st division of the Ishikawa Prefecture League.

== History ==
The club was formed in 1968 by Teihei Kuwabara. They competed in the District League until 1976. During their period they made their first appearance in the Emperor's Cup. In 1977 they were promoted to the Hokushinetsu Football League.

Teihens is one of the most successful amateur clubs in Ishikawa. They won the 1991 Hokushinetsu Football League, the Ishikawa's Prefectural Cup and Prefectural League eight and four times, respectively.

== Honours ==
- Hokushinetsu Football League
  - 1991
- Ishikawa Prefectural Cup
  - 1996, 1997, 1998, 1999, 2000, 2001, 2002, 2006
- Ishikawa Prefectural League
  - 2008, 2018, 2019, 2021
