= Fujieda City Hall SC =

Japanese football club

Fujieda City Hall S.C.
- Full name: Fujieda City Hall Soccer Club
- Nickname: Wisteria
- Founded: 1959; 67 years ago
- Stadium: Fujieda Sports Park Athletic Field; Fujieda Municipal Ground
- Manager: Taiki Suzuki
- League: Tōkai Adult Soccer League Div. 1
- 2024: 6th of 8

Fujieda City Hall Soccer Club (藤枝市役所サッカー部, Fujieda Shiyakusho Sakkā-Bu) is a Japanese football club based in Fujieda, Shizuoka. The club has played in Japan Soccer League Division 2. They currently participate in Tōkai Adult League, which part of Japanese Regional Leagues.

== Current squad ==
As of 23 August 2023.

Note: Flags indicate national team as defined under FIFA eligibility rules; some limited exceptions apply. Players may hold more than one non-FIFA nationality.

No.	Pos.	Nation	Player
1	GK	JPN	Ryohei Suzuki
2	DF	JPN	Hirokazu Ando
3	DF	JPN	Shingo Nakashima
4	MF	JPN	Yuki Nagasawa
6	MF	JPN	Kohei Watanabe
7	MF	JPN	Kazuki Muramatsu
8	MF	JPN	Yutaro Shirai
9	FW	JPN	Yuki Takahashi
10	MF	JPN	Shoi Kotera
11	MF	JPN	Itsuki Tomohara
12	DF	JPN	Yuji Tsukada
13	MF	JPN	Kaito Kimura
14	FW	JPN	Kengo Akita
15	FW	JPN	Takahiro Tanio

No.	Pos.	Nation	Player
16	MF	JPN	Taisei Suzuki
17	MF	JPN	Genki Oishi
18	GK	JPN	Yu Tanaka
19	MF	JPN	Tetsu Saito
20	DF	JPN	Kohei Nonaka
21	GK	JPN	Takafumi Chishiki
22	DF	JPN	Takuma Sugiyama
23	FW	JPN	Kojiro Nakamura
24	DF	JPN	Anji Yamaguchi
25	MF	JPN	Sotaro Suzuki
26	MF	JPN	Yamato Sone
27	DF	JPN	Yusuke Akita
28	FW	JPN	Shodai Takayanagi

== Honours ==
Fujieda City Hall SC honours
Honour	No.	Years
Shizuoka Prefecture 2nd Division West	1	1972
Shizuoka Prefecture Division 1	1	1979
Tōkai Adult Soccer League Div 1	2	1980, 2001
Tōkai Adult Soccer League Div 2	1	2017

== Club officials ==
For the 2025 season.

Position	Name
Manager	(Japan) Taiki Suzuki
First-team coaches	(Japan) Daiki Suzuki (Japan) Yuji Tsukada
