= Saitama SC =

Japanese football club

Saitama S.C. さいたまSC
- Full name: Saitama S.C.
- Founded: 1953; 72 years ago
- Ground: Akibanomori Sports Park; Saitama, Saitama
- League: Kanto Soccer League (Japanese Regional Leagues
- Website: http://www.saitama-sc.net/sc/
Home colours	Away colours

Saitama S.C. (さいたまSC) is a Japanese football club playing in the Kanto Soccer League, one of the Japanese Regional Leagues. The club aims for promotion to the Japan Football League.

The club was founded in 1953 as Saitama Teachers S.C. and competed in the old Japan Soccer League Division 2 in 1982 and 1983.
