= 2021 Blaublitz Akita season =

Blaublitz Akita
2021 season
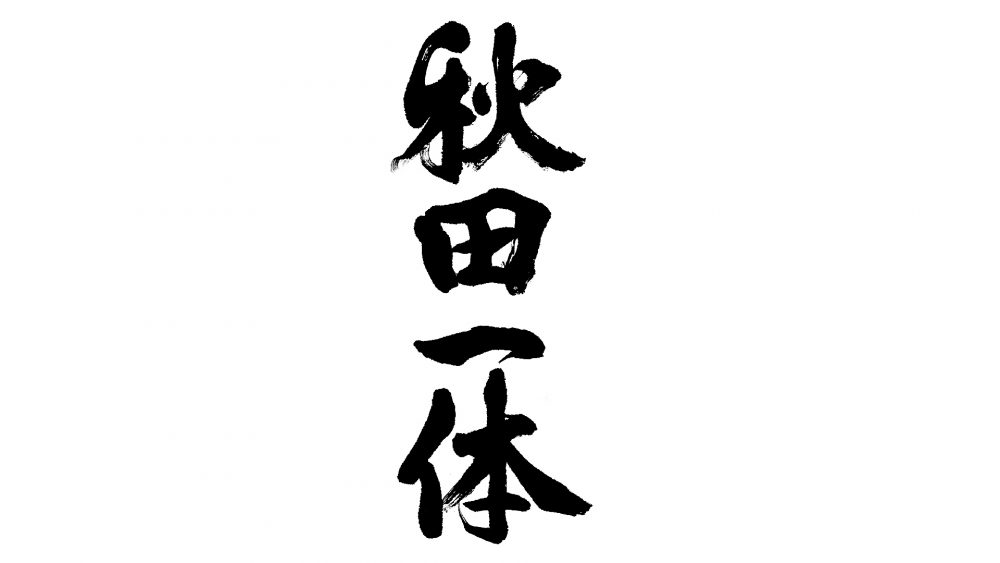
- Chairman: Kosuke Iwase
- Manager: Ken Yoshida
- Stadium: Soyu Stadium
- J2 League: 13th
- Emperor's Cup: 1st round
- Top goalscorer: Hayate Take (7)
- Highest home attendance: 3,961
- Lowest home attendance: 1,084
- Average home league attendance: 2,097
Home colours	Away colours

The 2021 season was Blaublitz Akita' s first season in the J2 League,. The annual club slogan is "秋田一体".

== Squad ==
As of 2021.

Note: Flags indicate national team as defined under FIFA eligibility rules; some limited exceptions apply. Players may hold more than one non-FIFA nationality.

No.	Pos.	Nation	Player
1	GK	JPN	Yoshiaki Arai
2	DF	JPN	Kenshiro Tanioku
3	DF	JPN	Junya Suzuki
4	DF	JPN	Mizuki Aiba
5	DF	JPN	Kaito Chida
6	MF	JPN	Yuji Wakasa
7	MF	JPN	Makoto Fukoin
8	MF	JPN	Taira Shige
9	FW	JPN	Ryota Nakamura (captain)
10	MF	JPN	Yuta Shimozawa
11	MF	JPN	Ken Hisatomi
13	FW	JPN	Ryuji Saito
14	FW	JPN	Yosuke Mikami
15	MF	JPN	Nao Eguchi
16	FW	JPN	Naoki Inoue
17	DF	JPN	Koki Shimosaka

No.	Pos.	Nation	Player
18	FW	JPN	Ibuki Yoshida
19	FW	JPN	Hayate Take
20	MF	JPN	Takuma Aoshima
21	GK	JPN	Yudai Tanaka
22	MF	JPN	Masaki Okino
23	MF	JPN	Shuto Inaba
24	DF	JPN	Naoyuki Yamada
25	MF	JPN	Tomofumi Fujiyama
27	MF	JPN	Masashi Kokubun
29	FW	JPN	Keita Saito
30	GK	JPN	Yuki Yasuda
31	GK	JPN	Ryo Hasegawa
32	DF	JPN	Shigeto Masuda
33	MF	JPN	Ryutaro Iio
39	DF	JPN	Yuko Takase
40	FW	JPN	Koya Handa
50	DF	JPN	Kenichi Kaga

== J2 League ==
Match	Date	Team	Score	Team	Venue	Attendance
1	2021.02.28	Thespakusatsu Gunma	2-1	Blaublitz Akita	Shoda Shoyu Stadium Gunma	3,415
2	2021.03.07	Tochigi SC	0-1	Blaublitz Akita	Kanseki Stadium Tochigi	3,706
3	2021.03.14	JEF Chiba	0-2	Blaublitz Akita	Fukuda Denshi Arena	3,969
4	2021.03.21	Giravanz Kitakyushu	1-1	Blaublitz Akita	Mikuni World Stadium Kitakyushu	2,491
5	2021.03.28	Blaublitz Akita	1-0	Kyoto Sanga	Soyu Stadium	3,015
6	2021.04.04	Matsumoto Yamaga	3-1	Blaublitz Akita	Sunpro Alwin	4,825
7	2021.04.10	Blaublitz Akita	0-0	Omiya Ardija	Soyu Stadium	1,738
8	2021.04.17	Blaublitz Akita	0-0	Montedio Yamagata	Soyu Stadium	1,777
9	2021.04.21	Zweigen Kanazawa	2-1	Blaublitz Akita	Ishikawa Athletics Stadium	1,426
10	2021.04.25	Blaublitz Akita	1-0	Mito HollyHock	Soyu Stadium	1,319
11	2021.05.01	Blaublitz Akita	0-1	Fagiano Okayama	Soyu Stadium	1,427
12	2021.05.05	V-Varen Nagasaki	1-2	Blaublitz Akita	Transcosmos Stadium Nagasaki	4,430
13	2021.05.09	Blaublitz Akita	1-1	Jubilo Iwata	Soyu Stadium	3,961
14	2021.05.15	Ventforet Kofu	1-0	Blaublitz Akita	JIT Recycle Ink Stadium	4,129
15	2021.05.19	Blaublitz Akita	1-1	Renofa Yamaguchi	Soyu Stadium	1,084
16	2021.05.29	Tokyo Verdy	3-1	Blaublitz Akita	Ajinomoto Stadium	2,242
17	2021.06.05	Blaublitz Akita	1-1	FC Ryukyu	Soyu Stadium	2,030
18	2021.06.13	Machida Zelvia	0-2	Blaublitz Akita	Machida GION Stadium	2,164
19	2021.06.21	Blaublitz Akita	0-2	Albirex Niigata	Soyu Stadium	3,013
20	2021.06.26	Blaublitz Akita	1-1	SC Sagamihara	Soyu Stadium	1,768
21	2021.07.04	Ehime FC	1-3	Blaublitz Akita	Ningineer Stadium	1,289
22	2021.07.11	Blaublitz Akita	1-1	JEF Chiba	Soyu Stadium	2,039
23	2021.07.17	Renofa Yamaguchi	1-0	Blaublitz Akita	Ishin Me-Life Stadium	2,848
24	2021.08.09	Blaublitz Akita	1-4	Matsumoto Yamaga	Soyu Stadium	3,703
25	2021.08.14	Omiya Ardija	1-1	Blaublitz Akita	NACK5 Stadium	3,333
26	2021.08.22	Blaublitz Akita	1-1	V-Varen Nagasaki	Soyu Stadium	1,446
27	2021.08.29	FC Ryukyu	2-1	Blaublitz Akita	Tapic Kenso Hiyagon Stadium	0
28	2021.09.04	Blaublitz Akita	1-0	Thespakusatsu Gunma	Soyu Stadium	1,389
29	2021.09.11	Mito HollyHock	0-3	Blaublitz Akita	K's denki Stadium	1,833
30	2021.09.19	Blaublitz Akita	1-1	Giravanz Kitakyushu	Soyu Stadium	2,003
31	2021.09.26	Fagiano Okayama	1-1	Blaublitz Akita	City Light Stadium	4,835
32	2021.10.02	Blaublitz Akita	0-2	Ehime FC	Soyu Stadium	1,411
33	2021.10.10	Montedio Yamagata	2-1	Blaublitz Akita	ND Soft Stadium Yamagata	6,779
34	2021.10.16	Blaublitz Akita	0-2	Machida Zelvia	Soyu Stadium	1,281
35	2021.10.23	Albirex Niigata	1-2	Blaublitz Akita	Denka Big Swan Stadium	8,662
36	2021.10.30	Blaublitz Akita	1-1	Zweigen Kanazawa	Soyu Stadium	1,868
37	2021.11.03	SC Sagamihara	0-1	Blaublitz Akita	Sagamihara Gion Stadium	2,043
38	2021.11.07	Blaublitz Akita	1-1	Tochigi SC	Soyu Stadium	2,411
39	2021.11.14	Kyoto Sanga	3-1	Blaublitz Akita	Sanga Stadium by Kyocera	9,900
40	2021.11.21	Blaublitz Akita	0-2	Ventforet Kofu	Soyu Stadium	2,664
41	2021.11.28	Blaublitz Akita	1-4	Tokyo Verdy	Soyu Stadium	2,685
42	2021.12.05	Jubilo Iwata	2-1	Blaublitz Akita	Yamaha Stadium	6,986

== Emperor's Cup ==
23 May 2021 1	Blaublitz Akita	1-1	Hokkaido Tokachi Sky Earth	Akita, Akita
13:00	Inoue 61'	Report	Nawa 36'	Stadium: Soyu Stadium; Attendance: 534; Referee: Keisuke Nobori penaltyscore = 8-9

== Other games ==
15 February 2021	Kochi United SC	v	Blaublitz Akita	Haruno Athletic Field
		Report

== Gallery ==
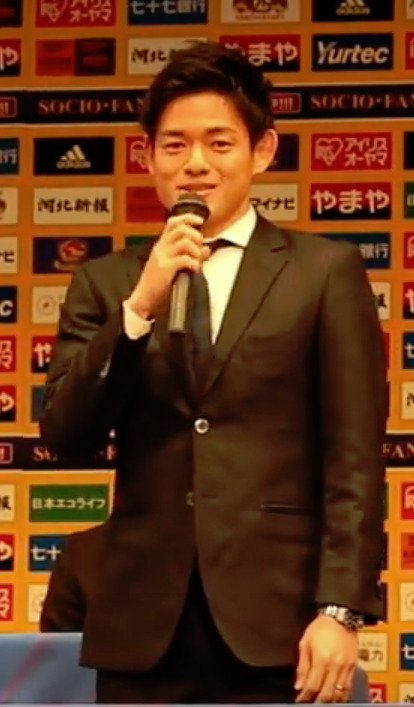
Iio
