= 2022 Blaublitz Akita season =

Blaublitz Akita
2022 season
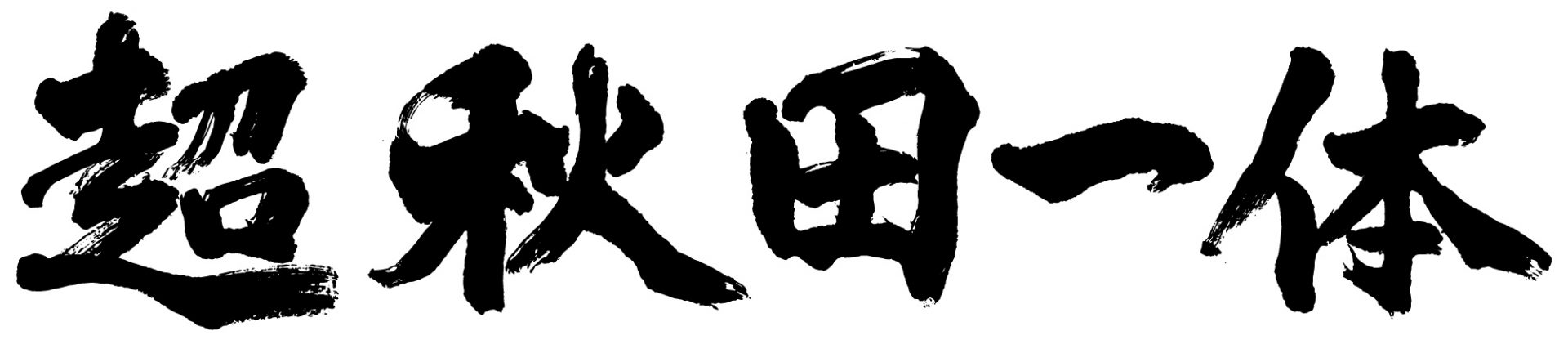
- Chairman: Kosuke Iwase
- Manager: Ken Yoshida
- Stadium: Soyu Stadium
- J2 League: 12th
- Emperor's Cup: 2nd round
- Top goalscorer: Ibuki Yoshida, Shota Aoki (5)
- Highest home attendance: 5,404
- Lowest home attendance: 954
- Average home league attendance: 2,283
Home colours	Away colours

The 2022 season was Blaublitz Akita' s second season in the J2 League,. The annual club slogan is "超秋田一体".

== Squad ==
As of 2022.

Note: Flags indicate national team as defined under FIFA eligibility rules; some limited exceptions apply. Players may hold more than one non-FIFA nationality.

No.	Pos.	Nation	Player
1	GK	JPN	Yoshiaki Arai
2	DF	JPN	Yuzuru Yoshimura
3	DF	JPN	Tatsushi Koyanagi
4	DF	JPN	Jurato Ikeda
5	DF	JPN	Kaito Chida
6	MF	JPN	Yuji Wakasa
7	MF	JPN	Makoto Fukoin
8	MF	JPN	Taira Shige
9	FW	JPN	Ryota Nakamura
10	MF	JPN	Masaki Okino
11	FW	JPN	Koya Handa
13	FW	JPN	Ryuji Saito
14	FW	JPN	Yosuke Mikami
15	MF	JPN	Nao Eguchi
16	FW	JPN	Naoki Inoue
17	DF	JPN	Koki Shimosaka
18	FW	JPN	Ibuki Yoshida

No.	Pos.	Nation	Player
19	FW	JPN	Hayate Take
20	DF	JPN	Shintaro Kato
21	GK	JPN	Yudai Tanaka
22	DF	JPN	Ryota Takada
23	MF	JPN	Shuto Inaba (captain)
24	MF	JPN	Daiki Kogure
25	MF	JPN	Tomofumi Fujiyama
27	DF	JPN	Yuto Fujita
29	FW	JPN	Keita Saito
30	GK	JPN	Yuki Yasuda
32	DF	JPN	Shigeto Masuda
33	MF	JPN	Ryutaro Iio
39	DF	JPN	Yuko Takase
40	FW	JPN	Shota Aoki
41	GK	JPN	Kenya Matsui
45	MF	JPN	Hinase Suzuki ^{Type 2}
46	MF	JPN	Yuya Otomo ^{Type 2}
50	DF	JPN	Kenichi Kaga

== J2 League ==
Match	Date	Team	Score	Team	Venue	Attendance
1	2022.02.19	Tochigi SC	1-0	Blaublitz Akita	Kanseki Stadium Tochigi	2,956
2	2022.02.27	Renofa Yamaguchi	2-0	Blaublitz Akita	Ishin Me-Life Stadium	2,890
3	2022.03.06	Mito HollyHock	0-1	Blaublitz Akita	K's denki Stadium	2.504
4	2022.03.13	Blaublitz Akita	1-0	Albirex Niigata	Soyu Stadium	1,976
5	2022.03.19	Blaublitz Akita	2-3	Zweigen Kanazawa	Soyu Stadium	963
6	2022.03.23	Tokushima Vortis	0-0	Blaublitz Akita	Pocarisweat Stadium	2,367
7	2022.03.30	Blaublitz Akita	0-0	Ventforet Kofu	Soyu Stadium	1,308
8	2022.04.03	Blaublitz Akita	3-1	Grulla Morioka	Soyu Stadium	1,903
9	2022.04.10	Montedio Yamagata	5-1	Blaublitz Akita	ND Soft Stadium Yamagata	5,722
10	2022.04.17	Blaublitz Akita	0-1	V-Varen Nagasaki	Soyu Stadium	1,697
11	2022.04.24	Thespakusatsu Gunma	0-1	Blaublitz Akita	Shoda Shoyu Stadium Gunma	1,926
12	2022.04.27	Blaublitz Akita	0-1	Fagiano Okayama	Soyu Stadium	954
13	2022.05.01	Vegalta Sendai	3-1	Blaublitz Akita	Yurtec Stadium Sendai	9,612
14	2022.05.04	Blaublitz Akita	2-1	FC Ryukyu	Soyu Stadium	2,019
15	2022.05.08	Blaublitz Akita	1-0	Yokohama FC	Soyu Stadium	3,469
16	2022.05.15	JEF United	0-1	Blaublitz Akita	Fukuda Denshi Arena	4.463
17	2022.05.21	Blaublitz Akita	3-3	Tokyo Verdy	Soyu Stadium	2,130
18	2022.05.25	Oita Trinita	1-1	Blaublitz Akita	Showa Denko Dome Oita	3,543
19	2022.05.29	Machida Zelvia	2-0	Blaublitz Akita	Machida GION Stadium	3,213
20	2022.06.05	Blaublitz Akita	2-2	Roasso Kumamoto	Soyu Stadium	2,111
21	2022.06.12	Blaublitz Akita	0-1	Omiya Ardija	Soyu Stadium	2,296
22	2022.06.19	Albirex Niigata	3-0	Blaublitz Akita	Big Swan Stadium	13,922
23	2022.06.25	V-Varen Nagasaki	0-0	Blaublitz Akita	Transcosmos Stadium Nagasaki	4,001
24	2022.07.02	Blaublitz Akita	0-1	Renofa Yamaguchi	Soyu Stadium	2,015
25	2022.07.06	Yokohama FC	1-1	Blaublitz Akita	Mitsuzawa Stadium	2,521
26	2022.07.10	Ventforet Kofu	3-1	Blaublitz Akita	JIT Recycle Ink Stadium	4,583
27	2022.07.17	Blaublitz Akita	0-2	Montedio Yamagata	Soyu Stadium	5,206
28	2022.07.23	Omiya Ardija	0-0	Blaublitz Akita	Nack5 Stadium Omiya	4,903
29	2022.07.31	Zweigen Kanazawa	0-3	Blaublitz Akita	Ishikawa Athletics Stadium	2,182
30	2022.08.07	Blaublitz Akita	1-1	Mito HollyHock	Soyu Stadium	2,188
31	2022.08.13	Grulla Morioka	0-1	Blaublitz Akita	Iwagin Stadium	1,542
32	2022.08.20	Blaublitz Akita	0-3	Tochigi SC	Soyu Stadium	1,762
33	2022.08.28	Blaublitz Akita	0-1	Oita Trinita	Soyu Stadium	1,723
34	2022.09.03	FC Ryukyu	0-1	Blaublitz Akita	Tapic Kenso Hiyagon Stadium	608
35	2022.09.10	Blaublitz Akita	0-0	Tokushima Vortis	Soyu Stadium	1,819
36	2022.09.14	Tokyo Verdy	0-2	Blaublitz Akita	Ajinomoto Stadium	1,863
37	2022.09.18	Blaublitz Akita	0-1	Thespakusatsu Gunma	Soyu Stadium	1,982
38	2022.09.25	Blaublitz Akita	2-1	Machida Zelvia	Soyu Stadium	2,371
39	2022.10.02	Roasso Kumamoto	1-2	Blaublitz Akita	Egao Kenko Stadium	5,428
40	2022.10.08	Blaublitz Akita	3-0	JEF United Chiba	Soyu Stadium	2,656
41	2022.10.16	Fagiano Okayama	1-2	Blaublitz Akita	City Light Stadium	12,570
42	2022.10.23	Blaublitz Akita	0-0	Vegalta Sendai	Soyu Stadium	5,404

== Emperor's Cup ==
1 June 2022 Match 26	Tokyo Verdy	2−1	Blaublitz Akita	Chōfu, Tokyo
19:00 JST	Sato 7'; Nduka 31'	Report	Kogure 1'	Stadium: Ajinomoto Stadium; Attendance: 1,053; Referee: Yoshikazu Matsuzawa

== Gallery ==
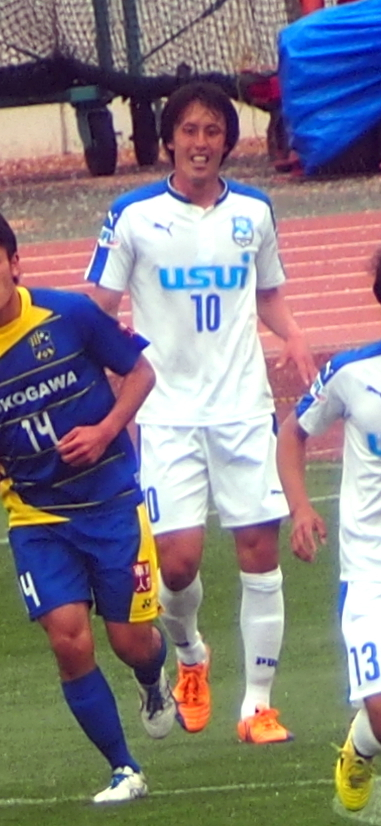
Aoki

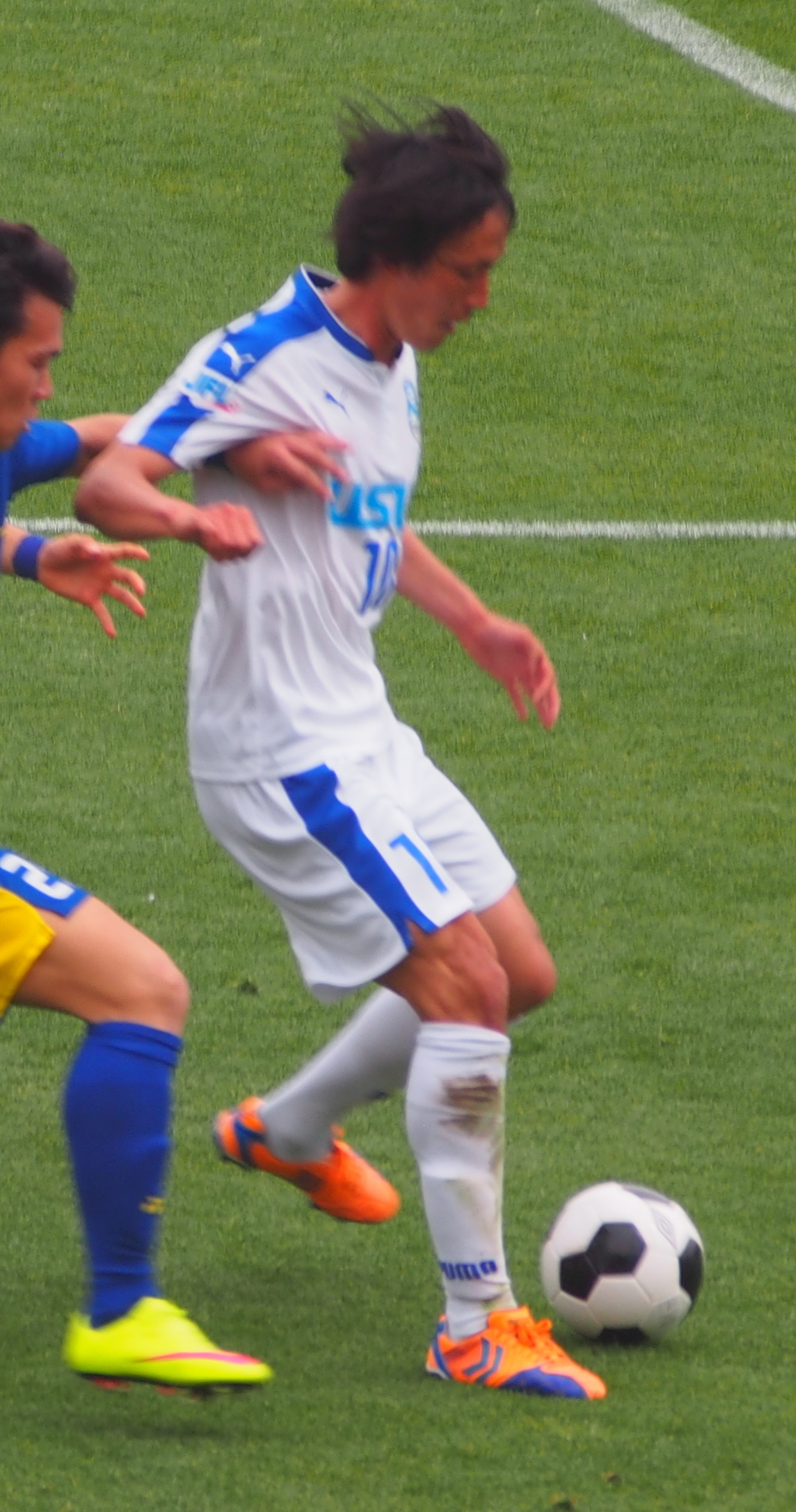
Aoki
