= 2018 Blaublitz Akita season =

Blaublitz Akita
2018 season
- Chairman: Kosuke Iwase
- Manager: Koichi Sugiyama; Shuichi Mase
- Stadium: Akigin Stadium; Akita Yabase Athletic Field
- J3 League: 8th
- Emperor's Cup: First round
- Top goalscorer: Tomohiro Tanaka (6); Ken Hisatomi (6)
- Highest home attendance: 11,802
- Lowest home attendance: 831
- Average home league attendance: 2,839 (+20.1%)
| Home colours | Away colours |

2018 Blaublitz Akita season. The annual club slogan was "志 ". Former manager Shuichi Mase replaced Sugiyama on July 12.

== Squad ==
As of 2018.

Note: Flags indicate national team as defined under FIFA eligibility rules; some limited exceptions apply. Players may hold more than one non-FIFA nationality.

| No. | Pos. | Nation | Player |
|---|---|---|---|
| 1 | GK | JPN | Keiki Shimizu |
| 2 | DF | JPN | Kei Omoto |
| 3 | DF | JPN | Shuhei Hotta |
| 4 | DF | JPN | Shuhei Fukai |
| 5 | DF | JPN | Kaito Chida |
| 6 | MF | JPN | Tomofumi Fujiyama |
| 7 | MF | JPN | Kyohei Maeyama |
| 8 | MF | JPN | Keita Hidaka |
| 9 | FW | JPN | Ryota Nakamura |
| 10 | MF | JPN | Hiroyuki Furuta |
| 11 | MF | JPN | Ken Hisatomi |
| 13 | MF | JPN | Naoto Hiraishi |

| No. | Pos. | Nation | Player |
|---|---|---|---|
| 14 | MF | JPN | Itsuki Yamada |
| 15 | MF | JPN | Nao Eguchi |
| 16 | FW | JPN | Masaya Yuma |
| 17 | DF | KOR | Han Ho-gang |
| 18 | FW | JPN | Yoshihito Fujita |
| 19 | FW | JPN | Tsubasa Yoshihira |
| 20 | MF | JPN | Takuma Aoshima |
| 21 | GK | JPN | Takuya Matsumoto |
| 22 | DF | JPN | Jun Sonoda |
| 23 | GK | JPN | Fumiya Oishi |
| 24 | DF | JPN | Naoyuki Yamada |
| 29 | FW | JPN | Tomohiro Tanaka |
| 30 | MF | JPN | Ryo Toyama |

== J3 League ==
| Match | Date | Team | Score | Team | Venue | Attendance |
| 1 | 2018.03.10 | Cerezo Osaka U-23 | 0-1 | Blaublitz Akita | Yanmar Stadium Nagai | 1,013 |
| 2 | 2018.03.17 | Thespakusatsu Gunma | 1-0 | Blaublitz Akita | Shoda Shoyu Stadium Gunma | 3,802 |
| 3 | 2018.03.21 | Gamba Osaka U-23 | 2-1 | Blaublitz Akita | Panasonic Stadium Suita | 1,224 |
| 4 | 2018.03.25 | Blaublitz Akita | 0-1 | Fukushima United FC | Akita Yabase Athletic Field | 11,802 |
| 5 | 2018.04.01 | Blaublitz Akita | 2-0 | YSCC Yokohama | Akigin Stadium | 1,971 |
| 6 | 2018.04.08 | Grulla Morioka | 2-1 | Blaublitz Akita | Iwagin Stadium | 955 |
| 7 | 2018.04.15 | Blaublitz Akita | 1-0 | Azul Claro Numazu | Akigin Stadium | 831 |
| 8 | 2018.04.29 | Kataller Toyama | 1-4 | Blaublitz Akita | Toyama Stadium | 3,043 |
| 9 | 2018.05.03 | Blaublitz Akita | 1-0 | Giravanz Kitakyushu | Akigin Stadium | 1,913 |
| 10 | 2018.05.06 | FC Ryukyu | 0-0 | Blaublitz Akita | Okinawa Athletic Park Stadium | 1,791 |
| 11 | 2018.05.20 | Blaublitz Akita | 1-2 | AC Nagano Parceiro | Akigin Stadium | 2,791 |
| 12 | 2018.06.02 | Gainare Tottori | 2-0 | Blaublitz Akita | Tottori Bank Bird Stadium | 1,302 |
| 13 | 2018.06.10 | Blaublitz Akita | 0-0 | FC Tokyo U-23 | Akigin Stadium | 2,811 |
| 14 | 2018.06.16 | Fujieda MYFC | 0-1 | Blaublitz Akita | Fujieda Soccer Stadium | 891 |
| 15 | 2018.06.24 | Blaublitz Akita | 1-1 | Kagoshima United FC | Akigin Stadium | 2,007 |
| 17 | 2018.07.08 | Blaublitz Akita | 1-2 | SC Sagamihara | Akigin Stadium | 2,391 |
| 18 | 2018.07.16 | Blaublitz Akita | 0-1 | FC Ryukyu | Akigin Stadium | 1,831 |
| 19 | 2018.07.22 | AC Nagano Parceiro | 1-2 | Blaublitz Akita | Nagano U Stadium | 7,082 |
| 20 | 2018.08.26 | Blaublitz Akita | 4-0 | Fujieda MYFC | Akigin Stadium | 1,625 |
| 21 | 2018.09.02 | Blaublitz Akita | 2-1 | Grulla Morioka | Akigin Stadium | 2,461 |
| 22 | 2018.09.08 | SC Sagamihara | 0-1 | Blaublitz Akita | Sagamihara Gion Stadium | 4,612 |
| 23 | 2018.09.15 | Blaublitz Akita | 2-2 | Gainare Tottori | Akigin Stadium | 2,777 |
| 24 | 2018.09.23 | Blaublitz Akita | 1-1 | Gamba Osaka U-23 | Akita Yabase Athletic Field | 3,418 |
| 25 | 2018.09.29 | Kagoshima United FC | 2-2 | Blaublitz Akita | Shiranami Stadium | 1,703 |
| 26 | 2018.10.07 | Blaublitz Akita | 0-1 | Thespakusatsu Gunma | Akigin Stadium | 2,211 |
| 27 | 2018.10.14 | FC Tokyo U-23 | 1-0 | Blaublitz Akita | Yumenoshima Stadium | 1,431 |
| 29 | 2018.10.28 | YSCC Yokohama | 3-1 | Blaublitz Akita | NHK Spring Mitsuzawa Football Stadium | 1,147 |
| 30 | 2018.11.04 | Blaublitz Akita | 1-4 | Cerezo Osaka U-23 | Akita Yabase Athletic Field | 2,032 |
| 31 | 2018.11.11 | Giravanz Kitakyushu | 0-2 | Blaublitz Akita | Mikuni World Stadium Kitakyushu | 4,509 |
| 32 | 2018.11.18 | Blaublitz Akita | 2-2 | Kataller Toyama | Akigin Stadium | 2,548 |
| 33 | 2018.11.25 | Fukushima United FC | 0-2 | Blaublitz Akita | Toho Stadium | 2,416 |
| 34 | 2018.12.02 | Azul Claro Numazu | 2-0 | Blaublitz Akita | Ashitaka Park Stadium | 5,215 |

=== Standings ===
| Pos | Team | Pld | W | D | L | GF | GA | GD | Pts | Promotion |
|---|---|---|---|---|---|---|---|---|---|---|
| 1 | FC Ryukyu (C, P) | 32 | 20 | 6 | 6 | 70 | 40 | +30 | 66 | Promotion to 2019 J2 League (Note: Only teams that hold a J2 license are eligible for promotion.) |
| 2 | Kagoshima United (P) | 32 | 16 | 9 | 7 | 46 | 35 | +11 | 57 | Promotion to 2019 J2 League |
| 3 | Gainare Tottori | 32 | 15 | 8 | 9 | 61 | 47 | +14 | 53 | |
| 4 | Azul Claro Numazu | 32 | 14 | 10 | 8 | 40 | 29 | +11 | 52 | |
| 5 | Thespakusatsu Gunma | 32 | 15 | 7 | 10 | 37 | 35 | +2 | 52 | |
| 6 | Gamba Osaka U-23 | 32 | 13 | 8 | 11 | 53 | 43 | +10 | 47 | |
| 7 | Cerezo Osaka U-23 | 32 | 13 | 7 | 12 | 47 | 36 | +11 | 46 | |
| 8 | Blaublitz Akita | 32 | 12 | 7 | 13 | 37 | 35 | +2 | 43 | |
| 9 | SC Sagamihara | 32 | 12 | 6 | 14 | 42 | 53 | −11 | 42 | |
| 10 | Nagano Parceiro | 32 | 10 | 11 | 11 | 39 | 37 | +2 | 41 | |
| 11 | Kataller Toyama | 32 | 12 | 5 | 15 | 41 | 50 | −9 | 41 | |
| 12 | Fukushima United | 32 | 9 | 13 | 10 | 36 | 43 | −7 | 40 | |
| 13 | Grulla Morioka | 32 | 12 | 4 | 16 | 41 | 56 | −15 | 40 | |
| 14 | FC Tokyo U-23 | 32 | 10 | 6 | 16 | 38 | 45 | −7 | 36 | |
| 15 | YSCC Yokohama | 32 | 8 | 10 | 14 | 40 | 48 | −8 | 34 | |
| 16 | Fujieda MYFC | 32 | 10 | 4 | 18 | 32 | 48 | −16 | 34 | |
| 17 | Giravanz Kitakyushu | 32 | 6 | 9 | 17 | 22 | 42 | −20 | 27 | |

Source: 2018 MEIJI YASUDA J3 LEAGUE League table
Rules for classification: 1) Points; 2) Goal difference; 3) Goals scored; 4th) head-to-head results; 5th) disciplinary points; 6th) draw
(C) Champions; (P) Promoted

== Emperor's Cup ==
| 22 April 2018 Akita Prefecture Qualifying Final | Blaublitz Akita | 1–0 | Saruta Kōgyō S.C. [tl] | Akigin Stadium |
| 14:00 | Yoshihira 29' | Report | | Attendance: 602 |

| 27 May 2018 | Blaublitz Akita | 0–1 | Vonds Ichihara | Akita Yabase Athletic Field, Akita |
| 13:00 | | Report | Mihara 47' | Attendance: 506; Referee: Nozomu Nagata |

== Other games ==
| 25 February 2018 | Shonan Bellmare | 2–3 | Blaublitz Akita | Banyu Soccer Field |
| 10:30 | | Report |

| 3 March 2018 | Blaublitz Akita | 1–2 | Iwaki FC | TDK Akita General Sports Center |
| 14:00 | | Report |

| 11 March 2018 | Blaublitz Akita | 1–2 | Japan Soccer College | TDK Akita General Sports Center |
| 14:30 | | Report |

| 5 August 2018 | Blaublitz Akita | 28–0 | North Asia University | Space Project Dream Field |
| | | Report |

| 12 August 2018 | Montedio Yamagata | 0–4 | Blaublitz Akita | #3 Sports Square |
| | | Report | Fujita; Chida; Toyama; I.Yamada |

| 15 August 2018 | Blaublitz Akita | 1–0 | ReinMeer Aomori | Akigin Stadium |
| | | Report |

| 19 August 2018 | Blaublitz Akita | 3–1 | Vanraure Hachinohe | TDK Akita General Sports Center |
| | | Report |

| 16 September 2018 | Blaublitz Akita | 11–1 | Yamagata University | Nikaho Green Field |
| | | Report |

| 21 October 2018 | Blaublitz Akita | 9–2 | Blancdieu Hirosaki FC | Akigin Stadium |
| | | Report |

== Gallery ==
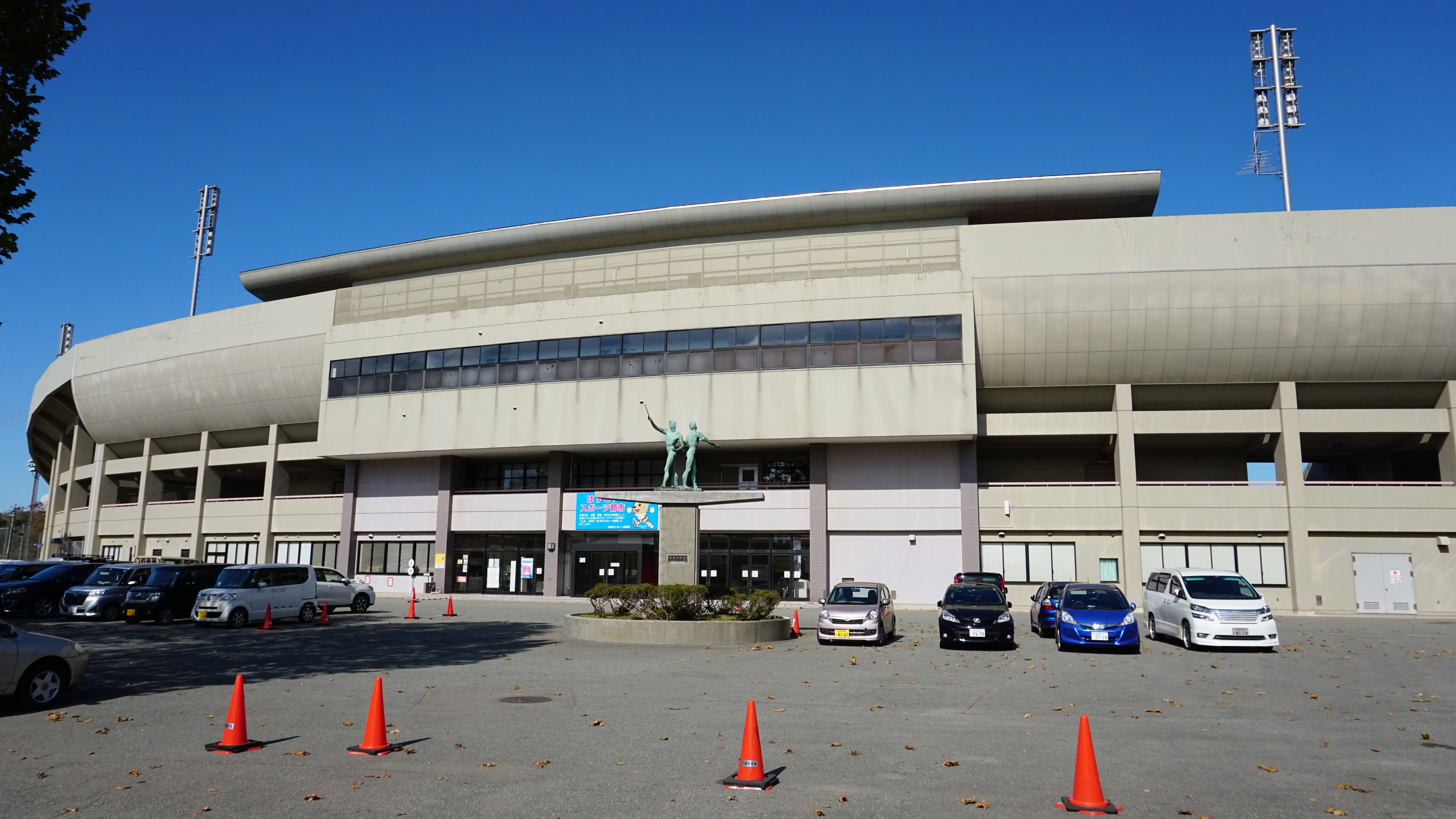
Yabase Athletic Field in 2018

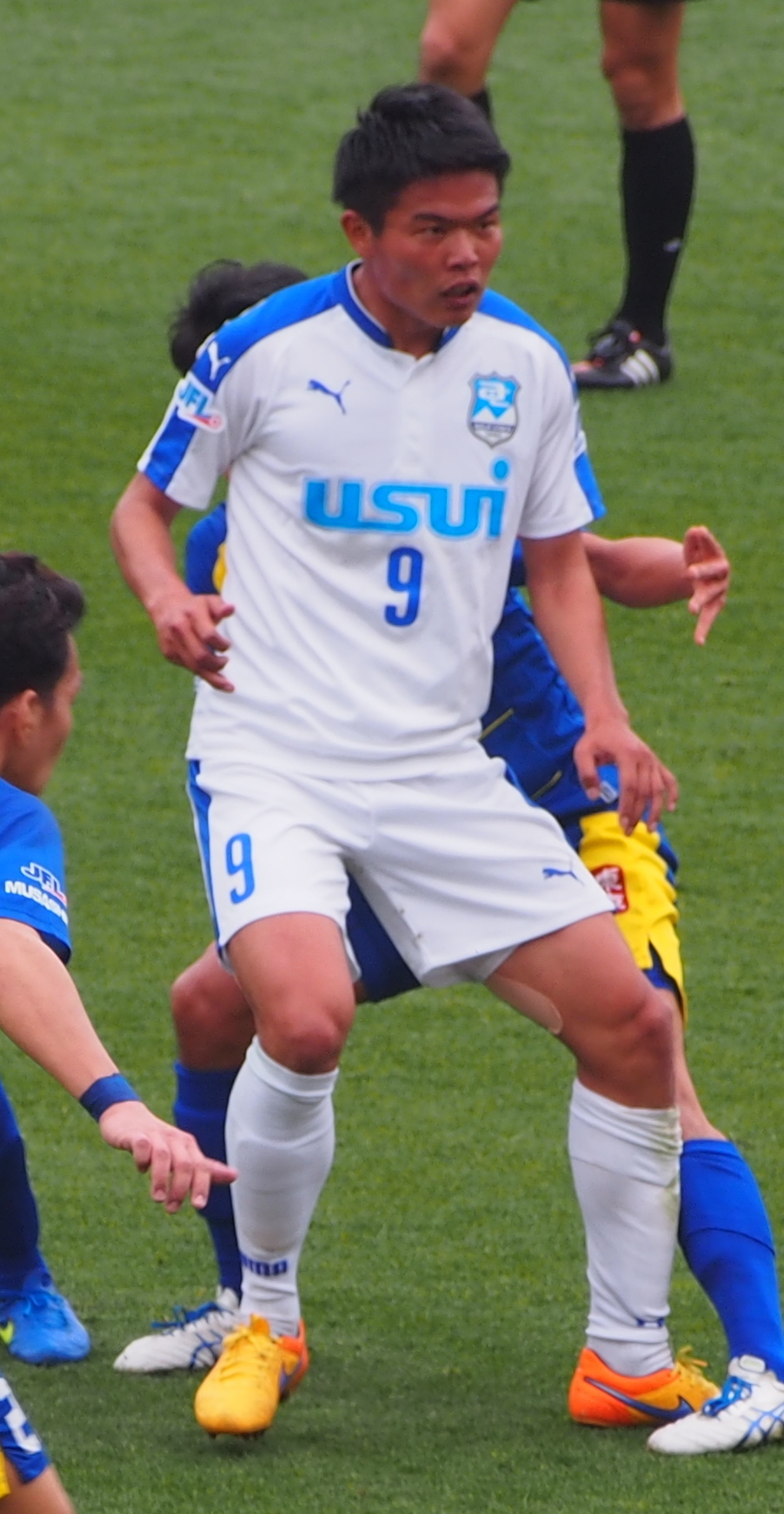
Ryota Nakamura

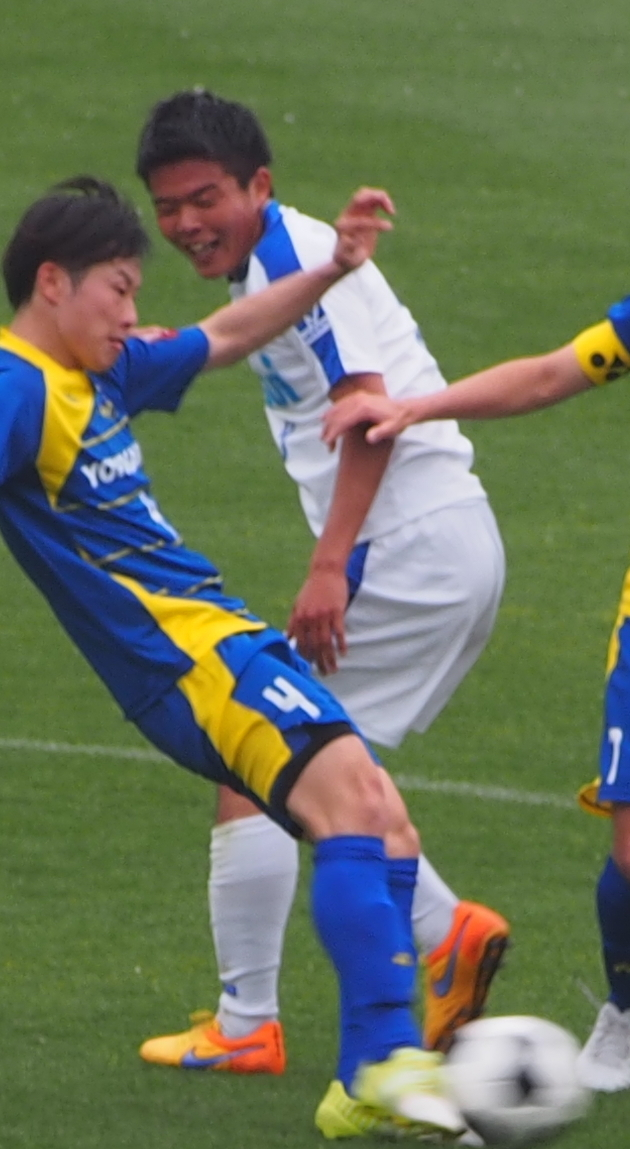
Ryota Nakamura

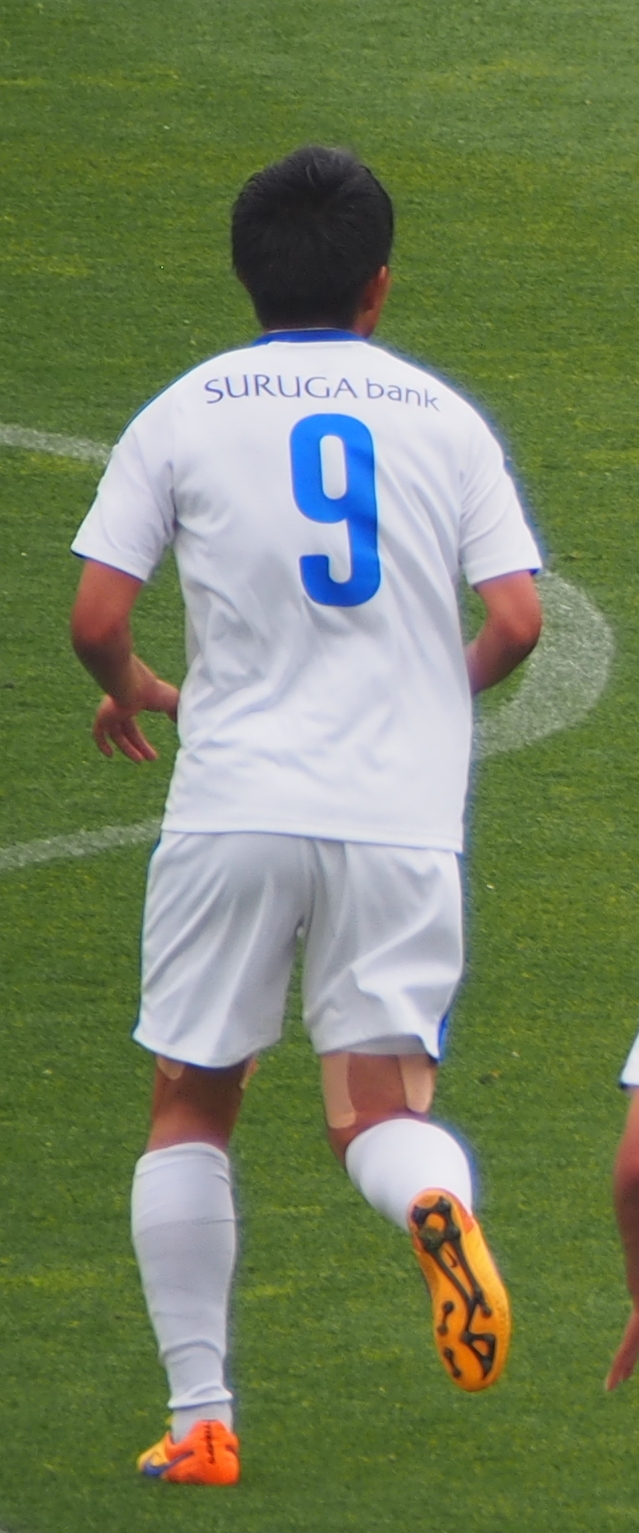
Azuki

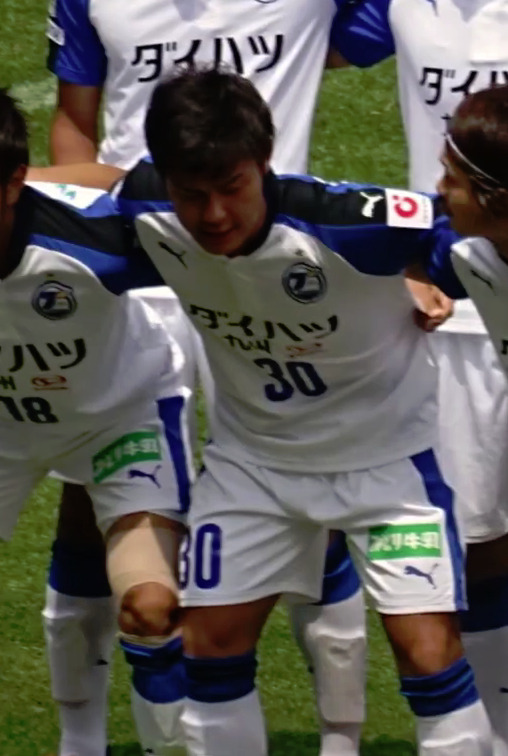
Yoshihira

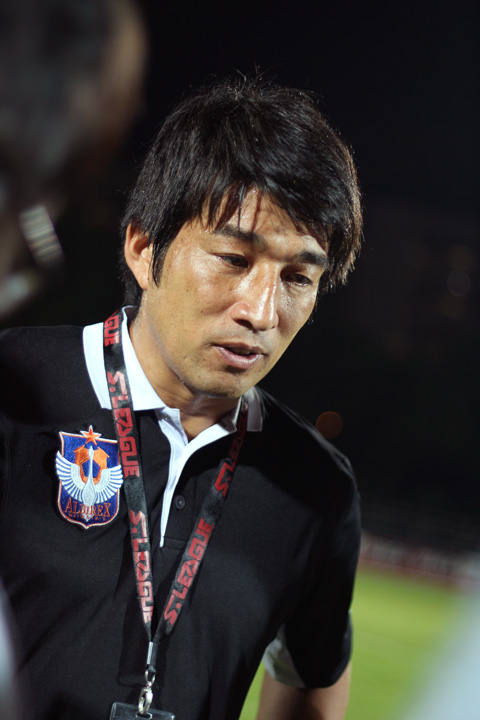
Sugiyama
