= Tomofumi Fujiyama =

Japanese footballer

Tomofumi Fujiyama 藤山 智史
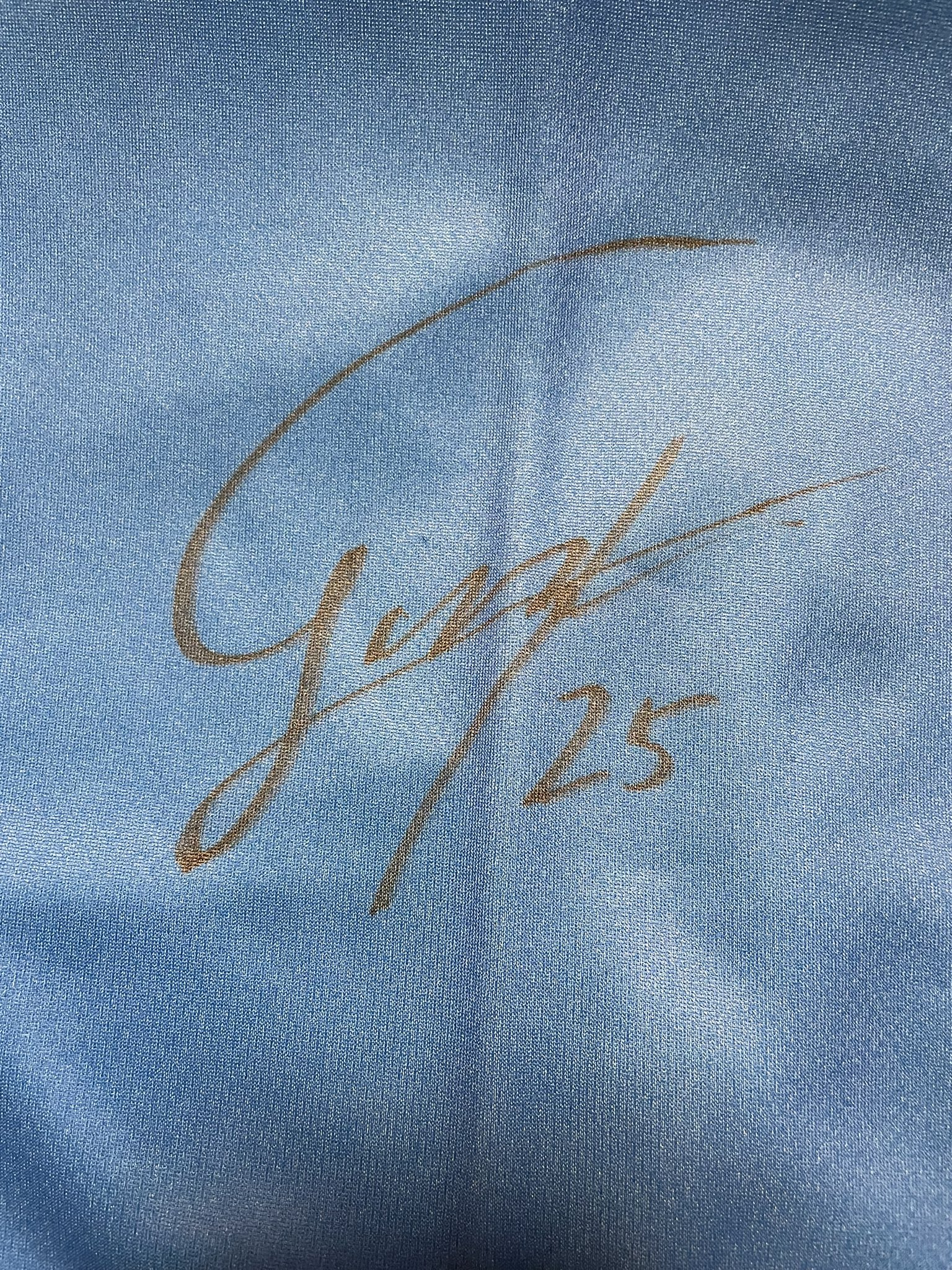

Personal information
- Full name: Tomofumi Fujiyama
- Date of birth: April 23, 1994 (age 32)
- Place of birth: Ueno, Iga, Mie, Japan
- Height: 1.68 m (5 ft 6 in)
- Position: Midfielder

Team information
- Current team: Blaublitz Akita
- Number: 25

Youth career
- Futaba SSS
- –2009: Iga FC
- 2010–2012: Yokkaichi Chuo Kogyo High School

College career
| Years | Team | Apps | (Gls) |
| 2013–2016 | NIFS Kanoya | | |

Senior career*
| Years | Team | Apps | (Gls) |
| 2017–2019 | Blaublitz Akita | 75 | (5) |
| 2020–2021 | Nagano Parceiro | 47 | (1) |
| 2021– | Blaublitz Akita | 149 | (5) |
- * Club domestic league appearances and goals as of 14 August 2026

Tomofumi Fujiyama (藤山 智史, Fujiyama Tomofumi; born April 23, 1994) is a Japanese footballer who plays as a midfielder for J2 League club Blaublitz Akita.

== Career ==
Fujiyama was born in Iga, Mie which is famous for its Ninja. He joined J3 League club Blaublitz Akita in 2017. Fujiyama made his first league appearance on 12 March, starting in the opening match against Giravanz Kitakyushu, a 1–1 draw. He scored his first goal for Akita in a 3-1 win over Cerezo Osaka U-23 on 19 March. Eventually, Akita won the J3 championship this year. In 2018 season he netted two goals and created four assists. However his time at Akita was marred by career threatening knee injury, causing him to miss half of the 2019 season. Fujiyama ended his third season having played 14 times in all competitions, including 14 league starts, scoring 2 goals. After three seasons with the club, Fujiyama joined Nagano Parceiro in 2020, and recorded 3 assists in his fourth season. He gave Nagano the lead in the 42nd minute against Kawasaki Frontale in the 2021 Emperor's Cup second round, and hit a goal once in the regular season matchup. He returned to Akita in July 2021, and crossed a ball to Hayate Take on 11 September. A ninja man bagged two goals in his 7th season, and chalked up a headed goal in 2023.

== Club statistics ==
Updated to 2 December 2022.

| Club performance | | | League | | Cup | | Total | |
| Season | Club | League | Apps | Goals | Apps | Goals | Apps | Goals |
| Japan | | | League | | Emperor's Cup | | Total | |
|---|---|---|---|---|---|---|---|---|
| 2013 | Kanoya | - | 0 | 0 | 1 | 0 | 1 | 0 |
| 2017 | Blaublitz Akita | J3 League | 31 | 1 | 0 | 0 | 31 | 1 |
| 2018 | Blaublitz Akita | J3 League | 30 | 2 | 0 | 0 | 30 | 2 |
| 2019 | Blaublitz Akita | J3 League | 14 | 2 | 0 | 0 | 14 | 2 |
| 2020 | Nagano Parceiro | J3 League | 33 | 0 | - | | 33 | 0 |
| 2021 | Nagano Parceiro | J3 League | 14 | 1 | 2 | 1 | 16 | 2 |
| 2021 | Blaublitz Akita | J2 League | 16 | 0 | - | | 16 | 0 |
| 2022 | Blaublitz Akita | J2 League | 31 | 2 | 0 | 0 | 31 | 2 |
| 2023 | Blaublitz Akita | J2 League | 0 | 0 | 0 | 0 | 0 | 0 |
| Total | | | 169 | 8 | 3 | 1 | 172 | 9 |

== Honours ==
Blaublitz Akita

- J3 League (1): 2017
