= Shimozawa =

Shimozawa is a Japanese surname. Notable people with the surname include:

- Kan Shimozawa (1892–1968), Japanese novelist
- Saki Shimozawa, a Japanese women's silver medal winner in Ice hockey at the 2011 Asian Winter Games
- Yuta Shimozawa (born 1997), Japanese footballer
