= Shintaro Kato =

Japanese footballer

Shintaro Kato 加藤慎太郎
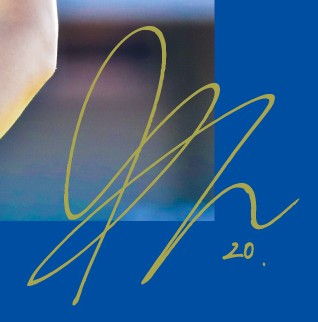

Personal information
- Date of birth: 18 October 1999 (age 27)
- Place of birth: Edogawa, Tokyo
- Height: 1.91 m (6 ft 3 in)
- Position: Defender

Team information
- Current team: Vanraure Hachinohe
- Number: 19

Youth career
- Friendly SC
- –2017: Mitsubishi Yowa

College career
Years	Team	Apps	(Gls)
2018–2021	Senshu University		

Senior career*
Years	Team	Apps	(Gls)
2022–2025	Blaublitz Akita	3	(0)
2023–2024	→ Vanraure Hachinohe (loan)	41	(4)
2025–	→ Vanraure Hachinohe (loan)	1	(0)
2025	→ FC Gifu (loan)	14	(1)

International career^{‡}
2018	Japan U-19		
- * Club domestic league appearances and goals as of 28 January 2026 ‡ National team caps and goals as of 2 December 2022 (UTC)

Shintaro Kato (加藤慎太郎, Kato Shintaro; born 18 October 1999) is a Japanese footballer currently playing as a defender for Vanraure Hachinohe.

== Career ==
Kato was born in Edogawa, Tokyo on 18 October 1999. He began playing football competitively at age 3 and had belonged to the local junior youth team at Mitsubishi Yowa. After graduating from Senshu University, he joined J2 League club Blaublitz Akita in 2022.

In April, he debuted against Fagiano Okayama as a substitute centre-back.

He netted his first professional headed goal in the Nambu derby on 14 May 2023.

== Career statistics ==
=== Club ===
As of 25 November 2022.

Club	Season	League			National Cup		League Cup		Other		Total	
Club	Season	Division	Apps	Goals	Apps	Goals	Apps	Goals	Apps	Goals	Apps	Goals
Blaublitz Akita	2022	J2 League	3	0	1	0	–		0	0	4	0
Vanraure Hachinohe	2023	J3 League	0	0	0	0	–		0	0	0	0
Career total			3	0	1	0	0	0	0	0	4	0
