= Yuto Fujita =

Japanese footballer (born 1999)

Yuto Fujita 藤田雄士
Personal information
- Date of birth: 23 August 1999 (age 27)
- Place of birth: Fujisawa, Kanagawa
- Height: 1.70 m (5 ft 7 in)
- Position: Defender

Team information
- Current team: FC Osaka
- Number: 32

Youth career
- 2016–2018: Ichiritsu Funabashi High School

College career
Years	Team	Apps	(Gls)
2019–2022	Kanagawa University		

Senior career*
Years	Team	Apps	(Gls)
2022–2023	Blaublitz Akita	7	(0)
2024–	FC Osaka	3	(0)
- * Club domestic league appearances and goals as of 30 March 2024

Yuto Fujita (藤田雄士, Fujita Yuto; born 23 August 1999) is a Japanese footballer who plays as a defender for J2 League club FC Osaka.

== Career statistics ==
As of 25 November 2022

Appearances and goals by club, season and competition
Club	Season	League			National cup		League cup		Other		Total	
Club	Season	Division	Apps	Goals	Apps	Goals	Apps	Goals	Apps	Goals	Apps	Goals
Blaublitz Akita	2022	J2 League	5	0	1	0	–		0	0	6	0
Career total			5	0	1	0	0	0	0	0	6	0
