= Takuma Aoshima =

Japanese footballer

Takuma Aoshima 青島 拓馬

Personal information
- Full name: Takuma Aoshima
- Date of birth: April 6, 1993 (age 33)
- Place of birth: Hamamatsu, Japan
- Height: 1.71 m (5 ft 7 1/2 in)
- Position: Midfielder

Youth career
- 2012–2015: Hosei University

Senior career*
Years	Team	Apps	(Gls)
2016–2021	Blaublitz Akita	98	(4)
Total		98	(4)
- * Club domestic league appearances and goals as of 05:15, 17 January 2024

Takuma Aoshima (青島 拓馬, Aoshima Takuma; born April 6, 1993) is a Japanese former football player. He spent his entire career with Blaublitz Akita.

== Early life ==
Takuma was born in Hamamatsu. He went to Hosei University.

== Club statistics ==
Updated to 27 November 2021.

Club performance			League		Cup		Total	
Season	Club	League	Apps	Goals	Apps	Goals	Apps	Goals
Japan			League		Emperor's Cup		Total	
2016	Blaublitz Akita	J3 League	15	0	2	0	17	0
2017	Blaublitz Akita	J3 League	29	2	0	0	29	2
2018	Blaublitz Akita	J3 League	23	2	1	0	24	2
2019	Blaublitz Akita	J3 League	15	0	1	0	16	0
2020	Blaublitz Akita	J3 League	16	0	2	0	18	0
2021	Blaublitz Akita	J2 League	0	0	1	0	1	0
Total			98	4	7	0	115	4

== Honours ==
Blaublitz Akita

- J3 League (2): 2017, 2020
