= Naoki Inoue (footballer) =

Japanese footballer

Naoki Inoue 井上直輝

Personal information
- Date of birth: 5 August 1997 (age 29)
- Place of birth: Settsu, Osaka, Japan
- Height: 1.70 m (5 ft 7 in)
- Positions: Forward; midfielder

Team information
- Current team: Kataller Toyama
- Number: 16

Youth career
- 2013–2015: Rissho Univ. Shonan High School

College career
Years	Team	Apps	(Gls)
2016–2019	Biwako Seikei Sport College		

Senior career*
Years	Team	Apps	(Gls)
2020–2024	Blaublitz Akita	94	(8)
2024-	Kataller Toyama	31	(1)
- * Club domestic league appearances and goals as of 1 January 2026

Naoki Inoue (井上直輝, Inoue Naoki; born 5 August 1997) is a Japanese footballer who plays as a midfielder for J2 League club Blaublitz Akita.

== Career statistics ==
=== Club ===
As of 3 December 2022.

Club	Season	League			National Cup		League Cup		Other		Total	
Club	Season	Division	Apps	Goals	Apps	Goals	Apps	Goals	Apps	Goals	Apps	Goals
Biwako Seikei	2017		–		1	0	–		0	0	1	0
Blaublitz Akita	2020	J3 League	31	4	2	0	–		0	0	33	4
Blaublitz Akita	2021	J2 League	27	2	1	1	–		0	0	28	3
Blaublitz Akita	2022	J2 League	25	2	1	0	–		0	0	26	2
Blaublitz Akita	2023	J2 League	0	0	0	0	–		0	0	0	0
Career total			83	8	5	1	0	0	0	0	88	9

== Honours ==
Blaublitz Akita

- J3 League (1): 2020
