= Yuta Shimozawa =

Japanese footballer

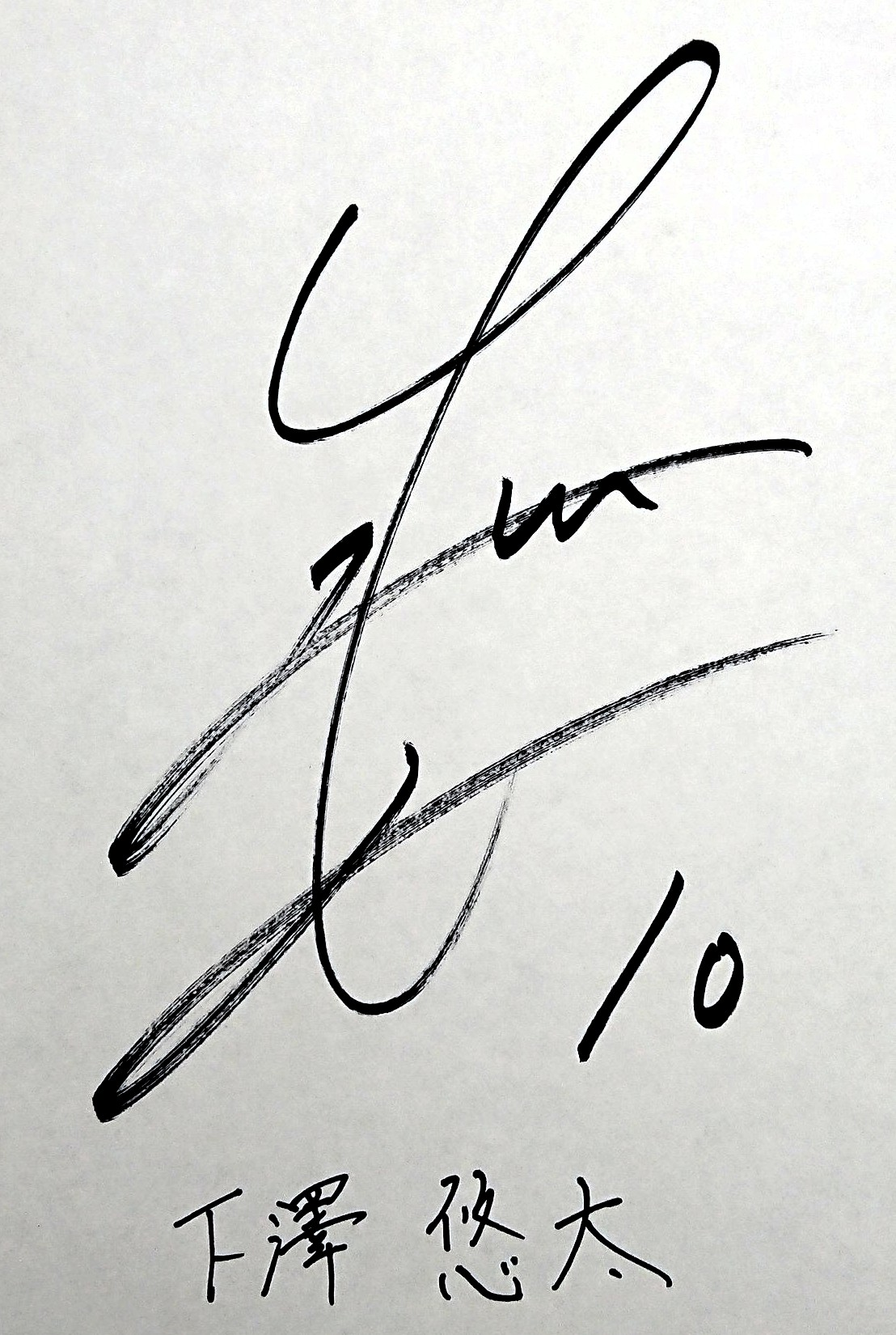

Personal information
- Date of birth: 4 September 1997 (age 29)
- Place of birth: Tokyo, Japan
- Height: 1.70 m (5 ft 7 in)
- Position: Midfielder

Team information
- Current team: Tegevajaro Miyazaki
- Number: 18

Youth career
- –2012: FC Proud
- 2013–2015: Kashiwa Reysol

College career
Years	Team	Apps	(Gls)
2016–2019	Hosei University		

Senior career*
Years	Team	Apps	(Gls)
2020–2021	Blaublitz Akita	24	(0)
2022–2023	Tegevajaro Miyazaki	60	(5)
2024-	FC Osaka	19	(1)
- * Club domestic league appearances and goals as of 13 August 2024 @ 15:45(AEST)

Yuta Shimozawa (下澤 悠太, Shimozawa Yuta; born 4 September 1997) is a Japanese footballer currently playing as a midfielder for Tegevajaro Miyazaki.

== Career statistics ==
=== Club ===
As of 25 December 2022.

Club	Season	League			National Cup		League Cup		Other		Total	
Club	Season	Division	Apps	Goals	Apps	Goals	Apps	Goals	Apps	Goals	Apps	Goals
Blaublitz Akita	2020	J3 League	24	0	0	0	–		0	0	24	0
Blaublitz Akita	2021	J2 League	0	0	0	0	–		0	0	0	0
Tegevajaro Miyazaki	2022	J3 League	26	3	0	0	–		0	0	26	3
Tegevajaro Miyazaki	2023	J3 League	0	0	0	0	–		0	0	0	0
Career total			50	3	0	0	0	0	0	0	50	3

== Honours ==
Blaublitz Akita

- J3 League (1): 2020
