= Yūji Wakasa =

Japanese footballer (born 1996)

Yūji Wakasa 輪笠 祐士
Personal information
- Full name: Yūji Wakasa
- Date of birth: February 9, 1996 (age 30)
- Place of birth: Inagi, Japan
- Height: 1.71 m (5 ft 7 1/2 in)
- Position: Midfielder

Team information
- Current team: Renofa Yamaguchi
- Number: 6

Youth career
- Minoh Minami JFC
- –2007: Minamiyama Eleven FC
- 2008–2013: FC Tokyo

College career
Years	Team	Apps	(Gls)
2014–2017	Nippon Sport Science University		

Senior career*
Years	Team	Apps	(Gls)
2018–2019	Fukushima United FC	63	(3)
2020–2022	Blaublitz Akita	91	(3)
2022–2025	Fagiano Okayama	59	(1)
2025	→ Renofa Yamaguchi (loan)	12	(0)
2026–	Renofa Yamaguchi	21	(1)
- * Club domestic league appearances and goals as of 21 August 2026

Yūji Wakasa (輪笠 祐士, Wakasa Yūji; born February 9, 1996) is a Japanese footballer who plays as a midfielder for J3 League club Renofa Yamaguchi.

== Early life ==
Wakasa spent time at FC Tokyo's youth team and Nippon Sport Science University before joining Fukushima United FC.

== Career ==
After attending the Nippon Sport Science University, Wakasa was announced at Fukushima United FC in December 2017. He made his league debut against Thespa Gunma on 11 March 2018. Wakasa scored his first league goal against Fujieda MYFC on 3 November 2018, scoring in the 32nd minute.

In 2020, Wakasa was announced at Blaublitz Akita. He made his league debut against Roasso Kumamoto on 9 August 2020. Wakasa scored his first league goal against JEF United Chiba on 14 March 2021, scoring in the 17th minute.

On 8 August 2022, Wakasa was announced at Fagiano Okayama. He made his league debut against Yokohama FC on 20 August 2022. Wakasa scored his first league goal against Roasso Kumamoto on 20 April 2024, scoring in the 30th minute.

On 3 June 2025, Wakasa was announced on loan at Renofa Yamaguchi on a six month loan deal.

== Personal life ==
Wakasa is married. He also has a son.

== Club statistics ==
As of 30 March 2026.

Appearances and goals by club, season and competition
Club	Season	League			National cup (Note: Includes Emperors Cup)		League cup (Note: Includes J.League Cup)		Other		Total	
Club	Season	Division	Apps	Goals	Apps	Goals	Apps	Goals	Apps	Goals	Apps	Goals
Fukushima United FC	2018	J3 League	32	1	–		–		–		32	1
Fukushima United FC	2019	J3 League	31	2	–		–		–		31	2
Fukushima United FC	Total		63	3	0	0	0	0	0	0	63	3
Blaublitz Akita	2020	J3 League	25	0	2	0	–		–		27	0
Blaublitz Akita	2021	J2 League	37	2	0	0	–		–		37	2
Blaublitz Akita	2022	J2 League	29	1	0	0	–		–		29	1
Blaublitz Akita	Total		91	3	2	0	0	0	0	0	93	3
Fagiano Okayama	2022	J2 League	12	0	0	0	0	0	1 (Note: Appearance in J1/J2 play-offs)	0	13	0
Fagiano Okayama	2023	J2 League	29	0	1	0	0	0	0	0	30	0
Fagiano Okayama	2024	J2 League	15	1	1	0	1	0	1	0	18	1
Fagiano Okayama	2025	J1 League	1	0	0	0	1	0	0	0	2	0
Fagiano Okayama	Total		57	1	2	0	2	0	2	0	63	1
Renofa Yamaguchi (loan)	2025	J2 League	12	0	1	0	–		–		13	0
Renofa Yamaguchi	2026	J2/J3 (100)	8	0	0	0	–		–		8	0
Career total			231	7	5	0	2	0	2	0	240	7

== Honours ==
Blaublitz Akita

- J3 League (1): 2020
