= Koki Shimosaka =

Japanese footballer (born 1993)

Koki Shimosaka 下坂 晃城
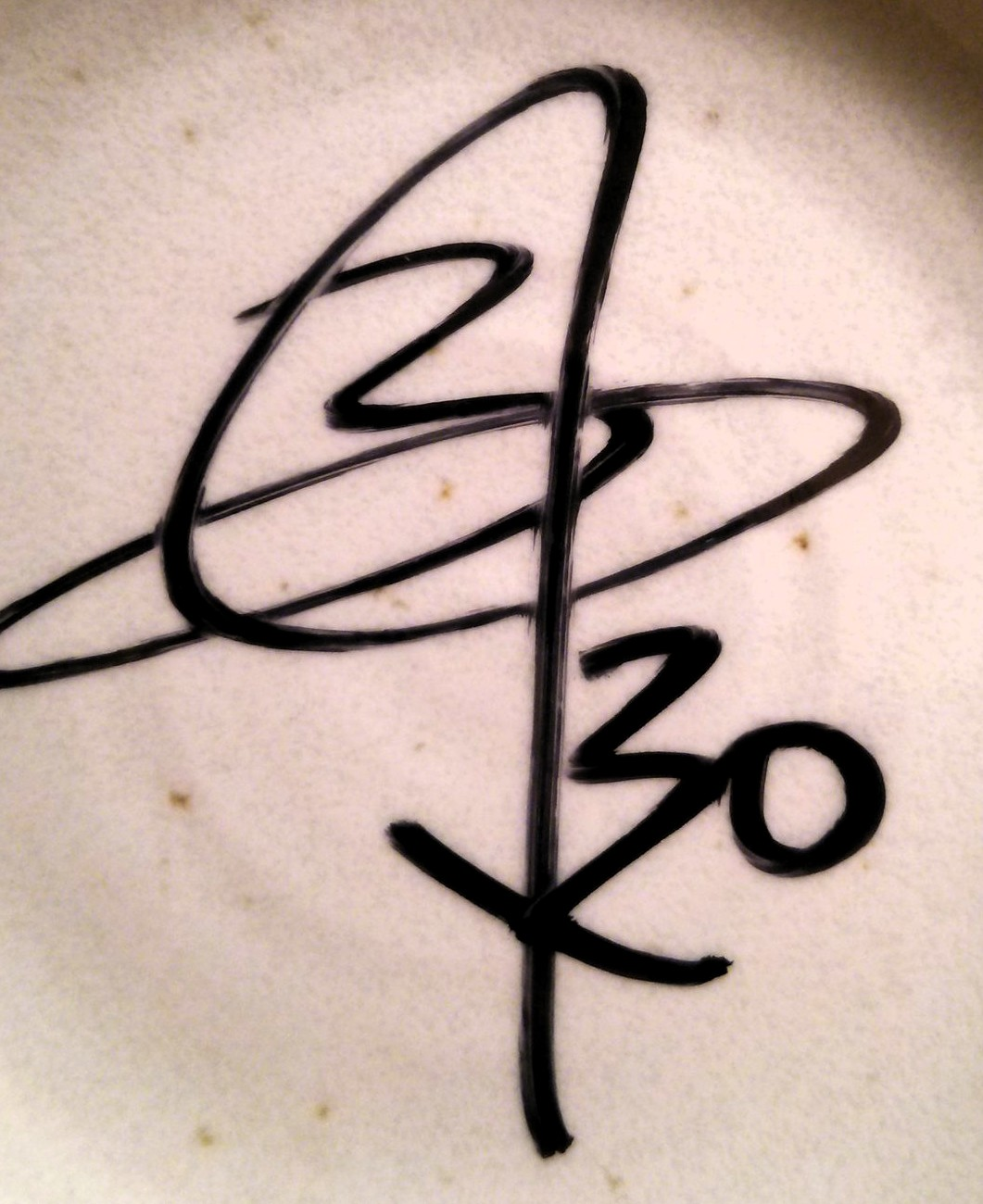

Personal information
- Full name: Koki Shimosaka
- Date of birth: September 25, 1993 (age 33)
- Place of birth: Kitakyushu, Fukuoka, Japan
- Height: 1.74 m (5 ft 8 1/2 in)
- Position: Defender

Youth career
- 2012–2015: NIFS

Senior career*
Years	Team	Apps	(Gls)
2016–2018	Avispa Fukuoka	8	(0)
2018	→ Machida Zelvia (loan)	8	(1)
2019–2020	Machida Zelvia	21	(1)
2021–2022	Blaublitz Akita	4	(1)
Total		41	(3)
- * Club domestic league appearances and goals

Koki Shimosaka (下坂 晃城, Shimosaka Kōki; born September 25, 1993) is a Japanese former footballer. He played for Avispa Fukuoka, Machida Zelvia and Blaublitz Akita before retiring at the end of the 2022 season.

== Career ==
Koki Shimosaka joined J1 League club Avispa Fukuoka in 2016. On, he debuted in J.League Cup (v Kawasaki Frontale).

== Club statistics ==
Appearances and goals by club, season and competition
Club	Season	League			National cup (Note: Includes Emperor's Cup)		League cup (Note: Includes J.League Cup)		Total	
Club	Season	Division	Apps	Goals	Apps	Goals	Apps	Goals	Apps	Goals
NIFS Kanoya	2013	–			1	0	–		1	0
Avispa Fukuoka	2016	J1 League	0	0	2	0	4	0	6	0
Avispa Fukuoka	2017	J2 League	8	0	0	0	0	0	8	0
Avispa Fukuoka	Total		8	0	2	0	4	0	14	0
Machida Zelvia (loan)	2018	J2 League	8	1	1	0	–		9	1
Machida Zelvia	2019	J2 League	21	1	0	0	–		21	1
Blaublitz Akita	2021	J2 League	1	0	1	0	–		2	0
Blaublitz Akita	2022	J2 League	3	1	1	0	–		4	1
Blaublitz Akita	Total		4	1	2	0	0	0	6	1
Career total			41	3	6	0	4	0	51	3
