= Ibuki Yoshida =

Japanese footballer

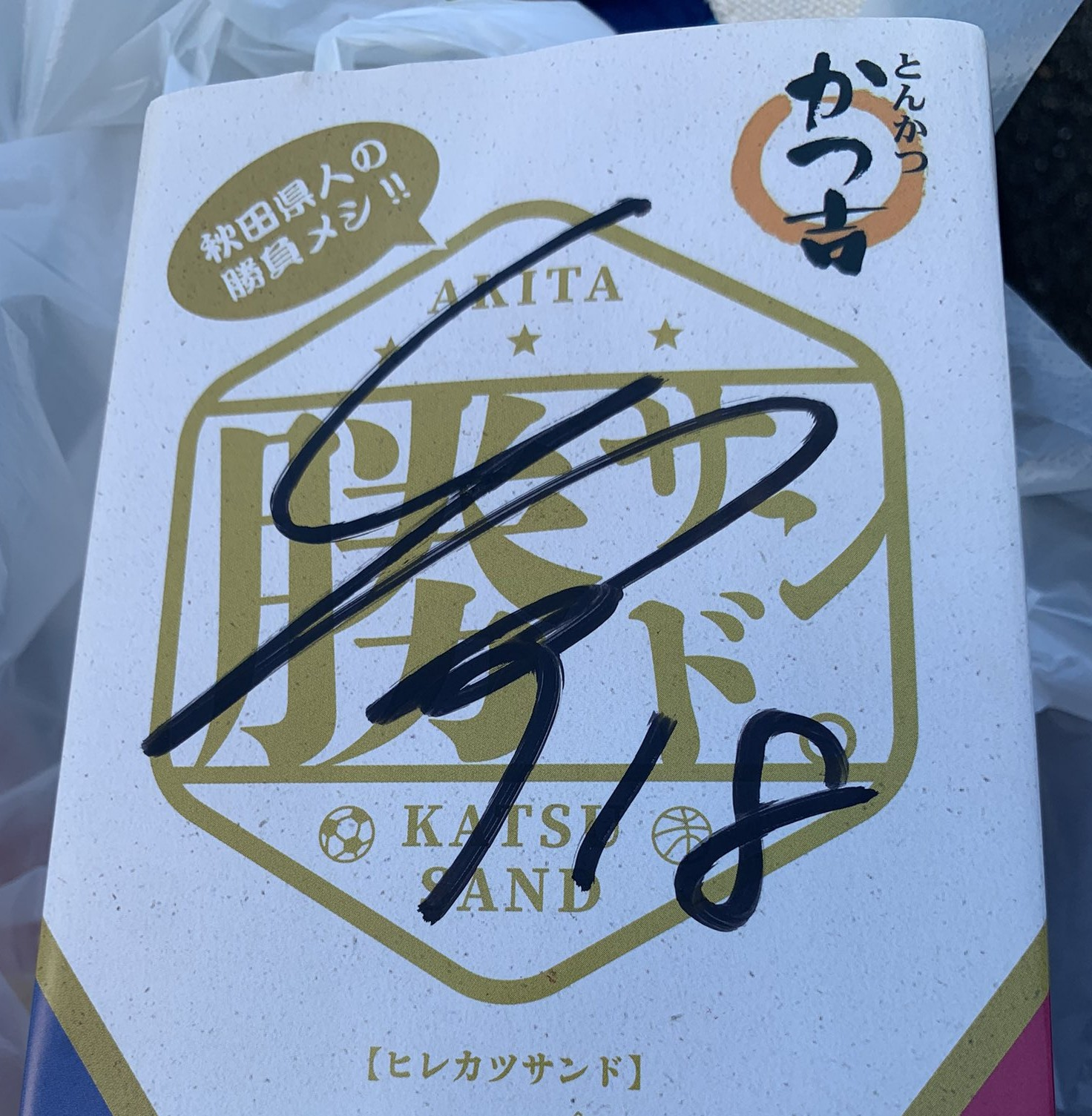

Personal information
- Date of birth: 1 November 1997 (age 29)
- Place of birth: Aoba-ku, Sendai, Miyagi, Japan
- Height: 1.80 m (5 ft 11 in)
- Position: Forward

Team information
- Current team: Gainare Tottori
- Number: 22

Youth career
- Sendai FC
- 2013–2015: Vegalta Sendai

College career
Years	Team	Apps	(Gls)
2016–2019	Sanno Institute of Management		

Senior career*
Years	Team	Apps	(Gls)
2019–2020	Nagano Parceiro	27	(6)
2021–2024	Blaublitz Akita	91	(10)
2025–	Gainare Tottori	17	(2)
- * Club domestic league appearances and goals as of 24 August 2026

Ibuki Yoshida (吉田 伊吹, Yoshida Ibuki; born 1 November 1997) is a Japanese footballer who plays as a forward for J3 League club Gainare Tottori.

== Career statistics ==
=== Club ===
As of 27 November 2022.

Club	Season	League			National Cup		League Cup		Other		Total	
Club	Season	Division	Apps	Goals	Apps	Goals	Apps	Goals	Apps	Goals	Apps	Goals
Nagano Parceiro	2019	J3 League	0	0	0	0	–		0	0	0	0
Nagano Parceiro	2020	J3 League	27	6	0	0	–		0	0	27	6
Nagano Parceiro	Total		27	6	0	0	0	0	0	0	27	6
Blaublitz Akita	2021	J2 League	24	3	1	0	–		0	0	25	3
Blaublitz Akita	2022	J2 League	38	5	1	0	–		0	0	39	5
Blaublitz Akita	2023	J2 League	0	0	0	0	–		0	0	0	0
Career total			89	9	2	0	0	0	0	0	91	14
