= Shigeto Masuda =

Japanese footballer

Shigeto Masuda 増田 繁人
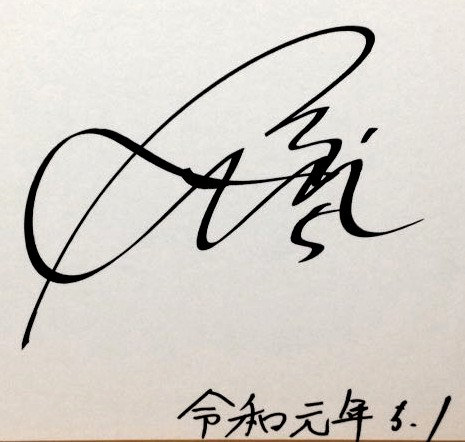

Personal information
- Full name: Shigeto Masuda
- Date of birth: June 11, 1992 (age 34)
- Place of birth: Kamagaya, Chiba, Japan
- Height: 1.90 m (6 ft 3 in)
- Position: Centre-back

Team information
- Current team: Heidelberg United
- Number: 17

Youth career
- 2008–2010: RKU Kashiwa High School

Senior career*
Years	Team	Apps	(Gls)
2011–2017	Albirex Niigata	16	(1)
2013	→ Thespakusatsu Gunma (loan)	11	(1)
2014	→ Oita Trinita (loan)	1	(0)
2015	→ Machida Zelvia (loan)	32	(4)
2017	→ Machida Zelvia (loan)	26	(2)
2018–2020	Fagiano Okayama	23	(2)
2020	Fujieda MYFC	0	(0)
2021-2022	Blaublitz Akita	21	(3)
2023–	Heidelberg United	1	(0)
- * Club domestic league appearances and goals as of 17 February 2023

Shigeto Masuda (増田 繁人, Masuda Shigeto; born June 11, 1992) is a Japanese football player who plays for NPL Victoria club Heidelberg United.

== Club statistics ==
Updated to 25 November 2022.

Club performance			League		Cup		League Cup		Other		Total	
Season	Club	League	Apps	Goals	Apps	Goals	Apps	Goals	Apps	Goals	Apps	Goals
Japan			League		Emperor's Cup		J. League Cup		Other^{1}		Total	
2010	Albirex Niigata	J1 League	2	0	0	0	0	0	-		2	0
2012	Albirex Niigata	J1 League	0	0	1	0	0	0	-		1	0
2013	Thespakusatsu Gunma	J2 League	11	1	1	0	-		-		12	1
2014	Oita Trinita	J2 League	1	0	1	0	-		-		2	0
2015	Machida Zelvia	J3 League	32	4	3	0	-		2	0	37	4
2016	Albirex Niigata	J1 League	14	1	1	0	4	0	-		19	1
2017	Albirex Niigata	J1 League	0	0	0	0	0	0	-		0	0
2017	Machida Zelvia	J2 League	26	2	1	0	-		-		27	2
2018	Fagiano Okayama	J2 League	15	1	0	0	-		-		15	1
2019	Fagiano Okayama	J2 League	8	1	2	1	-		-		10	3
2020	Fagiano Okayama	J2 League	0	0	0	0	-		-		0	0
2020	Fujieda MYFC	J3 League	0	0	0	0	-		-		0	0
2021	Blaublitz Akita	J2 League	28	3	0	0	-		-		28	3
2022	Blaublitz Akita	J2 League	0	0	0	0	-		-		0	0
Total			137	13	10	1	4	0	2	0	153	14

^{1}Includes J2/J3 Playoffs.
