= Yuko Takase =

Japanese footballer

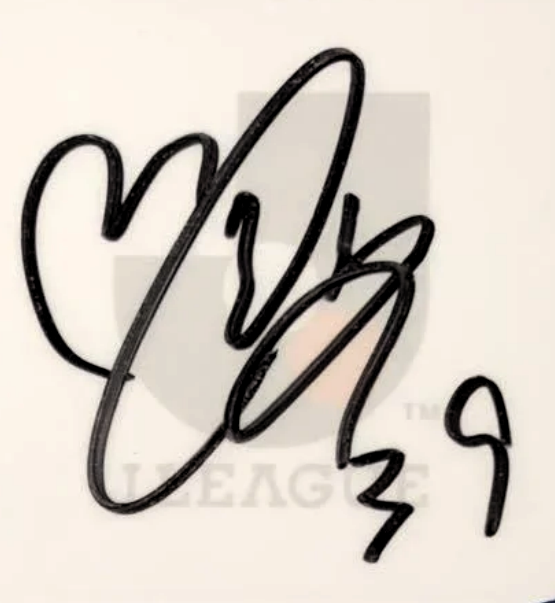

Personal information
- Date of birth: November 25, 1991 (age 34)
- Place of birth: Chūō-ku, Saitama, Japan
- Height: 1.72 m (5 ft 7 1/2 in)
- Position: Defender

Team information
- Current team: Aventura Kawaguchi

Youth career
- 2010–2013: Chuo University

Senior career*
Years	Team	Apps	(Gls)
2014–2017	Omiya Ardija	3	(0)
2016–2017	→ Thespakusatsu Gunma (loan)	39	(1)
2018–2019	Roasso Kumamoto	38	(4)
2020	Thespakusatsu Gunma	23	(0)
2021-2022	Blaublitz Akita	35	(0)
2023-	Aventura Kawaguchi	0	(0)
- * Club domestic league appearances and goals as of 28 February 2023

Yuko Takase (高瀬 優孝, Takase Yūkō; born November 25, 1991 in Saitama, Saitama) is a Japanese football player for Aventura Kawaguchi.

== Career statistics ==
Updated to 2 December 2022.

Appearances and goals by club, season and competition
Club	Season	League			Emperor's Cup		J.League Cup		Total	
Club	Season	Division	Apps	Goals	Apps	Goals	Apps	Goals	Apps	Goals
Omiya Ardija	2014	J1 League	2	0	4	0	1	0	7	0
Omiya Ardija	2015	J2 League	1	0	0	0	—		1	0
Thespakusatsu Gunma	2016	J2 League	33	1	1	0	—		34	1
Thespakusatsu Gunma	2017	J2 League	6	0	0	0	—		6	0
Roasso Kumamoto	2018	J2 League	9	0	1	1	—		10	1
Roasso Kumamoto	2019	J3 League	29	4	1	1	—		30	5
Thespakusatsu Gunma	2020	J2 League	23	0	0	0	—		23	0
Blaublitz Akita	2021	J2 League	11	0	0	0	—		11	0
Blaublitz Akita	2022	J2 League	24	0	1	0	—		25	0
Career total			138	5	8	2	1	0	147	7
