= Ryota Nakamura =

Japanese footballer (born 1991)

Ryota Nakamura 中村 亮太
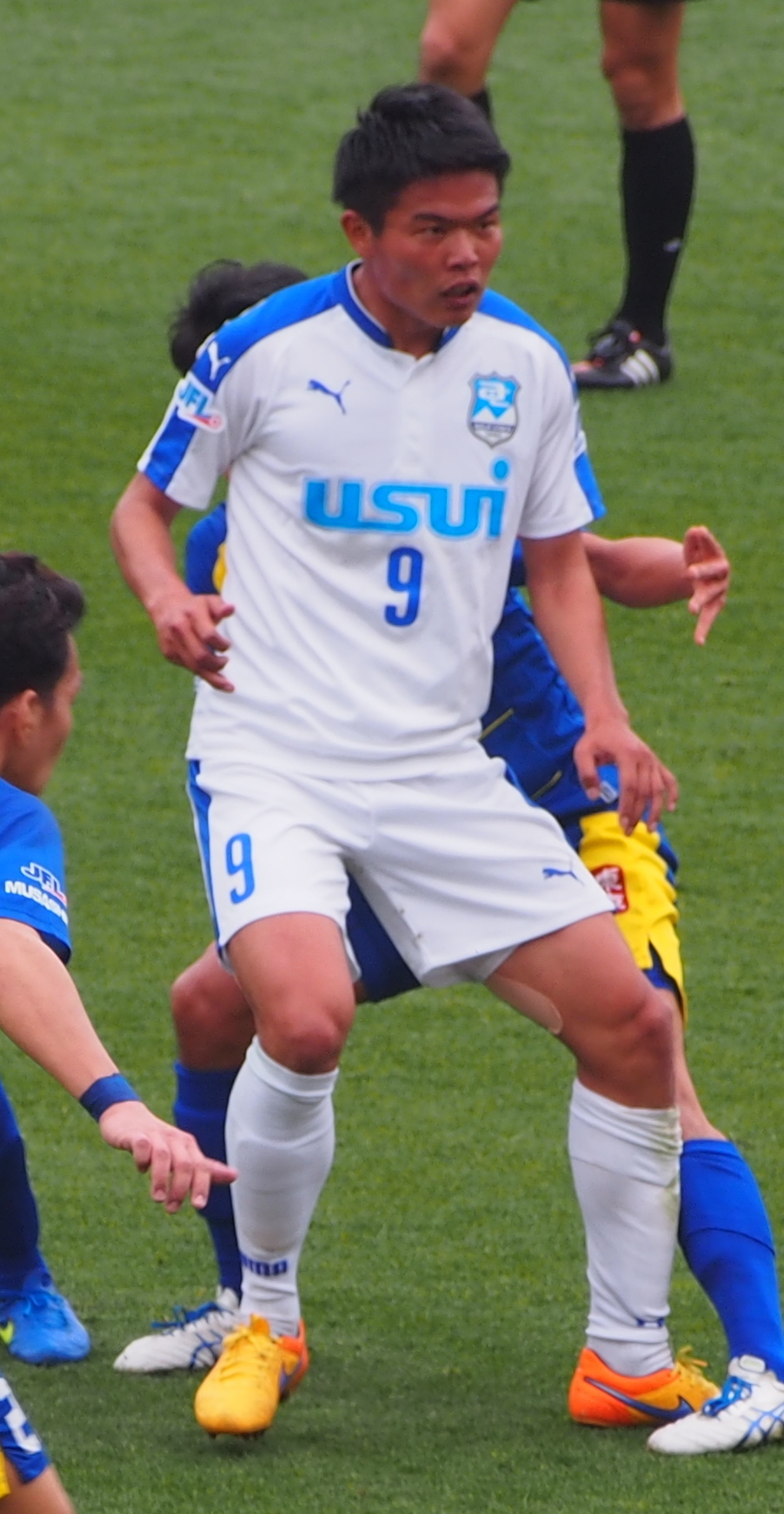

Personal information
- Full name: Ryota Nakamura
- Date of birth: January 28, 1991 (age 35)
- Place of birth: Nagoya, Japan
- Height: 1.78 m (5 ft 10 in)
- Position: Forward

Team information
- Current team: Blaublitz Akita
- Number: 9

Youth career
- –2005: Nagoya FC
- 2006–2008: Chukyo Univ. Chukyo High School

College career
Years	Team	Apps	(Gls)
2009–2012	Chukyo University		

Senior career*
Years	Team	Apps	(Gls)
2013–2015	Matsumoto Yamaga	1	(0)
2014–2015	→ FC Osaka (loan)	40	(16)
2016–2017	Azul Claro Numazu	58	(14)
2018–	Blaublitz Akita	207	(31)

International career
- Japan U-14
- * Club domestic league appearances and goals as of 14 August 2026

Ryota Nakamura (中村 亮太, Nakamura Ryōta; born January 28, 1991), nicknamed Azuki, is a Japanese footballer who plays as a midfielder for J2 League club Blaublitz Akita.

== Playing career ==
Ryota Nakamura played for J2 League club; Matsumoto Yamaga FC in 2013 season. On 4 April 2015, he scored his first hat-trick in a 3–0 win over FC Maruyasu Okazaki at Yanmar Field Nagai. Azuki bagged his second career hat-trick, in a 5–0 win against Kamatamare Sanuki on 15 September 2019.

== Club statistics ==
Updated to 29 November 2022.

Appearances and goals by club, season and competition
Club	Season	League			Emperor's Cup		Total	
Club	Season	Division	Apps	Goals	Apps	Goals	Apps	Goals
Chukyo University	2010	-	0	0	2	0	2	0
Matsumoto Yamaga	2013	J2 League	1	0	0	0	1	0
FC Osaka	2014	JRL (Kansai, Div. 1)	13	6	1	0	14	6
FC Osaka	2015	JFL	27	10	2	1	1	0
Azul Claro Numazu	2016	JFL	28	7	–		28	7
Azul Claro Numazu	2017	J3 League	30	7	1	0	31	7
Blaublitz Akita	2018	J3 League	23	1	1	0	24	1
Blaublitz Akita	2019	J3 League	27	11	0	0	27	11
Blaublitz Akita	2020	J3 League	25	10	2	0	27	10
Blaublitz Akita	2021	J2 League	40	5	0	0	40	5
Blaublitz Akita	2022	J2 League	30	2	0	0	30	2
Blaublitz Akita	2023	J2 League	0	0	0	0	0	0
Career total			244	59	9	1	253	60

== Honours ==
Blaublitz Akita

- J3 League (1): 2020
