= Hayate Take =

Japanese footballer

Hayate Take 武 颯
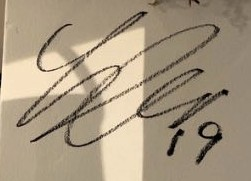

Personal information
- Full name: Hayate Take
- Date of birth: July 17, 1995 (age 31)
- Place of birth: Kanazawa-ku, Yokohama, Japan
- Height: 1.75 m (5 ft 9 in)
- Position: Forward

Team information
- Current team: FC Gifu
- Number: 95

Youth career
- Mutsuura Mainichi SC
- –2013: Yokohama F. Marinos

College career
Years	Team	Apps	(Gls)
2014–2017	Waseda University		

Senior career*
Years	Team	Apps	(Gls)
2018–2019	Fukushima United FC	61	(23)
2020	Kataller Toyama	30	(10)
2021–2023	Blaublitz Akita	72	(11)
2023	→ Thespakusatsu Gunma (loan)	24	(3)
2024	FC Osaka	9	(1)
2024	→ Tegevajaro Miyazaki (loan)	14	(8)
2025-2026	Kataller Toyama	19	(2)
2025	→ Tegevajaro Miyazaki (loan)	12	(5)
2026	Tegevajaro Miyazaki	16	(2)
2026-	FC Gifu	1	(1)

International career
2011	Japan U-16	3	(1)
- * Club domestic league appearances and goals as of 17 August 2026

Hayate Take (武 颯, Take Hayate; born July 17, 1995) is a Japanese football player currently playing for FC Gifu.

== Career ==
Hayate Take joined J3 League club Fukushima United FC in 2018. After two solid seasons with the Fukushima-based club, he joined Kataller Toyama for the 2020 season.

== Club statistics ==
Updated to 3 December 2022.

Club performance			League		Cup		League Cup		Total	
Season	Club	League	Apps	Goals	Apps	Goals	Apps	Goals	Apps	Goals
Japan			League		Emperor's Cup		J. League Cup		Total	
2016	Waseda University	-	–		1	0	–		1	0
2018	Fukushima United	J3 League	29	8	–		–		29	8
2019	Fukushima United	J3 League	32	15	0	0	–		32	15
2020	Kataller Toyama	J3 League	30	10	–		–		30	10
2021	Blaublitz Akita	J2 League	33	7	1	0	–		34	7
2022	Blaublitz Akita	J2 League	39	4	1	0	–		40	4
Total			163	44	3	0	–		166	44
