= Kaito Chida =

Japanese footballer

Kaito Chida 千田海人

Personal information
- Full name: Kaito Chida
- Date of birth: October 17, 1994 (age 32)
- Place of birth: Sendai, Japan
- Height: 1.85 m (6 ft 1 in)
- Position: Defender

Team information
- Current team: Kashima Antlers
- Number: 4

Youth career
- Kuromatsu Pal FC
- –2009: FC Miyagi Barcelona
- 2010–2012: Vegalta Sendai

College career
Years	Team	Apps	(Gls)
2013–2016	Kanagawa University		

Senior career*
Years	Team	Apps	(Gls)
2017–2022	Blaublitz Akita	147	(6)
2023–2025	Tokyo Verdy	47	(0)
2025–	Kashima Antlers	0	(0)
- * Club domestic league appearances and goals as of 12:19, 16 June 2025 (UTC)

Kaito Chida (千田 海人, Chida Kaito; born October 17, 1994) is a Japanese professional footballer who plays as a centre back for J1 League club Kashima Antlers.

== Career ==
Kaito Chida joined J3 League club Blaublitz Akita in 2017.

== Career statistics ==
=== Club ===
As of 16 June 2025

Appearances and goals by club, season and competition
Club	Season	League			National Cup		League Cup		Other		Total	
Club	Season	Division	Apps	Goals	Apps	Goals	Apps	Goals	Apps	Goals	Apps	Goals
Japan			League		Emperor's Cup		J. League Cup		Other		Total	
Kanagawa University	2016	–			2	0	–		–		2	0
Blaublitz Akita	2017	J3 League	8	0	0	0	–		–		8	0
Blaublitz Akita	2018	J3 League	26	0	0	0	–		–		26	0
Blaublitz Akita	2019	J3 League	32	2	1	0	–		–		33	2
Blaublitz Akita	2020	J3 League	29	3	2	0	–		–		31	3
Blaublitz Akita	2021	J2 League	19	0	0	0	–		–		19	0
Blaublitz Akita	2022	J2 League	33	1	0	0	–		–		33	1
Blaublitz Akita	Total		147	6	3	0	0	0	0	0	150	6
Tokyo Verdy	2023	J2 League	12	0	2	0	–		–		14	0
Tokyo Verdy	2024	J1 League	27	0	2	0	1	0	–		30	0
Tokyo Verdy	2025	J1 League	8	0	0	0	1	0	–		9	0
Tokyo Verdy	Total		47	0	4	0	2	0	0	0	53	0
Kashima Antlers	2025	J1 League	0	0	0	0	0	0	–		0	0
Career total			194	5	9	0	2	0	0	0	203	6

== Honours ==
Kashima Antlers

- J1 League: 2025

Blaublitz Akita

- J3 League: 2017, 2020

=== Individual ===
- Milk Soccer Academy Data Awards 2020 J3 Best Defender
