= Nao Eguchi =

Japanese football player (born 1992)

Nao Eguchi 江口 直生
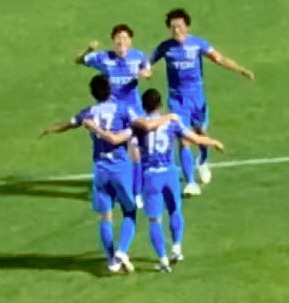
- Eguchi #15 in 2020

Personal information
- Full name: Nao Eguchi
- Date of birth: March 22, 1992 (age 34)
- Place of birth: Yao, Osaka, Japan
- Height: 1.70 m (5 ft 7 in)
- Position: Midfielder

Team information
- Current team: Kamatamare Sanuki
- Number: 7

Youth career
- Yao Kyuhoji JSC
- –2006: Takada FC
- 2007–2009: Osaka Toin High School

College career
Years	Team	Apps	(Gls)
2010–2013	Osaka Sangyo University		

Senior career*
Years	Team	Apps	(Gls)
2014–2016	Ehime FC	22	(0)
2017–2022	Blaublitz Akita	103	(10)
2023–	Kamatamare Sanuki	70	(8)
- * Club domestic league appearances and goals as of 1 January 2026

Nao Eguchi (江口 直生, Eguchi Nao; born March 22, 1992 in Yao, Osaka) is a Japanese football player for Kamatamare Sanuki from 2023. He scored a goal from 60 metres for Akita on October 14, 2020.

== Career ==
On 31 October 2022, Eguchi leave from the club after 6 years at Akita.

On 21 December 2022, Eguchi officially transfer to J3 club, Kamatamare Sanuki for upcoming 2023 season.

== Career statistics ==
Updated to the end 2022 season.

=== Club ===
Club performance			League		Cup		Total	
Season	Club	League	Apps	Goals	Apps	Goals	Apps	Goals
Japan			League		Emperor's Cup		Total	
2014	Ehime FC	J2 League	2	0	2	0	4	0
2015	Ehime FC	J2 League	18	0	3	0	21	0
2016	Ehime FC	J2 League	2	0	1	0	3	0
2017	Blaublitz Akita	J3 League	3	0	0	0	3	0
2018	Blaublitz Akita	J3 League	14	1	1	0	15	1
2019	Blaublitz Akita	J3 League	24	2	1	0	25	2
2020	Blaublitz Akita	J3 League	33	6	2	1	35	7
2021	Blaublitz Akita	J2 League	8	1	0	0	8	1
2022	Blaublitz Akita	J2 League	21	0	0	0	21	0
2023	Kamatamare Sanuki	J3 League	0	0	0	0	0	0
Career total			125	10	10	1	135	11

== Honours ==
Blaublitz Akita

- J3 League (2): 2017, 2020
