= Soyu Stadium =

Building in Akita Prefecture, Japan

Soyu Stadium ソユースタジアム
- Soyusuta

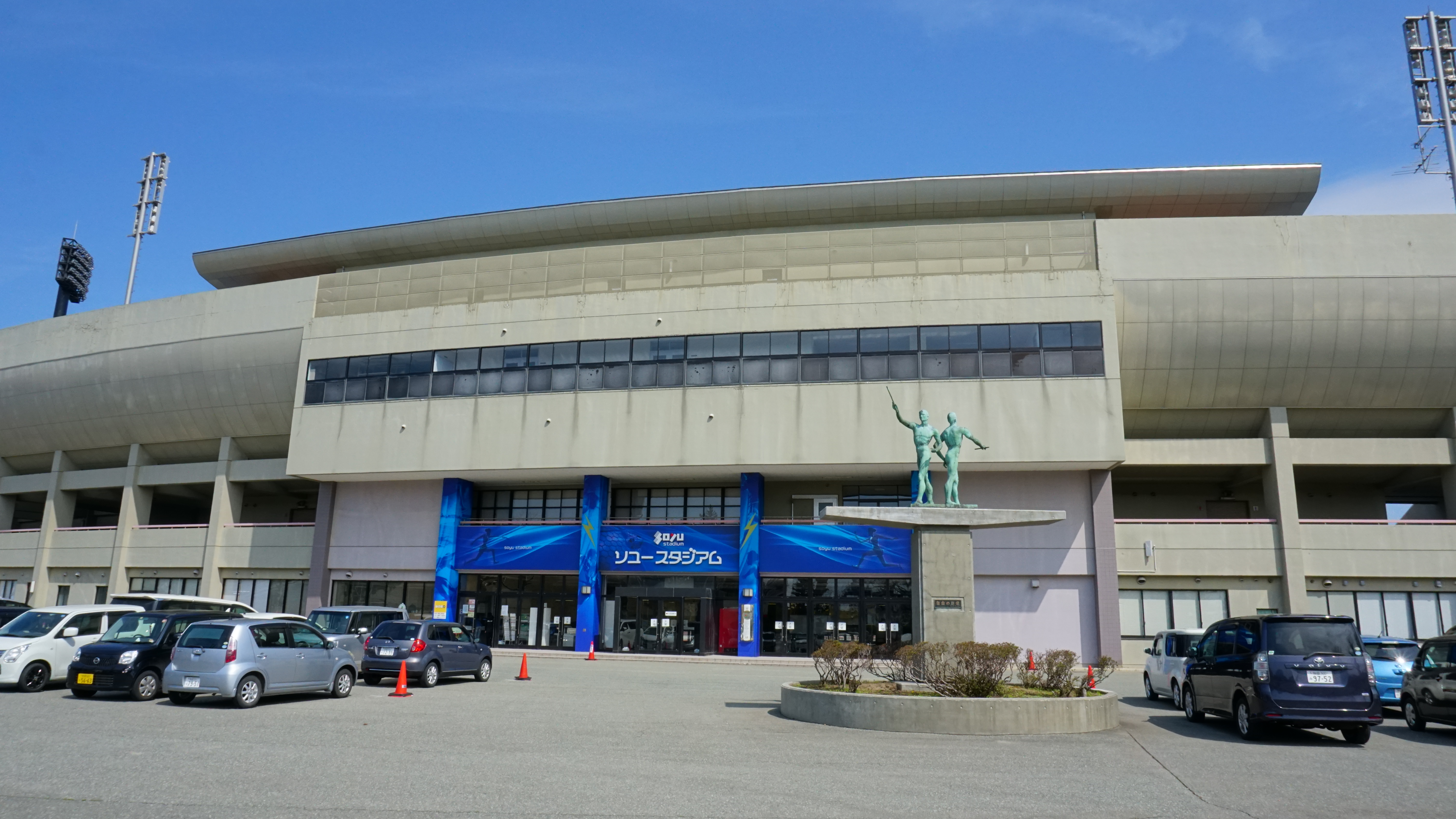

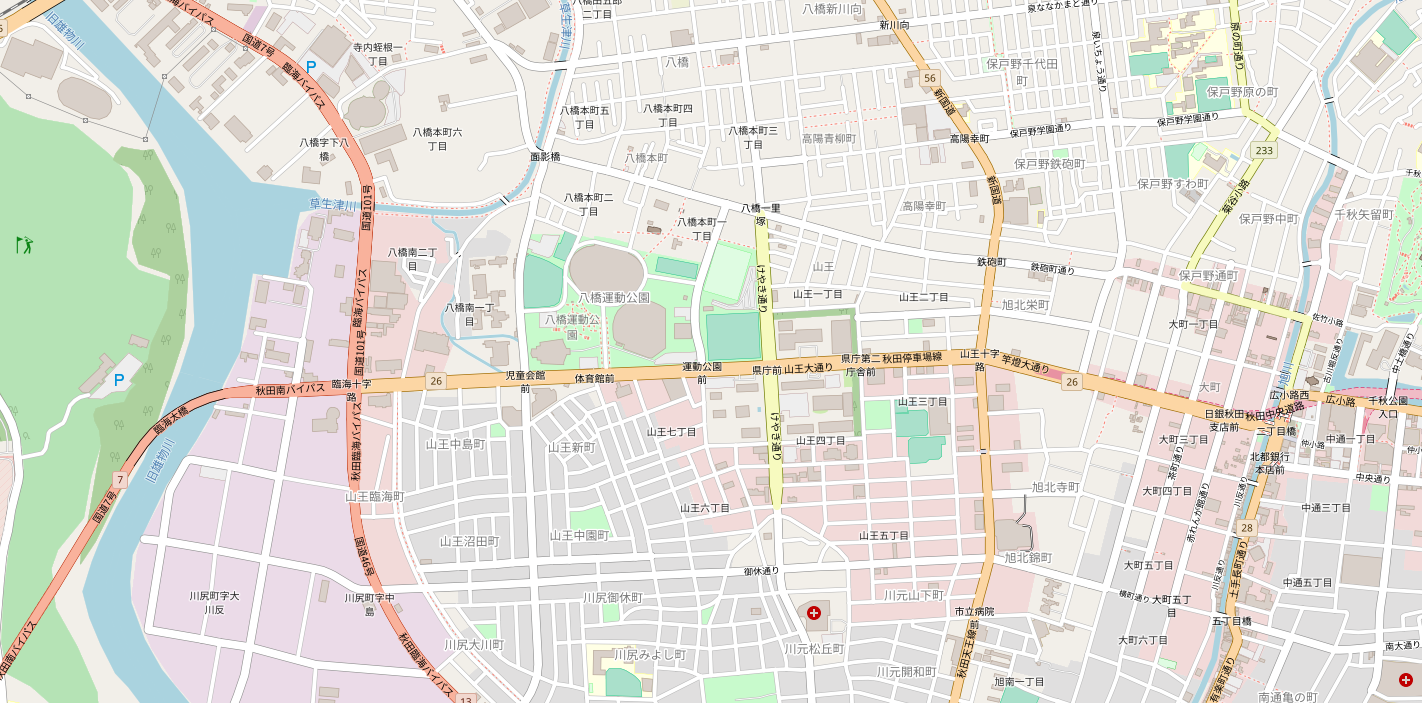
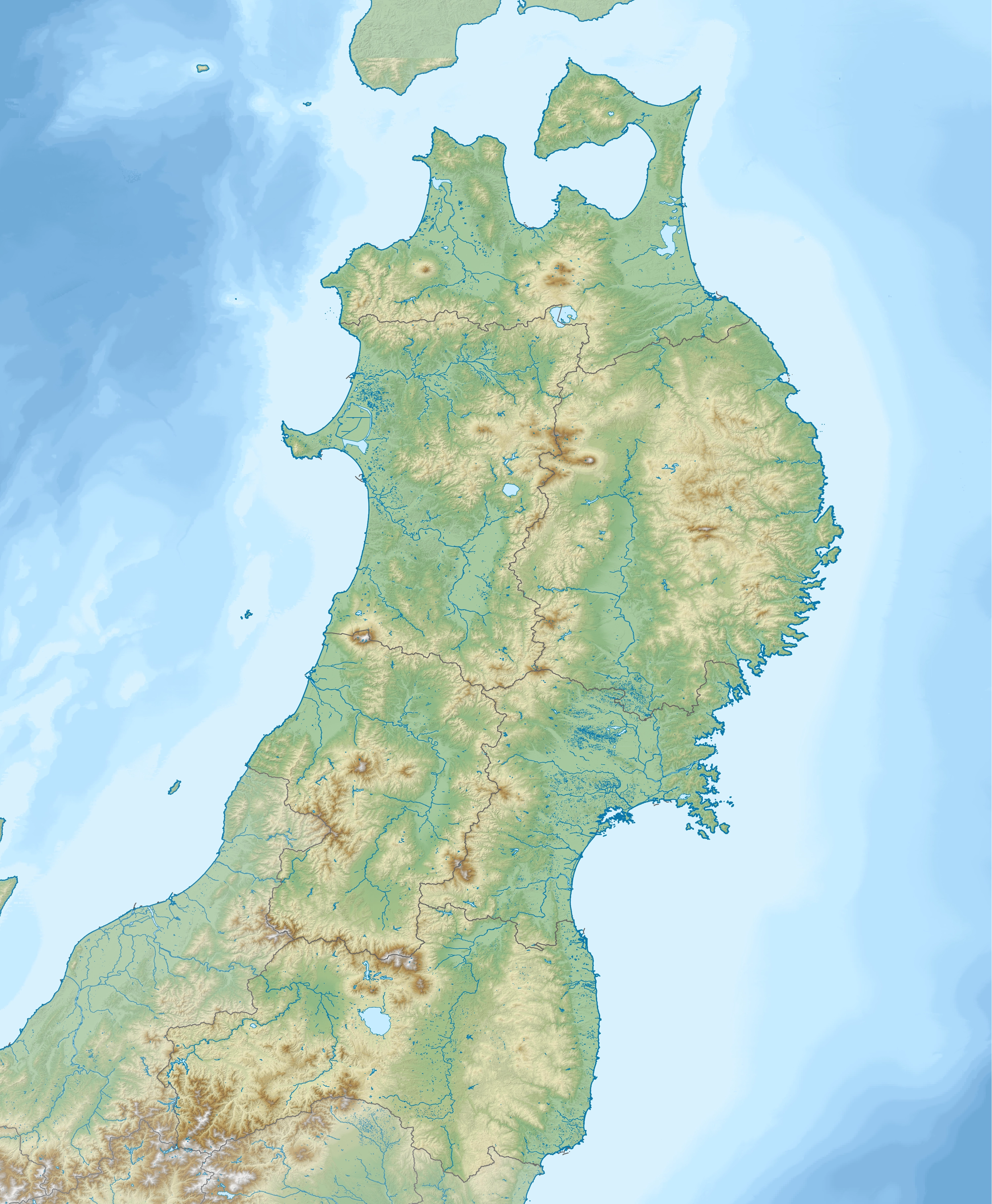
- Location within Akita, Akita Location within Akita Prefecture Location within Tohoku, Japan Location within Japan
- Interactive map of Soyu Stadium ソユースタジアム
- Former names: Akita Yabase Athletic Field (1941–2019)
- Location: Akita, Akita, Japan
- Coordinates: 39°43′15″N 140°05′44″E
- Owner: City of Akita
- Capacity: 20,125; J.League:18,560
- Surface: Grass
- Scoreboard: Panasonic 650-inch display
- Record attendance: 27,090
- Field size: 107 × 71.5 m
- Parking: 303 spaces

Construction
- Opened: 23 September 1941
- Renovated: 1961, 1981, 1985, 1995, 2001, 2005, 2010, 2012, 2019
- Expanded: 1995

Tenants
- Blaublitz Akita (2010–2013)(2019-present); Akita City Government SC; Saruta Kōgyō S.C. [tl] Hokuto Bank SC; TDK Shinwakai; Akita University Medical FC

Website
- https://www.city.akita.lg.jp/shisetsu/sports-koen/1009703/1006394.html

Soyu Stadium, formerly a.k.a. Akita Yabase Athletic Field (秋田市八橋運動公園陸上競技場, Akitashi Yabase Undōkōen Rikujōkyōgijō), is an athletic stadium in Akita, Akita, Japan. Located approximately 3 kilometers from the city center, the Akita Yabase Stadium is a multi-use facility opened in September 1941. It has been renovated several times, including a complete rebuilding in 1981, track repairs in 1985, and modifications in 1995 to accommodate the requirements for J.League soccer.

The stadium was the main venue for the World Games 2001. It also hosted the National Sports Festival of Japan in 1961 and 2007. It is the home stadium for the Blaublitz Akita, a J.League team.

== Naming rights ==
The oldest and largest stadium in Akita was renamed in April 2019 when the Soyu Corporation purchased the naming rights. The agreement was reported as being worth 3.5 million yen per year.

Soyu Corporation logo

== Gallery ==
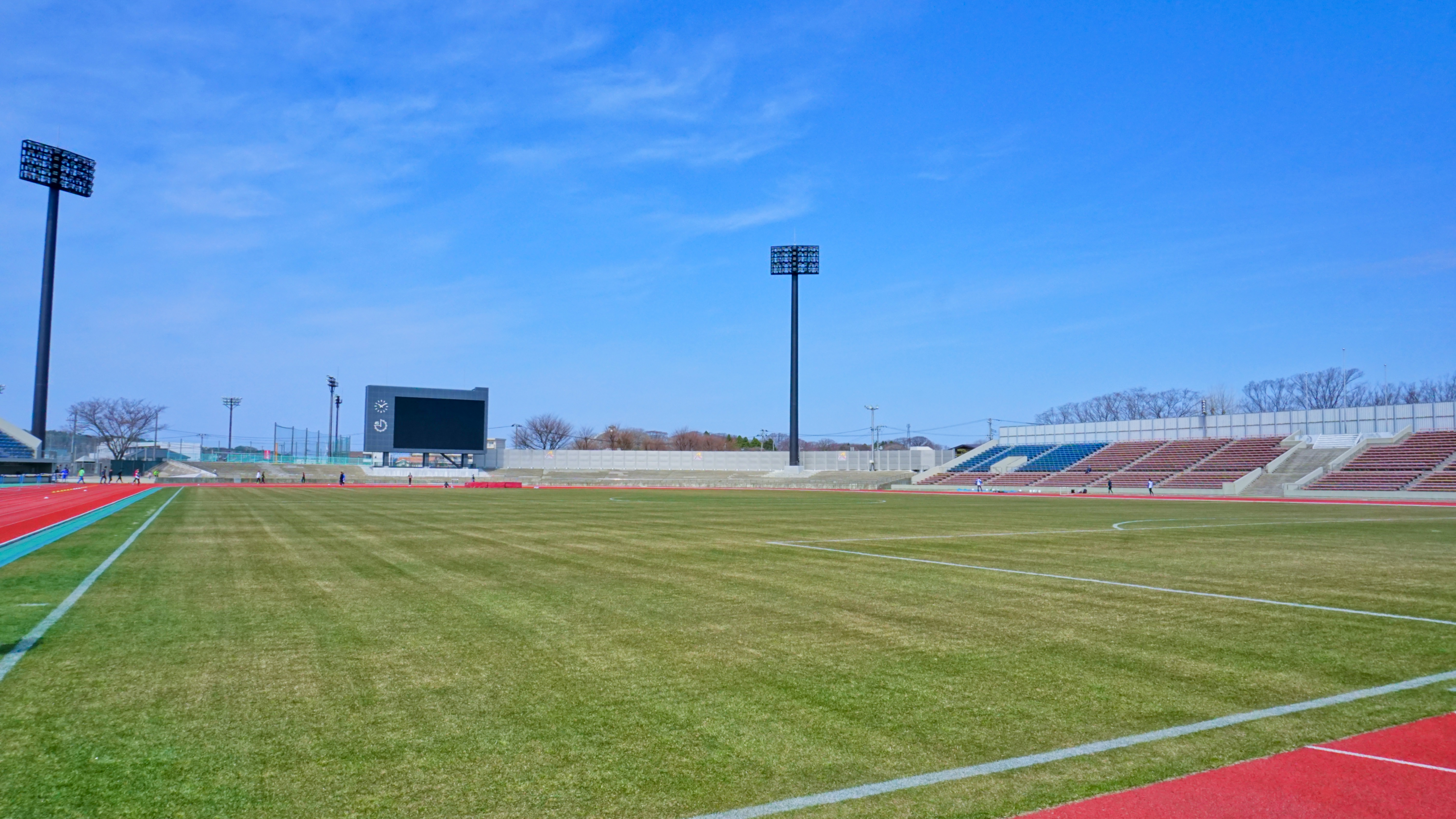
Four 40.75-meter-tall Panasonic 45-LED-bulb light towers were installed in 2019 to meet the J2 license requirements (JPY 530 million)

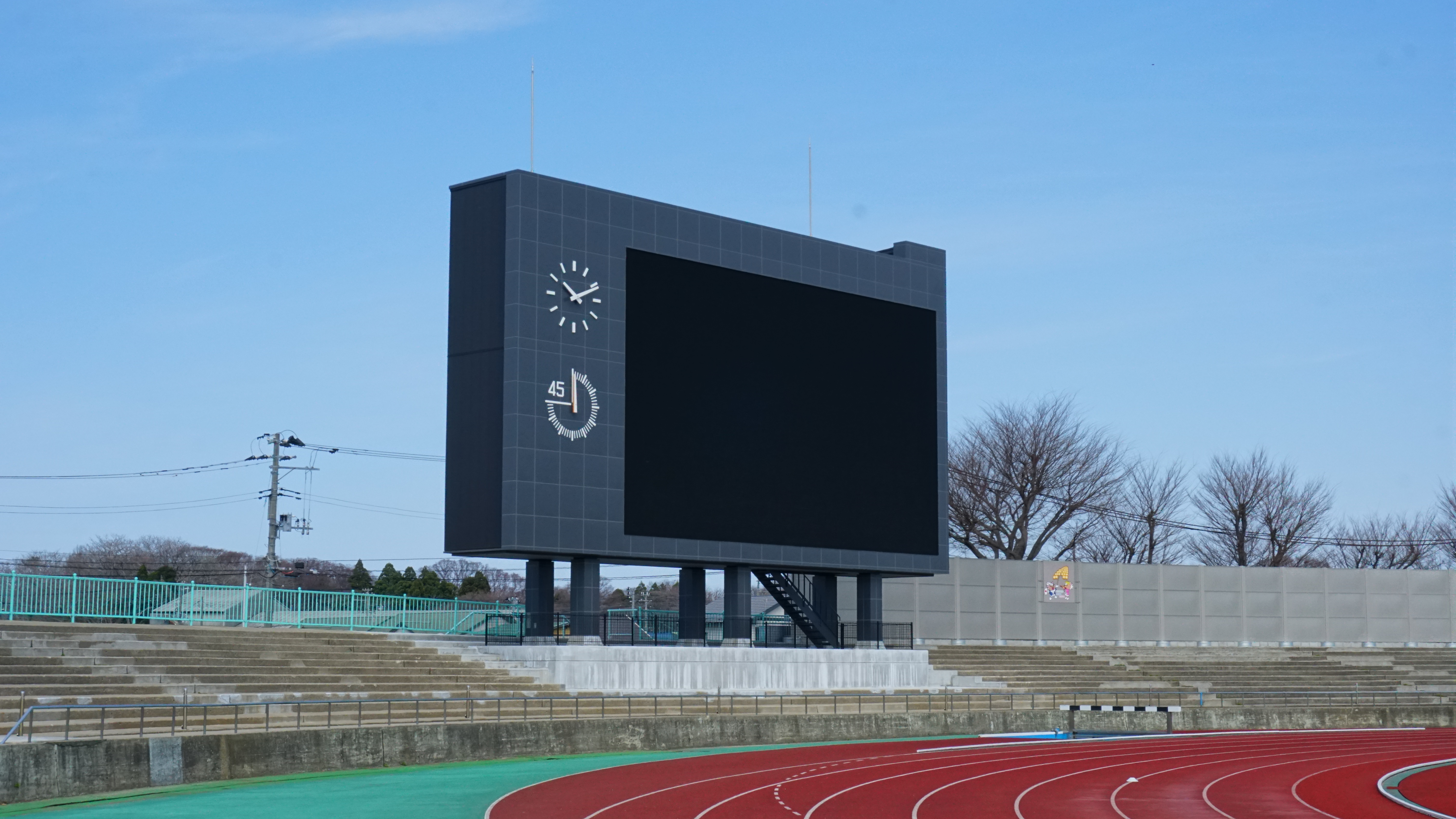
Panasonic scoreboard (JPY 400 million)

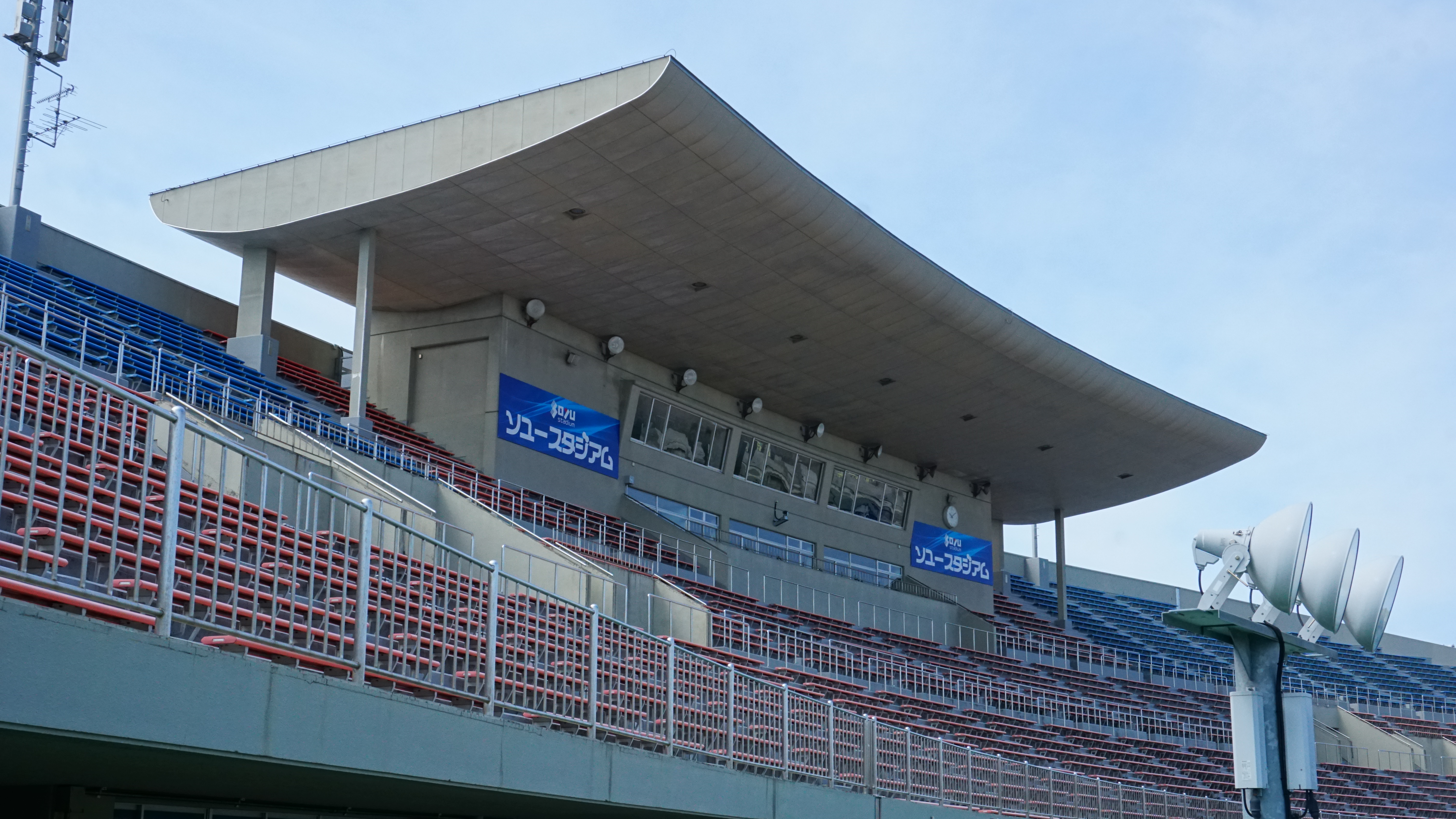
Broadcast booth

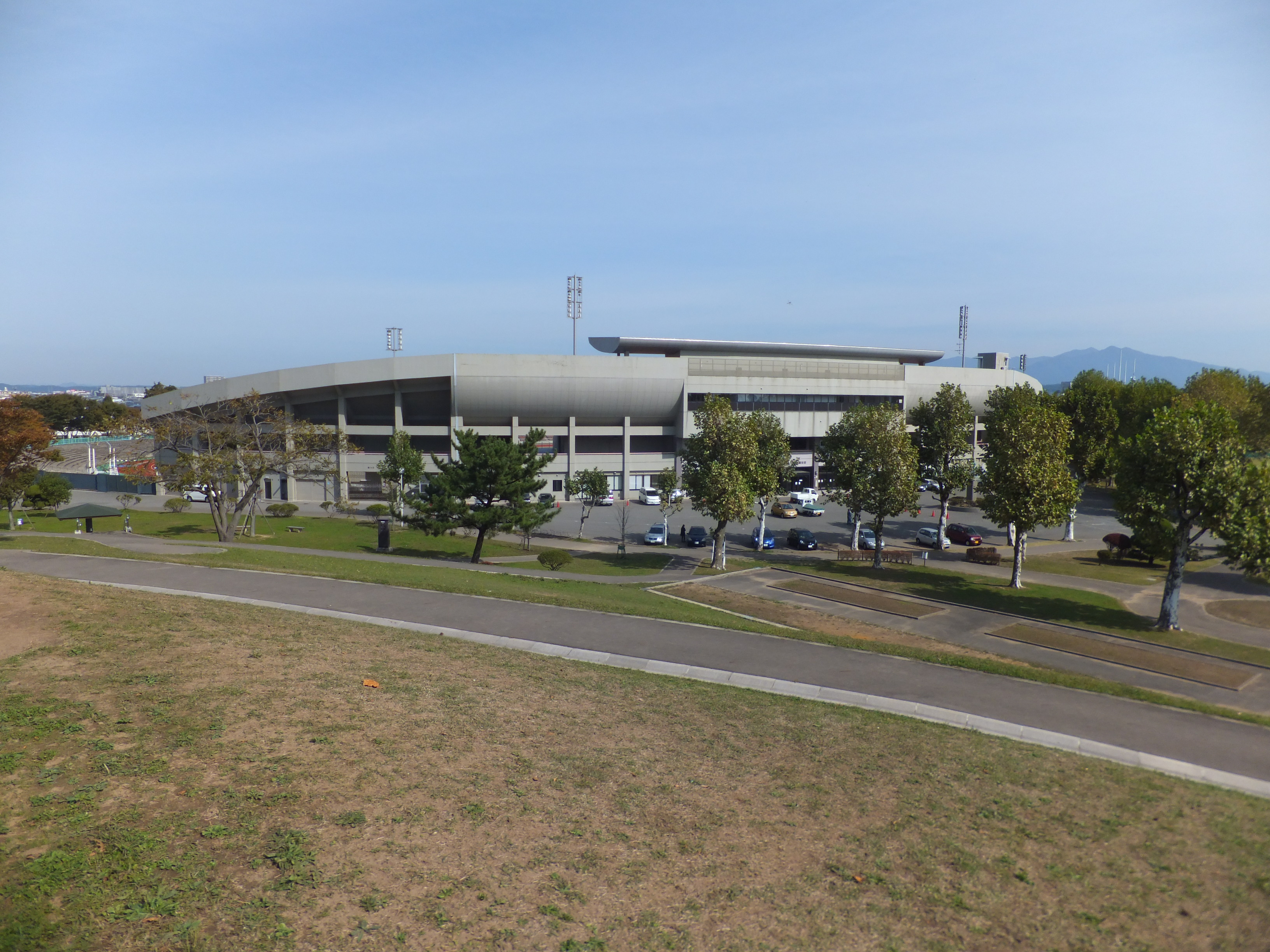

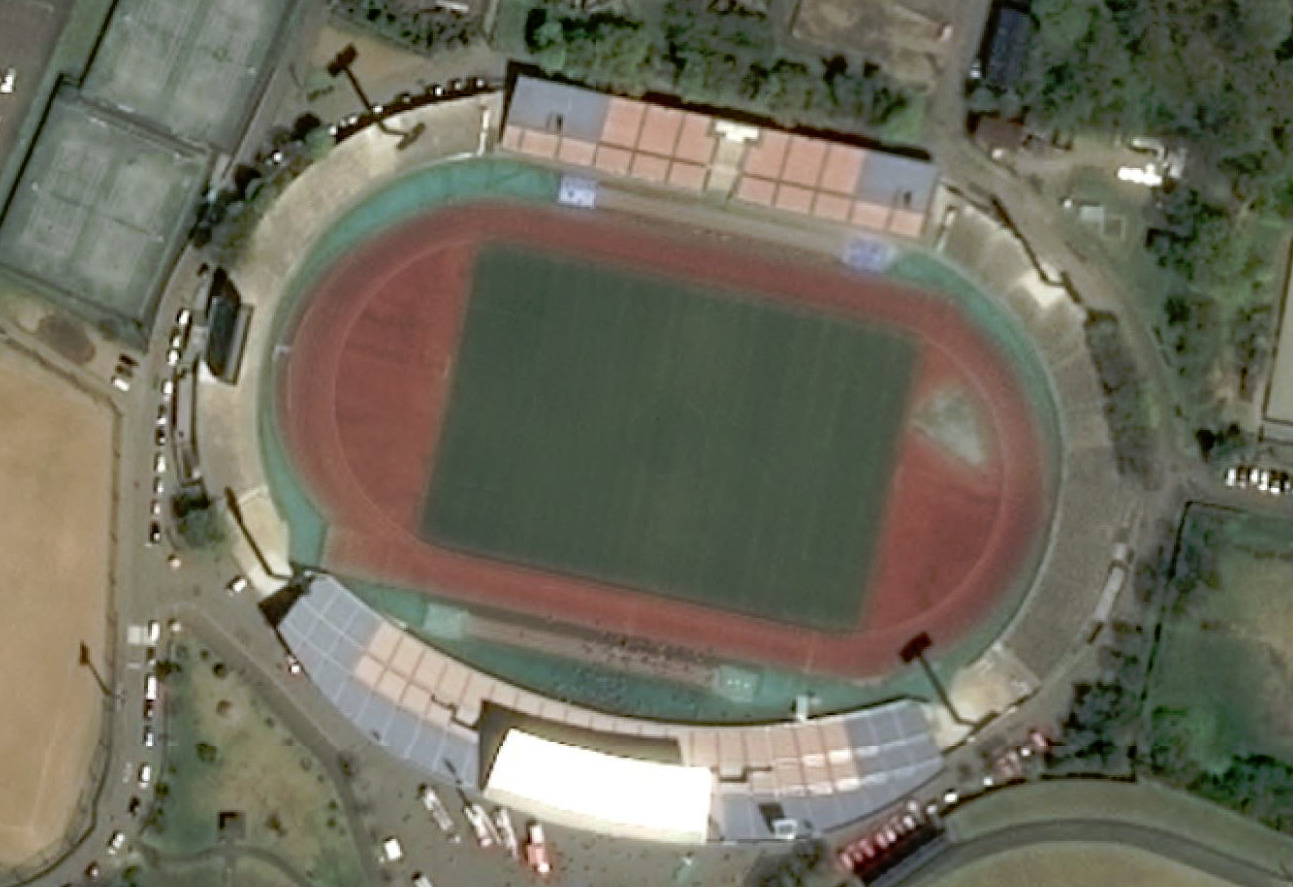
Satellite view

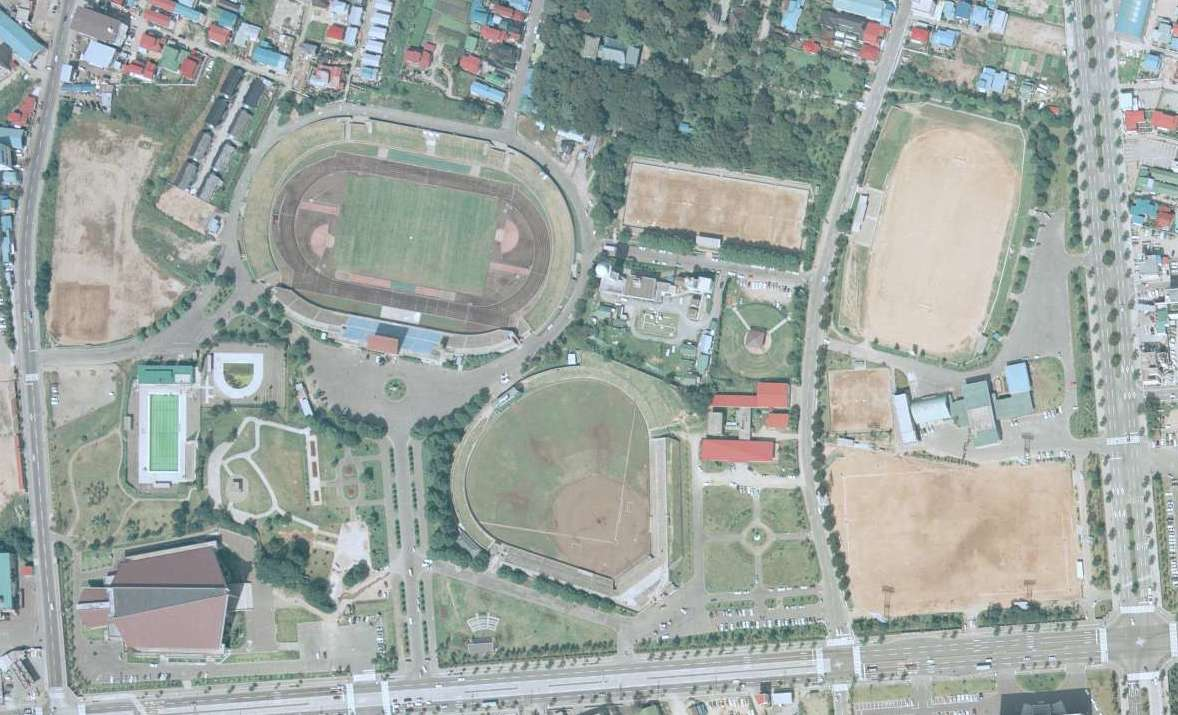
Yabase Sports Park in 1975

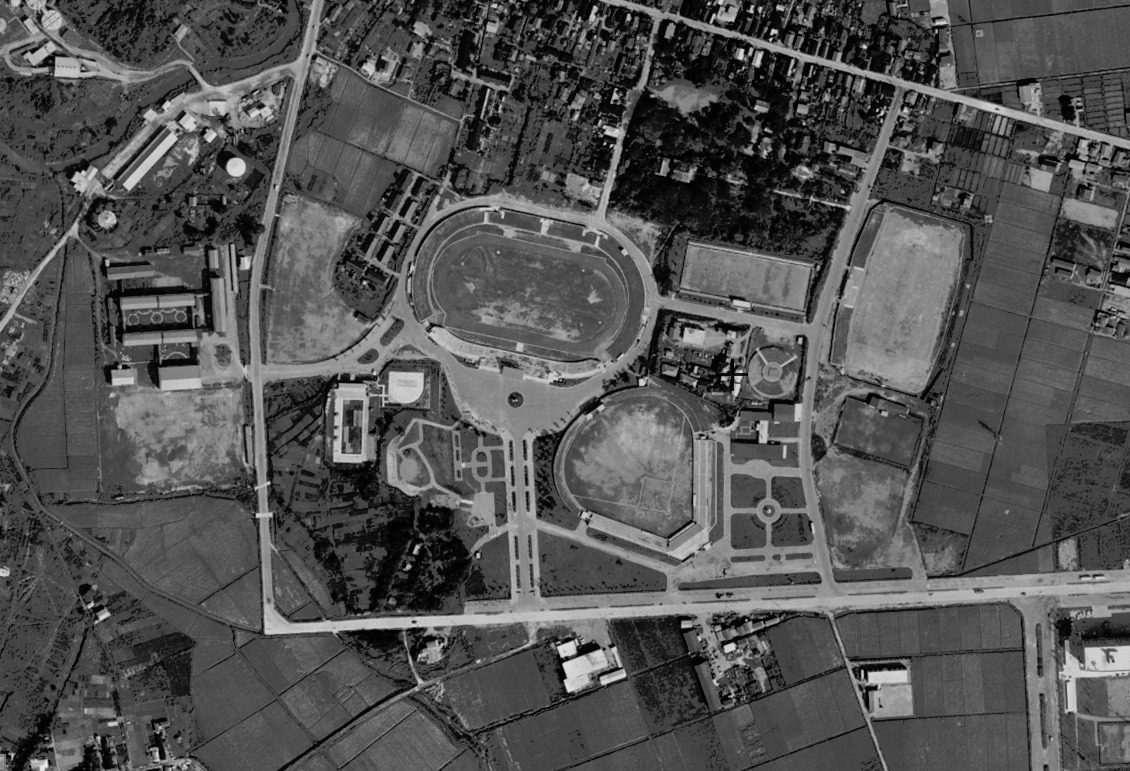
Yabase Sports Park in 1960s

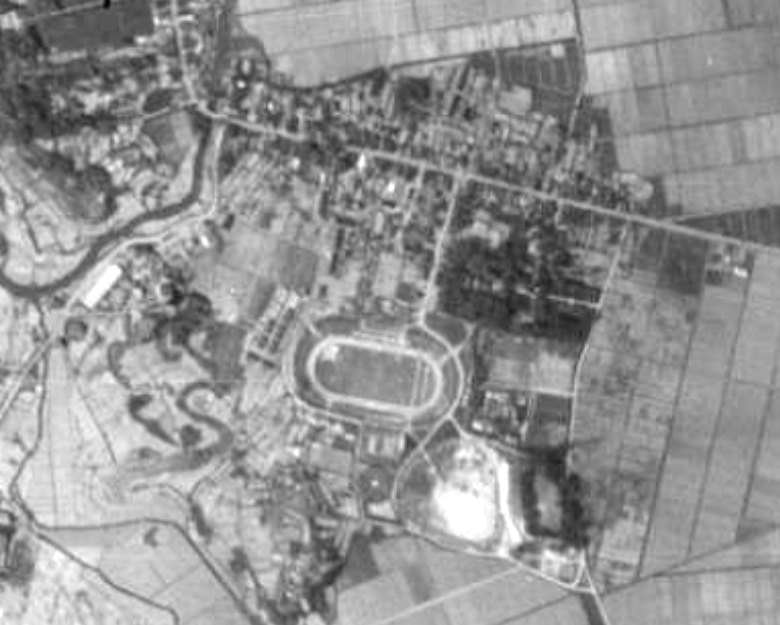
Yabase Sports Park in 1948

== Access ==
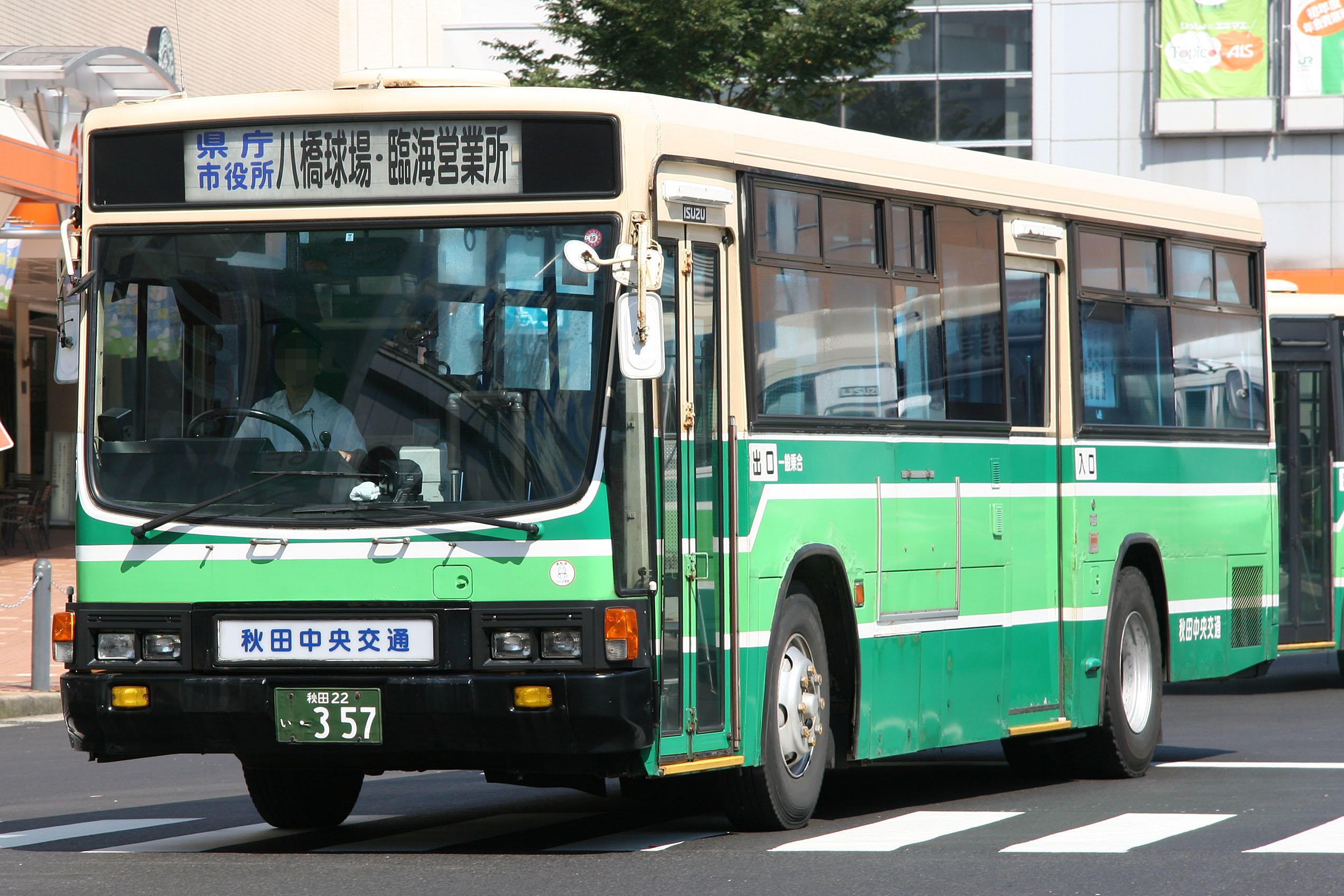
Chuo Kotsu bus

- From Akita Station: Akita Chūō Kōtsū for Rinkai Eigyosho, Tsuchizaki via Terauchi etc. Get off at Yabase Kyujo-mae.
- Access to Soyu Stadium

== Location map ==
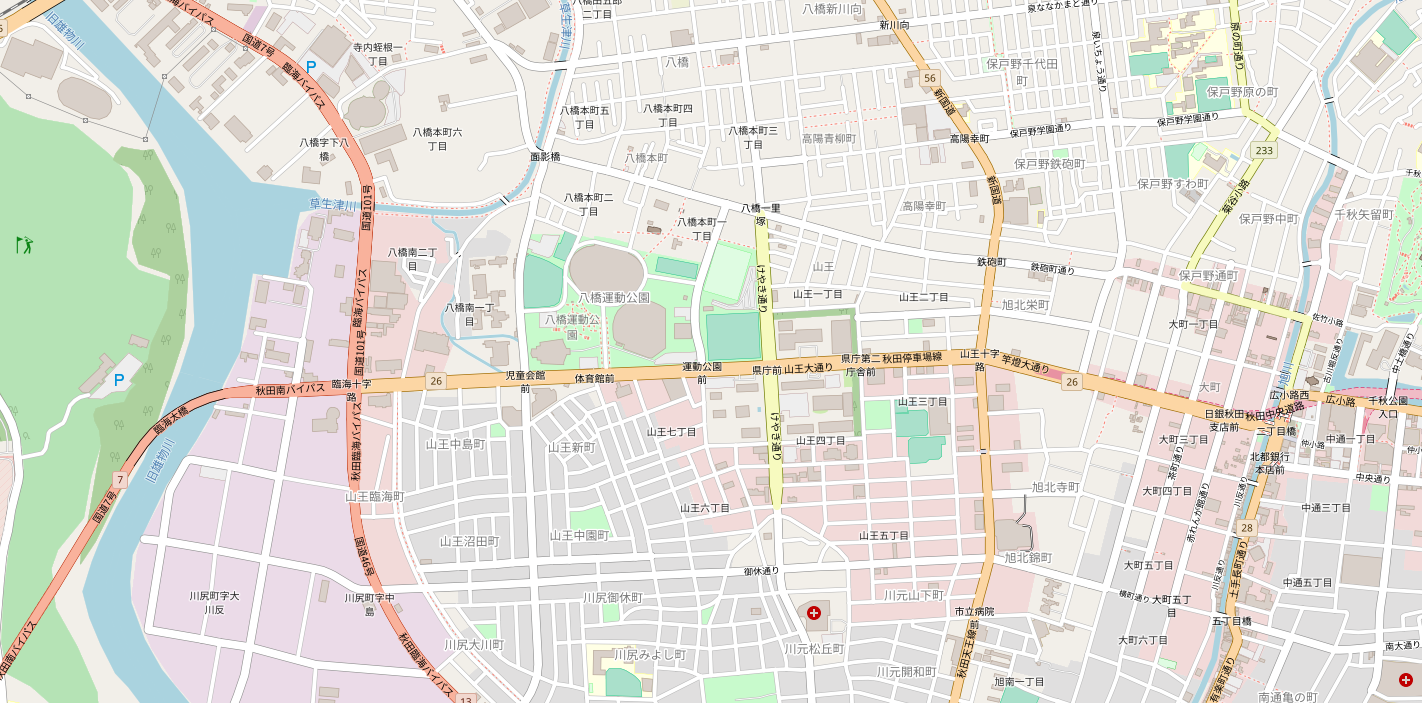
Soyu Stadium (Akita, Akita)
