= Kosuke Iwase =

Japanese footballer (born 1981)

Personal information
- Full name: Kosuke Iwase
- Date of birth: April 8, 1981 (age 45)
- Place of birth: Kamisu, Ibaraki, Japan
- Height: 1.80 m (5 ft 11 in)
- Position: Defender

Youth career
- 2001–2004: Nihon University

Senior career*
Years	Team	Apps	(Gls)
2005–2006	Sagawa Express Tokyo SC	0	(0)
2006–2009	TDK SC	74	(2)
2010	Blaublitz Akita	18	(0)
Total		92	(2)
- * Club domestic league appearances and goals as of 23 February 2018

Kosuke Iwase (岩瀬浩介, Iwase Kosuke; born April 8, 1981 in Ibaraki) is a Japanese former professional football player.

He is currently the chairman of the Blaublitz Akita, a Japanese association football team based in Akita, Akita.
