= 2024 Blaublitz Akita season =

Blaublitz Akita
2024 season
- Manager: Ken Yoshida
- Stadium: Soyu Stadium
- J2 League: 9th
- Emperor's Cup: Pre-season
- J.League Cup: Round 2
- Top goalscorer: League: Daiki Sato (4 goals); All: Daiki Sato (5 goals)
- Highest home attendance: 6,256
- Lowest home attendance: 1,335
Home colours	Away colours
- All statistics correct as of 21:50, 15 April 2024 (UTC).

Blaublitz Akita played its 59th season in 2024, the club's fourth season in a row in the J2 League. As well as the domestic league, they competed in the Emperor's Cup and the J.League Cup.

== Squad ==
=== Season squad ===
Squad no.	Name	Nationality	Date of birth (age at start of season)
Goalkeepers
1	Genki Yamada	(Japan)	16 December 1996 (aged 27)
23	Soki Yatagai	(Japan)	11 June 1998 (aged 25)
31	Kentaro Kakoi	(Japan)	23 April 1991 (aged 32)
41	Kosuke Inose	(Japan)	25 December 2000 (aged 23)
47	Tomoki Horiuchi ^{Type 2}	(Japan)	17 December 2006 (aged 17)
Defenders
2	Ryohei Okazaki	(Japan)	25 April 1992 (aged 31)
3	Tatsushi Koyanagi	(Japan)	7 February 1990 (aged 34)
4	Koji Hachisuka	(Japan)	20 July 1990 (aged 33)
5	Takashi Kawano	(Japan)	17 June 1996 (aged 27)
13	Ryuji Saito	(Japan)	12 March 1993 (aged 30)
16	Kota Muramatsu	(South Korea)	22 August 1997 (aged 26)
27	Keita Yoshioka	(Japan)	5 October 1997 (aged 26)
39	Kyowaan Hoshi	(Japan)	25 June 1997 (aged 26)
88	Kenichi Kaga	(Japan)	30 September 1983 (aged 40)
Midfielders
6	Hiroto Morooka (c)	(Japan)	4 January 1997 (aged 27)
7	Takuma Mizutani	(Japan)	24 April 1996 (aged 27)
9	Ryota Nakamura	(Japan)	28 January 1991 (aged 33)
14	Ryuhei Oishi	(Japan)	21 January 1997 (aged 27)
20	Hiroki Kurimoto	(Japan)	16 June 1990 (aged 33)
25	Tomofumi Fujiyama	(Japan)	23 April 1994 (aged 29)
45	Hinase Suzuki	(Japan)	22 December 2004 (aged 19)
80	Kazuya Onohara	(Japan)	16 April 1996 (aged 27)
Forwards
8	Junki Hata	(Japan)	14 April 1994 (aged 29)
10	Ren Komatsu	(Japan)	10 September 1998 (aged 25)
11	Yukihito Kajiya	(Japan)	9 March 2000 (aged 23)
15	Shion Niwa	(Japan)	18 June 1994 (aged 29)
17	Koya Handa	(Japan)	27 September 1998 (aged 25)
18	Ibuki Yoshida	(Japan)	1 November 1997 (aged 26)
29	Daiki Sato	(Japan)	23 April 1999 (aged 24)
40	Shota Aoki	(Japan)	11 August 1990 (aged 33)
42	Ken Tshizanga Matsumoto	(Japan)	14 March 2002 (aged 21)

Last updated: 1 March 2024.
Source: Blaublitz Akita website

== Transfers ==
=== Arrivals ===
Date	Position	Player	From	Type	Source
4 August 2023	FW	(Japan) Ken Tshizanga Matsumoto	(Japan) Komazawa University	Full	
20 December 2023	FW	(Japan) Yukihito Kajiya	(Japan) Sagan Tosu	Full	
21 December 2023	FW	(Japan) Shion Niwa	(Japan) Zweigen Kanazawa	Full	
21 December 2023	FW	(Japan) Ren Komatsu	(Japan) Matsumoto Yamaga	Full	
22 December 2023	DF	(Japan) Kota Muramatsu	(Japan) V-Varen Nagasaki	Full	
22 December 2023	FW	(Japan) Koya Handa	(Japan) Verspah Oita	Loan return	
25 December 2023	DF	(Japan) Keita Yoshioka	(Japan) Montedio Yamagata	Loan	
26 December 2023	MF	(Japan) Hiroki Kurimoto	(Japan) Omiya Ardija	Full	
28 December 2023	GK	(Japan) Soki Yatagai	(Japan) AC Nagano Parceiro	Full	
29 December 2023	DF	(Japan) Ryohei Okazaki	(Japan) Tochigi SC	Full	
30 December 2023	DF	(Japan) Koji Hachisuka	(Japan) Vegalta Sendai	Full	
4 January 2024	MF	(Japan) Kazuya Onohara	(Japan) Zweigen Kanazawa	Loan	
8 January 2024	FW	(Japan) Daiki Sato	(Japan) FC Machida Zelvia	Loan	
14 January 2024	GK	(Japan) Kosuke Inose	(Japan) SC Sagamihara	Loan	
29 February 2024	MF	(Japan) Ryuhei Oishi	(Japan) Zweigen Kanazawa	Full	

=== Departures ===
Date	Position	Player	To	Type	Source
10 November 2023	MF	(Japan) Hiroto Tanaka		Retired	
13 November 2023	MF	(Japan) Yosuke Mikami		Released	
22 November 2023	MF	(Japan) Masaki Okino		Released	
15 December 2023	DF	(Japan) Ryutaro Iio	(Japan) V-Varen Nagasaki	Full	
17 December 2023	MF	(Japan) Daiki Kogure	(Japan) Iwate Grulla Morioka	Full	
19 December 2023	DF	(Japan) Kaito Abe	(Japan) Fagiano Okayama	Loan return	
19 December 2023	DF	(Japan) Ryota Takada	(Japan) Vegalta Sendai	Full	
19 December 2023	DF	(Japan) Yuji Fujita	(Japan) FC Osaka	Full	
20 December 2023	MF	(Japan) Keita Saito	(Japan) Fagiano Okayama	Full	
26 December 2023	MF	(Japan) Naoki Inoue	(Japan) Kataller Toyama	Full	
27 December 2023	GK	(Japan) Akihito Ozawa	(Japan) FC Imabari	Loan	
31 December 2023	FW	(Japan) Hayate Take	(Japan) FC Osaka	Full	
6 January 2024	GK	(Japan) Yuki Yasuda	(Australia) Fernhill	Full	
9 January 2024	DF	(Japan) Yuzuru Yoshimura	(Japan) Nara Club	Full	
15 February 2024	MF	(Japan) Yōsuke Mikami		Retired	
17 March 2024	MF	(Japan) Mouhamadou War	(United States) Los Angeles Force	Full	

== Pre-season matches ==
24 January 2024 Friendly	Blaublitz Akita	0–0	Kochi United SC	Haruno
10:00 UTC+9		Report		Stadium: Kochi Haruno Athletic Stadium
Note: 25 minutes

24 January 2024 Friendly	Blaublitz Akita	2–0	Kochi United SC	Haruno
	Komatsu; Niwa	Report		Stadium: Kochi Haruno Athletic Stadium
Note: 25 minutes

24 January 2024 Friendly	Blaublitz Akita	0–1	Kochi United SC	Haruno
		Report		Stadium: Kochi Haruno Athletic Stadium
Note: 25 minutes

31 January 2024 Friendly	Ehime FC	0–0	Blaublitz Akita	Haruno
13:00 UTC+9		Report		Stadium: Kochi Haruno Athletic Stadium
Note: 35 minutes

31 January 2024 Friendly	Ehime FC	1–0	Blaublitz Akita	Haruno
	16'	Report		Stadium: Kochi Haruno Athletic Stadium
Note: 35 minutes

31 January 2024 Friendly	Ehime FC	0–1	Blaublitz Akita	Haruno
		Report	Niwa 21'	Stadium: Kochi Haruno Athletic Stadium
Note: 35 minutes

4 February 2024 Friendly	Blaublitz Akita	0–1	FC Osaka	Haruno
11:00 UTC+9		Report		Stadium: Kochi Haruno Athletic Stadium
Note: 35 minutes

4 February 2024 Friendly	Blaublitz Akita	0–1	FC Osaka	Haruno
		Report		Stadium: Kochi Haruno Athletic Stadium
Note: 35 minutes

4 February 2024 Friendly	Blaublitz Akita	0–1	FC Osaka	Haruno
		Report		Stadium: Kochi Haruno Athletic Stadium
Note: 35 minutes

== Competitions ==
=== Overall record ===
Competition	First match	Last match	Starting round	Final position	Record							
Competition	First match	Last match	Starting round	Final position	Pld	W	D	L	GF	GA	GD	Win %
J2 League	25 February 2024		Matchday 1		17	6	5	6	19	17	+2	35.29
Emperor's Cup					0	0	0	0	0	0	+0	—
J.League Cup	6 March 2024	22 May 2024	Round 1	Round 3	3	2	0	1	4	3	+1	66.67
Total					20	8	5	7	23	20	+3	40.00

Last updated: 26 May 2024
Source: Competitions

=== J2 League ===
==== Table ====
Pos	Team	Pld	W	D	L	GF	GA	GD	Pts
8	Tokushima Vortis	38	16	7	15	42	44	−2	55
9	Iwaki FC	38	15	9	14	53	41	+12	54
10	Blaublitz Akita	38	15	9	14	36	35	+1	54
11	Renofa Yamaguchi	38	15	8	15	43	44	−1	53
12	Roasso Kumamoto	38	13	7	18	53	62	−9	46

Source: Meiji Yasuda J2 League, J.League Data Site
Rules for classification: 1) Points; 2) Goal difference; 3) Goals scored; 4) Head-to-head points; 5) Head-to-head goal difference; 6) Head-to-head goal scored; 7) Fair-play points.

==== Results summary ====
Overall								Home						Away					
Pld	W	D	L	GF	GA	GD	Pts	W	D	L	GF	GA	GD	W	D	L	GF	GA	GD
12	5	3	4	12	10	+2	18	2	3	1	5	3	+2	3	0	3	7	7	0

Last updated: 28 April 2024.
Source: Worldfootball

==== Results by round ====
Round	1	2	3	4	5	6	7	8	9	10	11	12
Ground	A	A	A	H	H	A	H	H	A	H	A	H
Result	L	L	W	D	W	L	W	D	W	D	W	L
Position	17	18	16	15	9	12	10	11	6	8	6	9

Updated to match(es) played on 28 April 2024. Source: Worldfootball
A = Away; H = Home; W = Win; D = Draw; L = Loss

==== Matches ====
The full league fixtures were released on 23 January 2024.

25 February 1	Ehime FC	1–0	Blaublitz Akita	Matsuyama
12:53 UTC+9	Kubota 29'	Report		Stadium: Ningineer Stadium; Attendance: 5,193; Referee: Yusuke Ohashi

3 March 2	Renofa Yamaguchi	2–0	Blaublitz Akita	Yamaguchi
13:02 UTC+9	Umeki 7'; Kobayashi 88'	Report	Yoshioka (red card) 75'	Stadium: Ishin Me-Life Stadium; Attendance: 8,906; Referee: Tomohiro Inoue

9 March 3	Tokushima Vortis	1–2	Blaublitz Akita	Naruto
14:03 UTC+9	Komatsu (o.g.)	Report	Sato 68'; Onohara 84'	Stadium: Pocarisweat Stadium; Attendance: 4,044; Referee: Hirokazu Otsubo

16 March 4	Blaublitz Akita	0–0	Vegalta Sendai	Akita
14:03 UTC+9		Report		Stadium: Soyu Stadium; Attendance: 6,256; Referee: Tetsuro Yoshida

20 March 5	Blaublitz Akita	3–0	Tochigi SC	Akita
14:03 UTC+9	Sato 49'; Kawano 62'; Yoshioka 71'	Report		Stadium: Soyu Stadium; Attendance: 3,002; Referee: Masuya Ueda

24 March 6	Shimizu S-Pulse	1–0	Blaublitz Akita	Shizuoka
14:03 UTC+9	Kitagawa 26'	Report		Stadium: IAI Stadium Nihondaira; Attendance: 12,646; Referee: Yoshiro Imamura

30 March 7	Blaublitz Akita	1–0	Iwaki FC	Akita
14:03 JST	Kawano 16'	Report		Stadium: Soyu Stadium; Attendance: 2,509; Referee: Koki Nagamine

3 April 8	Blaublitz Akita	1–1	Mito HollyHock	Akita
19:03 JST	Sato 69'	Report	Nagai 19'	Stadium: Soyu Stadium; Attendance: 2,220; Referee: Genki Tawara

7 April 9	Oita Trinita	1–3	Blaublitz Akita	Ōita
14:03 UTC+9	Watanabe 40'	Report	Sato 4'; Kajiya 13' (pen.); Niwa (yellow card) 34' (yellow-red card) 38'; Aoki 90+1'	Stadium: Resonac Dome Oita; Attendance: 7,347; Referee: Yusuke Ohashi

14 April 10	Blaublitz Akita	0–0	Fagiano Okayama	Akita
14:03 JST		Report		Stadium: Soyu Stadium; Attendance: 3,332; Referee: Yoshikazu Matsuzawa

21 April 11	JEF United Chiba	1–2	Blaublitz Akita	Chiba
14:03 UTC+9	Taguchi 66'	Report	Hachisuka (yellow card) 20' (yellow-red card) 47'; Handa 90'; Saito 90+7'	Stadium: Fukuda Denshi Arena; Attendance: 8,920; Referee: Keisuke Nobori

28 April 12	Blaublitz Akita	0–2	Yokohama FC	Akita
14:03 JST		Report	22' (o.g.); Yamane 76'	Stadium: Soyu Stadium; Attendance: 4,238; Referee: Kazuyoshi Enomoto
Note: Some sources such as Soccerway have awarded the own goal to Towa Yamane.

=== J.League Cup ===
6 March First round – Match 1	Kamatamare Sanuki	0–2	Blaublitz Akita	Marugame
19:00 UTC+9			Sato 35'; Niwa 90+2'	Stadium: Pikara Stadium; Referee: Yūzō Sudani

24 April First round – Match 2	Blaublitz Akita	2–1 (a.e.t.)	Shonan Bellmare	Akita
19:03	Aoki 74'; Komatsu 97'	Report	Fukuda 54'	Stadium: Soyu Stadium; Attendance: 1,335; Referee: Yoshimi Yamashita

22 May First round – Match 3	Blaublitz Akita	0–2 (a.e.t.)	Albirex Niigata	Akita
19:03		Report	Ishiyama 99'; Okumura 111'	Stadium: Soyu Stadium; Attendance: 2,810; Referee: Jumpei Iida
