= List of Albirex Niigata seasons =

This is a list of seasons played by Albirex Niigata in Japanese football, from their first competitive to the most recent completed season. It details the club's achievements in major competitions, as well as the club's average attendance and top scorers for each season since 1999. Players in bold were also top scorers in their league that season.

== Seasons ==
Champions	Runners-up	Promoted	Relegated

Season	League									Cup		Top goalscorer(s)	
Season	Division	Tier	Position	Pld	W	D	L	Pts	Attendance/G	J.League Cup	Emperor's Cup	Name	Goals
1986	Hokushin'etsu	3	**1st**	9	8	1	0	17	–	–	Did not qualify		
1987	Hokushin'etsu	3	**3rd**	9	3	4	2	10	–	–	1st round		
1988	Hokushin'etsu	3	**4th**	9	4	2	3	10	–	–	Did not qualify		
1989	Hokushin'etsu	3	**8th**	9	2	1	6	5	–	–	Did not qualify		
1990	Hokushin'etsu	3	**3rd**	9	4	2	3	10	–	–	Did not qualify		
1991	Hokushin'etsu	3	**3rd**	9	5	3	1	13	–	–	Did not qualify		
1992	Hokushin'etsu	3	**2nd**	9	6	2	1	14	–	–	Did not qualify		
1993	Hokushin'etsu	3	**4th**	9	4	1	4	9	–	–	Did not qualify		
1994	Hokushin'etsu	3	**4th**	9	4	1	4	9	–	–	Did not qualify		
1995	Hokushin'etsu	3	**3rd**	9	7	1	1	22	–	–	Did not qualify		
1996	Hokushin'etsu	3	**1st**	9	8	1	0	25	–	–	1st round		
1997	Hokushin'etsu	3	**1st**	9	9	0	0	27	–	–	2nd round		
1998	JFL	2	**11th**	30	12	0	18	34	2,696	–	3rd round		
1999	J.League 2	2	**4th**	36	22	2	14	58	4,211	1st round	3rd round	(Japan) Shingo Suzuki	8
2000	J.League 2	2	**7th**	45	15	5	20	46	4,007	1st round	3rd round	(Japan) Naoki Naruo	17
2001	J.League 2	2	**4th**	44	26	4	14	78	16,659	1st round	4th round	(Japan) Hisashi Kurosaki	21
2002	J.League 2	2	**3rd**	44	23	13	8	82	21,478	–	3rd round	(Brazil) **Marcus**	19
2003	J.League 2	2	**1st**	44	27	7	10	88	30,339	–	4th round	(Brazil) **Marcus**	32
2004	J.League 1	1	**10th**	30	10	7	13	37	37,689	Group stage	4th round	(Brazil) Edmilson	15
2005	J.League 1	1	**12th**	34	11	9	14	42	40,114	Group stage	5th round	(Brazil) Edmilson	18
2006	J.League 1	1	**14th**	34	12	6	16	42	38,709	Group stage	5th round	(Brazil) Edmilson	10
2007	J.League 1	1	**6th**	34	15	6	13	51	38,276	Group stage	4th round	(Brazil) Edmilson	19
2008	J.League 1	1	**13th**	34	11	9	14	42	34,490	Group stage	5th round	(Brazil) Alessandro	13
2009	J.League 1	1	**8th**	34	13	11	10	50	33,446	Group stage	Quarter final	(Brazil) Pedro Júnior (Brazil) Márcio Richardes	10
2010	J.League 1	1	**9th**	34	12	13	9	49	30,542	Group stage	4th round	(Brazil) Márcio Richardes	16
2011	J.League 1	1	**14th**	34	10	9	15	39	26,049	Quarter final	3rd round	(Brazil) Bruno Lopes	13
2012	J.League 1	1	**15th**	34	10	10	14	40	25,018	Group stage	3rd round	(Brazil) Bruno Lopes	7
2013	J.League 1	1	**7th**	34	17	4	13	55	26,112	Group stage	3rd round	(Japan) Kengo Kawamata	23
2014	J.League 1	1	**12th**	34	12	8	14	44	22,979	Group stage	3rd round	(Brazil) Léo Silva	6
2015	J.League 1	1	**15th**	34	8	10	16	34	23,444	Semi final	3rd round	(Japan) Hiroshi Ibusuki (Brazil) Rafael Silva	7
2016	J.League 1	1	**18th**	34	4	7	23	19	22,625	Group stage	4th round	(Brazil) Rafael Silva	11
2017	J.League 1	1	**17th**	34	7	7	20	28	22,034	Group stage	3rd round	(Brazil) Rony	7
2018	J.League 2	2	**16th**	42	15	8	19	53	14,913	Group stage	3rd round	(Japan) Arata Watanabe	10
2019	J.League 2	2	**10th**	42	17	11	14	62	14,402	–	2nd round	(Brazil) Leonardo	28
2020 †	J.League 2	2	**11th**	42	14	5	13	57	5,360	–	Did not qualify	(North Korea) Chong Tese	9
2021	J.League 2	2	**6th**	42	18	14	10	68	10,879	–	3rd round	(Japan) Kaito Taniguchi	13
2022	J.League 2	2	**1st**	42	25	9	8	84	14,954	–	2nd round	(Japan) Kaito Taniguchi (Japan) Ryōtarō Itō	9
2023	J1 League	1	10th	34	11	12	11	45	23,061	Group stage	Quarter-finals	(Japan) Ryōtarō Itō	7
2024	J1 League	1	16th	38	10	12	16	42	22,430	Runner up	3rd round	(Japan) Kaito Taniguchi	10
2025	J1 League	1											

Key

- **Pos**. = Position in league; **GP** = Games played; **W** = Games won; **D** = Games drawn; **L** = Games lost; **Pts** = Points gained
- **Attendance/G** = Average home league attendance
- † 2020 season attendance reduced by COVID-19 worldwide pandemic
- Source: J.League Data Site
