= Haruno =

Haruno (written: 春野 or 榛野) is a Japanese surname. Notable people with the surname include:

- Anzu Haruno (春野 杏, born 1994), Japanese voice actress
- Nanae Haruno (榛野 なな恵,), Japanese manga artist
- Sumire Haruno (春野 寿美礼; born 1972), Japanese actress

Haruno is also a Japanese given name, typically used for females, and can be written with various kanji combinations. Notable people with the name include:

- Haruno Nemoto (根本 葉瑠乃; born 1995), Japanese women's basketball player
- Ōkubo Haruno (大久保 春野; 1846–1915), Japanese general
- Haruno Sasaki (佐々木 春乃; born 1995), Japanese handball player

== Fictional characters ==
- Haruno Yukinoshita (雪ノ下陽乃), a character in the light novel My Youth Romantic Comedy Is Wrong, as I Expected
- Haruka Haruno (春野はるか), the main protagonist of Go! Princess PreCure
- Sakura Haruno (春野 サクラ), a main character in the manga series Naruto
- Giorno Giovanna, the protagonist in the fifth JoJo's Bizarre Adventure story arc Golden Wind, whose name was originally Haruno Shiobana (汐華 初流乃) before changing his name when he moved to Italy.

== See also ==
- Haruno, Kōchi, a former town in Agawa District, Kōchi Prefecture, Japan
  - Haruno Stadium, a football stadium in Haruno, Kōchi, Japan
- Haruno, Shizuoka, a former town in Shūchi District, Shizuoka Prefecture, Japan
