= Kazuya Onohara =

Japanese professional footballer

Personal information
- Date of birth: 16 April 1996 (age 30)
- Place of birth: Hirakata, Osaka, Japan
- Height: 1.72 m (5 ft 8 in)
- Position: Midfielder

Team information
- Current team: Oliveirense
- Number: 80

Youth career
- Avanti Hirakata
- –2011: Seirei JFC
- 2012–2014: Júbilo Iwata

College career
Years	Team	Apps	(Gls)
2015–2018	Ryutsu Keizai University		

Senior career*
Years	Team	Apps	(Gls)
2019–2020	Renofa Yamaguchi	13	(0)
2020–2021	Oliveirense	23	(2)
2022–	Zweigen Kanazawa	65	(2)
2024–2025	→ Blaublitz Akita (loan)	31	(1)
2025–2026	Blaublitz Akita	15	(1)
2026–	Oliveirense	3	(0)
- * Club domestic league appearances and goals as of 20 June 2026

Kazuya Onohara (小野原 和哉, Onohara Kazuya; born 16 April 1996) is a Japanese professional footballer who plays as a midfielder for Portuguese Liga 3 club Oliveirense.

== Club career ==
On 31 January 2026, Onohara returned to Portugal for a second spell at Liga Portugal 2 club Oliveirense.
