= Ren Komatsu =

Japanese footballer (born 1998)

Ren Komatsu 小松 蓮
Personal information
- Date of birth: 10 September 1998 (age 28)
- Place of birth: Tokyo, Japan
- Height: 1.83 m (6 ft 0 in)
- Position: Forward

Team information
- Current team: Vissel Kobe
- Number: 29

Youth career
- –2010: Suwa FC
- 2011–2016: Matsumoto Yamaga

College career
Years	Team	Apps	(Gls)
2017–2018	Sanno Institute of Management		

Senior career*
Years	Team	Apps	(Gls)
2018–2023	Matsumoto Yamaga	50	(20)
2019	→ Zweigen Kanazawa (loan)	22	(5)
2020–2021	→ Renofa Yamaguchi (loan)	57	(3)
2024–2025	Blaublitz Akita	60	(16)
2025–	Vissel Kobe	21	(5)

International career
2017	Japan U-19	3	(0)
2017–2019	Japan U-23	5	(1)
- * Club domestic league appearances and goals as of 10 August 2026

Ren Komatsu (小松 蓮, Komatsu Ren; born 10 September 1998) is a Japanese professional footballer who plays as a forward for J1 League club Vissel Kobe.

== Career ==
=== Matsumoto Yamaga ===
On 25 March 2016, Komatsu was registered as a Type 2 player for Matsumoto, but was not promoted to the first team. On 9 March 2018, after gaining experience playing a year of university football for Sanno University, he returned to Matsumoto Yamaga ahead of the 2018 season. On 10 December 2021, it was announced that Komatsu would return to Matsumoto for the 2022 season. He made his league debut against Kamatamare Sanuki on 13 March 2022. Komatsu scored his first league goal against YSCC Yokohama on 20 March 2022, scoring in the 65th minute.

During the 2023 season, Komatsu was the J3 League top goalscorer, with 19 goals in 36 games. He was also part of the J3 League Best XI.

=== Loan to Zweigen Kanazawa ===
On 10 January 2019, Komatsu was announced at Zweigen Kanazawa. He made his league debut against Tochigi on 24 February 2019. On his first start for the club against Tokyo Verdy on 9 March 2019, Komatsu scored his first league goal in the 8th minute.

=== Loan to Renofa Yamaguchi ===
On 23 February 2020, Komatsu made his league debut against Kyoto Sanga. He scored his first league goal against Mito HollyHock on 13 September 2020, scoring in the 66th minute.

=== Blaublitz Akita ===
Komatsu was announced at Blaublitz Akita. He made his league debut against Ehime on 25 February 2024. Komatsu scored his first league goal against Montedio Yamagata on 18 May 2024, scoring in the 16th minute.

== Honours ==
Vissel Kobe

- J1 100 Year Vision League: 2026

Individual

- J3 League top scorer: 2023
- J3 League Best XI: 2023
