= Shion Niwa =

Japanese footballer

Shion Niwa 丹羽詩温
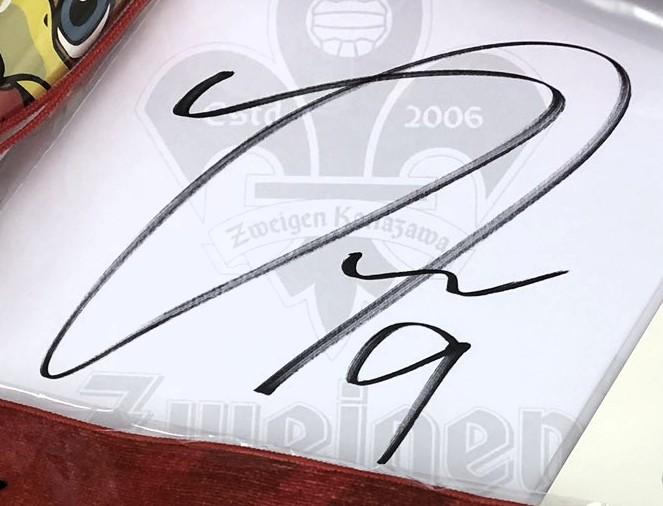
- Autograph in 2021

Personal information
- Full name: Shion Niwa
- Date of birth: 18 June 1994 (age 32)
- Place of birth: El Paso, Texas, United States
- Height: 1.78 m (5 ft 10 in)
- Position: Forward

Team information
- Current team: Kamatamare Sanuki
- Number: 30

Youth career
- –2006: Nishi Okanmuri FC
- 2007–2009: Jonan Junior High School
- 2010–2012: Osaka Toin High School

College career
Years	Team	Apps	(Gls)
2013–2016	Meiji University		

Senior career*
Years	Team	Apps	(Gls)
2017–2020	Ehime FC	138	(19)
2021–2023	Zweigen Kanazawa	63	(10)
2023	→ Blaublitz Akita (loan)	37	(2)
2024	Blaublitz Akita	7	(0)
2024	→ Kamatamare Sanuki (loan)	18	(3)
2025–	Kamatamare Sanuki	10	(2)
- * Club domestic league appearances and goals as of 1 January 2026

Shion Niwa (丹羽 詩温, Niwa Shion; born 18 June 1994), is a Japanese professional footballer who plays as a forward for J3 League club Kamatamare Sanuki.

== Career statistics ==
Updated to 15 December 2022.

Appearances and goals by club, season and competition
Club	Season	League			Emperor's Cup		Total	
Club	Season	Division	Apps	Goals	Apps	Goals	Apps	Goals
Ehime FC	2017	J2 League	34	7	2	1	36	8
Ehime FC	2018	J2 League	34	1	1	0	35	1
Ehime FC	2019	J2 League	28	5	1	0	29	5
Ehime FC	2020	J2 League	42	6	—		42	6
Zweigen Kanazawa	2021	J2 League	40	9	0	0	40	9
Zweigen Kanazawa	2022	J2 League	23	1	2	0	25	1
Blaublitz Akita	2023	J2 League	0	0	0	0	0	0
Career total			201	29	6	1	207	30
