= Kosuke Inose =

Japanese footballer

Kosuke Inose 猪瀬 康介
Personal information
- Date of birth: 25 December 2000 (age 25)
- Place of birth: Ibaraki, Japan
- Height: 1.85 m (6 ft 1 in)
- Position: Goalkeeper

Team information
- Current team: Kochi United
- Number: 17

Youth career
- –2015: Kashima Antlers
- 2016–2018: RKU Kashiwa High School

Senior career*
Years	Team	Apps	(Gls)
2019–2022	Ryukyu	14	(0)
2023–2026	Sagamihara	2	(0)
2024	→ Blaublitz Akita (loan)	0	(0)
2026–	Kochi United	16	(0)
- * Club domestic league appearances and goals as of 21 August 2026

Kosuke Inose (猪瀬 康介, Inose Kosuke; born 25 December 2000) is a Japanese footballer currently playing as a goalkeeper and currently for J3 League club, Kochi United.

== Career ==
On 20 December 2022, Inose officially transfer to SC Sagamihara from 2023.

== Career statistics ==
=== Club ===
As of the start for 2025 season.

Club	Season	League			Cup		Other		Total	
Club	Season	Division	Apps	Goals	Apps	Goals	Apps	Goals	Apps	Goals
FC Ryukyu	2019	J2 League	1	0	0	0	0	0	1	0
FC Ryukyu	2020	J2 League	0	0	0	0	0	0	0	0
FC Ryukyu	2021	J2 League	13	0	1	0	0	0	14	0
FC Ryukyu	2022	J2 League	0	0	0	0	0	0	0	0
SC Sagamihara	2023	J3 League	1	0	0	0	0	0	1	0
Blaublitz Akita (loan)	2024	J2 League	0	0	0	0	0	0	0	0
SC Sagamihara	2025	J3 League	0	0	0	0	0	0	0	0
Career total			15	0	1	0	0	0	16	0
