= Keita Yoshioka =

Japanese footballer

Personal information
- Full name: Keita Yoshioka
- Date of birth: 5 October 1997 (age 29)
- Place of birth: Tokyo, Japan
- Height: 1.82 m (6 ft 0 in)
- Position: Defender

Team information
- Current team: Renofa Yamaguchi
- Number: 5

Youth career
- Karasuyama Kita FC
- FC Tucano
- –2015: Funabashi Municipal HS
- 2016–2019: Niigata University of Health and Welfare

Senior career*
Years	Team	Apps	(Gls)
2020–2022	Nagano Parceiro	58	(3)
2022–2024	Montedio Yamagata	8	(0)
2024	→ Blaublitz Akita (loan)	21	(2)
2025–	Renofa Yamaguchi	40	(3)
- * Club domestic league appearances and goals as of 21 August 2026

Keita Yoshioka (喜岡 佳太, Yoshioka Keita; born 5 October 1997) is a Japanese footballer currently playing as a defender for Renofa Yamaguchi.

== Career statistics ==
=== Club ===
As of 28 July 2022.

Club	Season	League			National Cup		League Cup		Other		Total	
Club	Season	Division	Apps	Goals	Apps	Goals	Apps	Goals	Apps	Goals	Apps	Goals
Nagano Parceiro	2020	J3 League	16	0	0	0	–		0	0	19	0
Nagano Parceiro	2021	J3 League	25	2	1	0	–		0	0	26	2
Nagano Parceiro	2022	J3 League	17	1	0	0	–		0	0	17	1
Montedio Yamagata	2022	J2 League	0	0	0	0	–		0	0	0	0
Career total			58	3	1	0	0	0	0	0	59	3
