= Daiki Sato =

Japanese footballer

Personal information
- Date of birth: 23 April 1999 (age 27)
- Place of birth: Ebetsu, Hokkaido, Japan
- Height: 1.78 m (5 ft 10 in)
- Position: Forward

Team information
- Current team: Júbilo Iwata
- Number: 47

Youth career
- Club Fields
- –2017: Hokkaido Consadole Sapporo

College career
Years	Team	Apps	(Gls)
2018–2021	Hosei University		

Senior career*
Years	Team	Apps	(Gls)
2021–2024	Machida Zelvia	9	(0)
2023	→ YSCC Yokohama (loan)	26	(7)
2024	→ Blaublitz Akita (loan)	36	(6)
2025–2026	Blaublitz Akita	48	(10)
2026–	Júbilo Iwata	1	(0)
- * Club domestic league appearances and goals as of 14 August 2026

Daiki Sato (佐藤 大樹, Sato Daiki; born 23 April 1999) is a Japanese footballer currently playing as a forward for Júbilo Iwata.

== Career statistics ==
=== Club ===
As of 13 June 2021.

Club	Season	League			National Cup		League Cup		Other		Total	
Club	Season	Division	Apps	Goals	Apps	Goals	Apps	Goals	Apps	Goals	Apps	Goals
Hosei University	2019	–			3 (Note: Appearances in the Emperor's Cup)	0	–		0	0	3	0
Machida Zelvia	2021	J2 League	1	0	0	0	0	0	0	0	1	0
Career total			1	0	3	0	0	0	0	0	4	0
