= Sota Watanabe =

Japanese footballer

Sota Watanabe 渡邊 創太
Personal information
- Full name: Sota Watanabe
- Date of birth: 25 August 2000 (age 26)
- Place of birth: Ehime, Japan
- Height: 1.79 m (5 ft 10 in)
- Position: Midfielder

Team information
- Current team: Renofa Yamaguchi FC
- Number: 13

Youth career
- 2016–2018: Ehime FC

Senior career*
| Years | Team | Apps | (Gls) |
| 2018–2021 | Ehime FC | 51 | (1) |
| 2022 | MIO Biwako Shiga | 1 | (0) |
| 2023 | Asuka FC | | |
| 2024–2026 | Giravanz Kitakyushu | 66 | (10) |
| 2026– | Renofa Yamaguchi FC | 2 | (0) |
- * Club domestic league appearances and goals as of 21 August 2026

Sota Watanabe (渡邊 創太, Watanabe Sōta; born 25 August 2000) is a Japanese footballer who plays for Renofa Yamaguchi FC.

== Playing career ==
Watanabe was born in Ehime Prefecture on 25 August 2000. He joined J2 League club Ehime FC from youth team in 2018. On 6 June, he debuted against Mito Hollyhock in Emperor's Cup.
