= 1984 Japanese Regional Leagues =

Japanese amateur leagues football season

Japanese Regional Leagues
- Season: 1984

Statistics of Japanese Regional Leagues for the 1984 season.

== Champions list ==
Region	Champions
Hokkaido	Sapporo Mazda
Tohoku	TDK
Kantō	Toho Titanium
Hokushin'etsu	YKK
Tōkai	Seino Transportation
Kansai	Kyoto Police
Chūgoku	Kawasaki Steel Mizushima
Shikoku	Teijin
Kyushu	Mitsubishi Chemical Kurosaki

== League standings ==
=== Hokkaido ===
Pos	Team	Pld	W	D	L	GF	GA	GD	Pts	Qualification
1	Sapporo Mazda	9	7	0	2	23	9	+14	14	Qualified for the 8th JSL Promotion Tournament
2	Nippon Steel Muroran	9	6	2	1	18	11	+7	14	
3	Sapporo University OB	9	5	2	2	23	21	+2	12	
4	Sapporo	9	3	3	3	20	14	+6	9	
5	Hakodate Mazda	9	2	5	2	13	12	+1	9	
6	Hokushukai	9	4	1	4	13	15	−2	9	
7	Otaru Shuyukai	9	4	0	5	15	16	−1	8	
8	Muroran Teachers	9	3	2	4	12	24	−12	8	
9	Blackpecker Hakodate	9	3	1	5	17	15	+2	7	
10	Nippon Oil Muroran	9	0	0	9	8	25	−17	0	

Source: RSSSF

=== Tohoku ===
Pos	Team	Pld	W	D	L	GF	GA	GD	Pts
1	TDK	14	11	1	2	50	15	+35	23
2	Akita City Government	14	8	3	3	41	17	+24	19
3	Morioka Zebra	14	8	2	4	39	23	+16	18
4	Matsushima	14	8	2	4	38	22	+16	18
5	Nitto Boseki Fukushima	14	5	3	6	34	31	+3	13
6	Akisho Club	14	4	1	9	17	34	−17	9
7	Akita Toyota	14	3	1	10	16	67	−51	7
8	Kureha	14	2	1	11	15	41	−26	5

Source: RSSSF

=== Kantō ===
Pos	Team	Pld	W	D	L	GF	GA	GD	Pts
1	Toho Titanium	18	13	2	3	43	12	+31	28
2	Furukawa Chiba	18	12	4	2	35	11	+24	28
3	NTT Kanto	18	10	2	6	36	17	+19	22
4	Ibaraki Hitachi	18	7	7	4	16	14	+2	21
5	Saitama Teachers	18	8	4	6	28	15	+13	20
6	Ibaraki Teachers	18	8	3	7	24	23	+1	19
7	Hitachi Mito Katsuta	18	5	6	7	16	28	−12	16
8	Chiba Teachers	18	5	4	9	20	31	−11	14
9	Tokyo Sanyo	18	2	5	11	11	35	−24	9
10	Mitsubishi Yowa	18	0	3	15	10	53	−43	3

Source: RSSSF

=== Hokushin'etsu ===
Pos	Team	Pld	W	D	L	GF	GA	GD	Pts
1	YKK	9	8	1	0	21	7	+14	17
2	Nissei Plastic Industrial	9	7	0	2	43	11	+32	14
3	Fukui Teachers	9	5	1	3	18	12	+6	11
4	Toyama Club	9	3	4	2	18	18	0	10
5	Fukui Bank	9	3	3	3	20	18	+2	9
6	Seiyū Club	9	4	0	5	15	16	−1	8
7	Yamaga	9	2	3	4	13	15	−2	7
8	Fujitsu Nagano	9	3	1	5	17	23	−6	7
9	Kanazawa	9	2	2	5	15	21	−6	6
10	Teihens	9	0	1	8	6	45	−39	1

Source: RSSSF

=== Tokai ===
Pos	Team	Pld	W	D	L	GF	GA	GD	Pts
1	Seino Transportation	13	13	0	0	42	10	+32	26
2	Cosmo Daikyo Oil	13	11	0	2	46	10	+36	22
3	Fujieda City Government	13	8	0	5	28	21	+7	16
4	Mitsui Du Pont Fluorochemicals	13	4	2	7	19	32	−13	10
5	Maruyasu	13	4	1	8	17	36	−19	9
6	Honda Hamayukai	13	6	1	6	26	28	−2	13
7	Yamaha Club	13	4	3	6	16	23	−7	11
8	Toyoda Machine Works	13	4	2	7	24	24	0	10
9	Nagoya	13	4	1	8	17	25	−8	9
10	Tomoegawa Papers	13	2	0	11	16	42	−26	4

Source: RSSSF

=== Kansai ===
Pos	Team	Pld	W	D	L	GF	GA	GD	Pts
1	Kyoto Police	16	8	5	3	28	19	+9	21
2	Osaka Gas	16	9	3	4	32	24	+8	21
3	Dainichi Nippon Cable	16	7	6	3	23	16	+7	20
4	Hyogo Teachers	16	7	5	4	24	20	+4	19
5	Tanabe	16	3	10	3	11	12	−1	16
6	Kyoto Shiko Club	16	5	5	6	20	20	0	15
7	NTT Kinki	16	5	5	6	18	21	−3	15
8	Osaka Teachers	16	4	3	9	18	24	−6	11
9	Mitsubishi Motors Kyoto	16	2	2	12	16	34	−18	6

Source: RSSSF

=== Chūgoku ===
Pos	Team	Pld	W	D	L	GF	GA	GD	Pts
1	Kawasaki Steel Mizushima	14	11	2	1	43	9	+34	24
2	Mazda Auto Hiroshima	14	9	3	2	40	14	+26	21
3	Mitsubishi Oil	14	8	5	1	35	18	+17	21
4	Yamaguchi Teachers	14	8	1	5	38	27	+11	17
5	Tanabe Pharmaceuticals	14	5	1	8	18	32	−14	11
6	Mitsui Shipbuilding	14	4	1	9	20	35	−15	9
7	Mazda Toyo	14	3	1	10	12	34	−22	7
8	Masuda Club	14	0	2	12	13	50	−37	2

Source: RSSSF

=== Shikoku ===
Pos	Team	Pld	W	D	L	GF	GA	GD	Pts
1	Teijin	14	14	0	0	70	7	+63	28
2	Takasho OB Club	14	6	5	3	33	30	+3	17
3	Nangoku Club	14	7	1	6	34	30	+4	15
4	Imabari Club	14	6	2	6	37	33	+4	14
5	Aiyu Club	14	5	3	6	30	30	0	13
6	Daio Paper	14	5	1	8	29	54	−25	11
7	Showa Club	14	3	2	9	17	43	−26	8
8	Otsuka Pharmaceuticals	14	1	4	9	21	44	−23	6

Source: RSSSF

=== Kyushu ===
Pos	Team	Pld	W	D	L	GF	GA	GD	Pts
1	Mitsubishi Chemical Kurosaki	9	7	1	1	30	12	+18	15
2	Nippon Steel Oita	9	6	2	1	23	15	+8	14
3	Kagoshima Teachers	9	5	3	1	24	16	+8	13
4	Saga Nanyo Club	9	4	2	3	23	17	+6	10
5	Mitsubishi Heavy Industries Nagasaki	9	4	2	3	13	10	+3	10
6	Kumamoto Teachers	9	3	3	3	17	14	+3	9
7	Nakatsu Club	9	2	3	4	15	19	−4	7
8	NTT Kumamoto	9	2	2	5	10	17	−7	6
9	Fukuoka Teachers	9	1	3	5	15	21	−6	5
10	Kawasoe Club	9	0	1	8	10	39	−29	1

Source: RSSSF
