= Shota Aoki =

Japanese footballer

Shota Aoki 青木 翔大
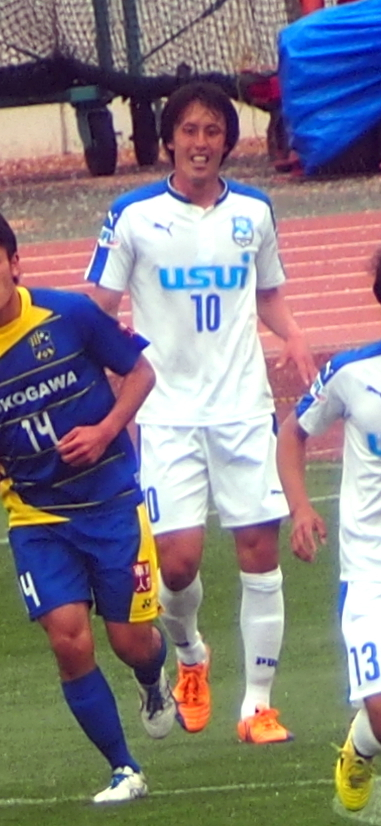
- Shota playing

Personal information
- Full name: Shota Aoki
- Date of birth: August 11, 1990 (age 36)
- Place of birth: Atsugi, Kanagawa, Japan
- Height: 1.82 m (5 ft 11 1/2 in)
- Position: Forward

Team information
- Current team: Thespa Gunma
- Number: 9

Youth career
- 1997–2002: Moridai FC
- 2003–2005: Footwork Club
- 2006–2008: Kashima Gakuen High School

College career
Years	Team	Apps	(Gls)
2009–2012	Toin University of Yokohama		

Senior career*
Years	Team	Apps	(Gls)
2013–2015	Yokohama FC	4	(0)
2013	→ Nagano Parceiro (loan)	12	(0)
2014	→ FC Ryukyu (loan)	32	(7)
2016–2018	Azul Claro Numazu	87	(19)
2019–2021	Thespakusatsu Gunma	87	(15)
2022–2024	Blaublitz Akita	95	(11)
2025–	Thespa Gunma	26	(6)
- * Club domestic league appearances and goals as of 1 January 2026

Shota Aoki (青木 翔大, Aoki Shōta; born August 11, 1990) is a Japanese football player for Thespa Gunma.

== Career ==
=== Yokohama FC ===
Aoki made his debut for Yokohama against Thespakusatsu Gunma on 20 March 2013.

=== Azul Claro Numazu ===
Aoki played for Azul against FC Tokyo U-23 on 11 March 2018. He scored for the club on 17 March 2018 against Iwate Grulla Morioka, scoring in the 43rd minute.

=== Thespa Gunma ===
Aoki scored a brace on his debut for Thespa against Blaublitz Akita on 10 March 2019, scoring in the 40th and 53rd minute.

=== Blaublitz Akita ===
Aoki made his debut for Blaublitz against Tochigi SC on 19 February 2022. He scored his first league goal against Iwate Grulla Morioka on the 3 April 2022, scoring in the 48th minute.

== Club statistics ==
Updated to 7 December 2022.

Club performance			League		Cup		Total	
Season	Club	League	Apps	Goals	Apps	Goals	Apps	Goals
Japan			League		Emperor's Cup		Total	
2013	Yokohama FC	J2 League	3	0	–		3	0
2013	Nagano Parceiro	JFL	12	0	4	1	16	1
2014	FC Ryukyu	J3 League	32	7	2	0	34	7
2015	Yokohama FC	J2 League	1	0	0	0	1	0
2016	Azul Claro Numazu	JFL	30	6	–		30	6
2017	Azul Claro Numazu	J3 League	27	6	1	0	28	6
2018	Azul Claro Numazu	J3 League	30	7	–		30	7
2019	Thespakusatsu Gunma	J3 League	24	10	2	0	26	10
2020	Thespakusatsu Gunma	J2 League	33	2	–		33	2
2021	Thespakusatsu Gunma	J2 League	30	3	2	0	32	3
2022	Blaublitz Akita	J2 League	27	5	0	0	27	5
2023	Blaublitz Akita	J2 League	0	0	0	0	0	0
Total			249	46	11	1	260	47

== Honours ==
Thespakusatsu Gunma

- J3 League 2019 (runners-up)
