= Ryohei Okazaki =

Japanese footballer

Ryohei Okazaki 岡﨑 亮平
Personal information
- Full name: Ryohei Okazaki
- Date of birth: 25 April 1992 (age 34)
- Place of birth: Atsugi, Kanagawa, Japan
- Height: 1.85 m (6 ft 1 in)
- Position: Defender

Team information
- Current team: Blaublitz Akita
- Number: 2

Youth career
- 1999–2004: Ogino SC
- 2005–2010: Shonan Bellmare

College career
Years	Team	Apps	(Gls)
2011–2014	Chuo University		

Senior career*
Years	Team	Apps	(Gls)
2015–2018	Shonan Bellmare	5	(0)
2015	→ Roasso Kumamoto (loan)	1	(0)
2019–2022	FC Ryukyu	96	(0)
2023	Tochigi SC	24	(0)
2024-	Blaublitz Akita	34	(2)
- * Club domestic league appearances and goals as of 14 August 2026

Ryohei Okazaki (岡﨑 亮平, Okazaki Ryohei; born 25 April 1992) is a Japanese footballer who plays for Blaublitz Akita.

== Club statistics ==
Updated to 23 February 2018.

Appearances and goals by club, season and competition
Club	Season	League			Emperor's Cup		J. League Cup		Total	
Club	Season	Division	Apps	Goals	Apps	Goals	Apps	Goals	Apps	Goals
Shonan Bellmare	2015	J1 League	0	0	–		3	0	3	0
Shonan Bellmare	2016	J1 League	1	0	0	0	1	0	2	0
Shonan Bellmare	2017	J2 League	4	0	0	0	–		4	0
Shonan Bellmare	Total		5	0	0	0	4	0	9	0
Roasso Kumamoto (loan)	2015	J2 League	1	0	0	0	–		1	0
Career total			6	0	0	0	4	0	10	0
