= Kazuma Nagai =

Japanese footballer

Kazuma Nagai 長井 一真
Personal information
- Date of birth: 2 November 1998 (age 28)
- Place of birth: Toyonaka, Osaka, Japan
- Height: 1.80 m (5 ft 11 in)
- Position: Defender

Team information
- Current team: Blaublitz Akita
- Number: 5

Youth career
- –2013: Osaka Central FC
- 2014–2016: Kokoku High School

College career
Years	Team	Apps	(Gls)
2017–2020	Kansai University		

Senior career*
Years	Team	Apps	(Gls)
2020–2023	Kyoto Sanga	25	(0)
2023–2025	Mito HollyHock	48	(4)
2025	→ Blaublitz Akita (loan)	27	(1)
2026–	Blaublitz Akita	19	(1)
- * Club domestic league appearances and goals as of 14 August 2026

Kazuma Nagai (長井 一真, Nagai Kazuma; born 2 November 1998) is a Japanese professional footballer who plays as a defender for J2 League club Blaublitz Akita.

== Career statistics ==
=== Club ===
As of 13 May 2026.

Appearances and goals by club, season and competition
Club	Season	League			National cup (Note: Includes Emperor Cup)		League cup (Note: Includes J.League Cup)		Total	
Club	Season	Division	Apps	Goals	Apps	Goals	Apps	Goals	Apps	Goals
Kyoto Sanga	2020	J2 League	3	0	0	0	0	0	3	0
Kyoto Sanga	2021	J2 League	12	0	3	0	0	0	15	0
Kyoto Sanga	2022	J1 League	10	0	2	0	5	0	17	0
Kyoto Sanga	Total		25	0	5	0	5	0	35	0
Mito HollyHock	2023	J2 League	21	1	1	0	–		22	1
Mito HollyHock	2024	J2 League	27	3	1	0	–		28	3
Mito HollyHock	Total		48	4	2	0	0	0	50	4
Blaublitz Akita (loan)	2025	J2 League	27	1	2	0	2	0	31	1
Blaublitz Akita	2026	J2/J3 (100)	15	0	0	0	0	0	15	0
Career total			115	5	9	0	7	0	131	5
