= Ryuji Saito =

Japanese footballer

Ryuji Saito 才藤 龍治
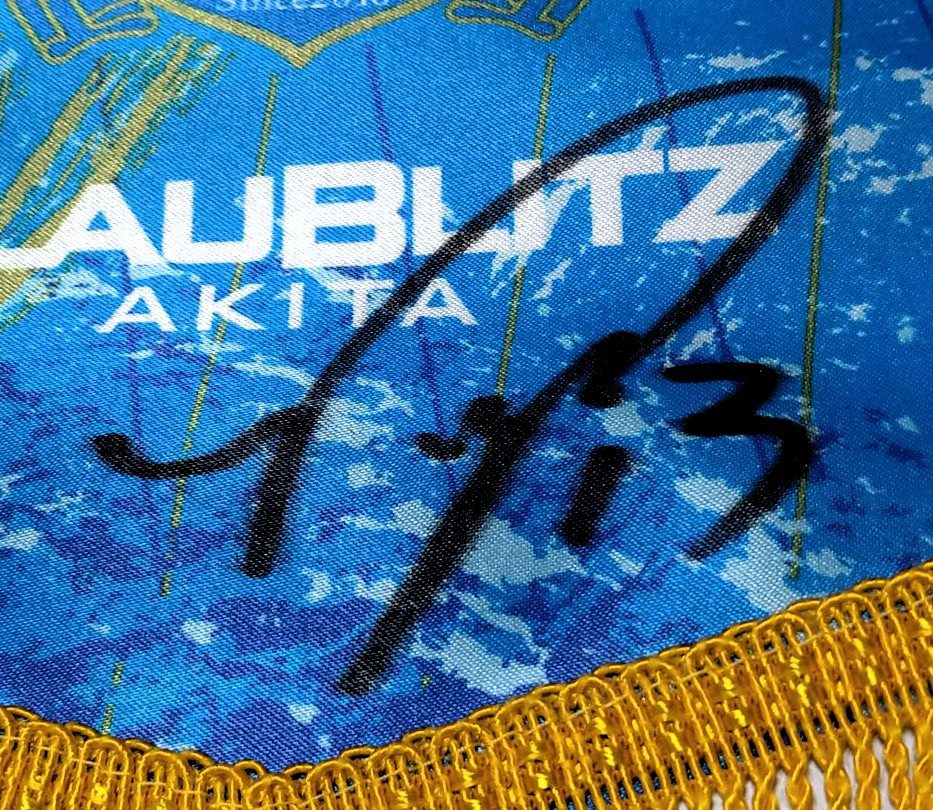

Personal information
- Full name: Ryuji Saito
- Date of birth: March 12, 1993 (age 33)
- Place of birth: Shibuya-ku, Tokyo, Japan
- Height: 1.76 m (5 ft 9 1/2 in)
- Position: Defender

Team information
- Current team: Blaublitz Akita
- Number: 13

Youth career
- Shibuya Tobu JFC
- Shibuya Central
- –2007: FC Toripletta
- 2008–2010: Seiritsu Gakuen High School

College career
Years	Team	Apps	(Gls)
2011–2014	Tokyo International University		

Senior career*
Years	Team	Apps	(Gls)
2015–2017	FC Ryukyu	80	(8)
2018–2019	Kataller Toyama	46	(10)
2020	SC Sagamihara	34	(7)
2021–	Blaublitz Akita	144	(11)
- * Club domestic league appearances and goals as of 14 August 2026

Ryuji Saito (才藤 龍治, Saitō Ryūji; born March 12, 1993, in Tokyo) is a Japanese footballer who plays as a defender for J2 League club Blaublitz Akita.

== Club statistics ==
Updated to 3 December 2022.

Appearances and goals by club, season and competition
Club	Season	League			Emperor's Cup		Total	
Club	Season	Division	Apps	Goals	Apps	Goals	Apps	Goals
TIU	2013	-	–		1	0	1	0
FC Ryukyu	2015	J3 League	27	3	1	0	28	3
FC Ryukyu	2016	J3 League	22	4	0	0	22	4
FC Ryukyu	2017	J3 League	31	1	1	0	32	1
Kataller Toyama	2018	J3 League	27	6	2	0	29	6
Kataller Toyama	2019	J3 League	19	4	3	0	22	4
SC Sagamihara	2020	J3 League	34	7	0	0	34	7
Blaublitz Akita	2021	J2 League	27	0	1	0	28	0
Blaublitz Akita	2022	J2 League	27	1	1	0	28	1
Blaublitz Akita	2023	J2 League	0	0	0	0	0	0
Career total			214	26	10	0	224	26
