= Soki Yatagai =

Japanese footballer

Personal information
- Date of birth: 11 June 1998 (age 28)
- Place of birth: Osaka, Japan
- Height: 1.84 m (6 ft 0 in)
- Position: Goalkeeper

Team information
- Current team: Blaublitz Akita
- Number: 23

Youth career
- –2013: FC Hirano
- 2014–2016: Kyoto Tachibana High School

College career
Years	Team	Apps	(Gls)
2017–2020	Osaka University H&SS		

Senior career*
Years	Team	Apps	(Gls)
2021–2023	Nagano Parceiro	18	(0)
2024–	Blaublitz Akita	1	(0)
- * Club domestic league appearances and goals as of 14 August 2026

Soki Yatagai (矢田貝 壮貴, Yatagai Soki; born 11 June 1998) is a Japanese footballer currently playing as a goalkeeper for Blaublitz Akita.

== Early life ==
Soki was born in Osaka.

== Career ==
Soki made his debut for Nagano against Kamatamare Sanuki on the 14th March 2021.

== Career statistics ==
=== Club ===
As of 14 March 2021.

Club	Season	League			National Cup		League Cup		Other		Total	
Club	Season	Division	Apps	Goals	Apps	Goals	Apps	Goals	Apps	Goals	Apps	Goals
Nagano Parceiro	2021	J3 League	1	0	0	0	–		0	0	1	0
Career total			1	0	0	0	0	0	0	0	1	0
