= 1993 Japanese Regional Leagues =

Japanese amateur leagues football season

Japanese Regional Leagues
- Season: 1993

Statistics of Japanese Regional Leagues for the 1993 season.

== Champions list ==
Region	Champions
Hokkaido	Hokuden
Tohoku	NEC Yamagata
Kantō	Honda Luminozo Sayama
Hokushin'etsu	YKK
Tōkai	Denso
Kansai	Tanabe Pharmaceuticals
Chūgoku	Mazda Toyo
Shikoku	Teijin
Kyushu	TOA Construction

== League standings ==
=== Hokkaido ===
Division 1
Pos	Team	Pld	W	D	L	GF	GA	GD	Pts
1	Hokuden	14	12	1	1	66	18	+48	37
2	Ẽfini Sapporo	14	10	1	3	55	26	+29	31
3	Sapporo	14	8	4	2	41	23	+18	28
4	Nippon Steel Muroran	14	4	6	4	26	29	−3	18
5	JSW Muroran	14	5	2	7	28	34	−6	17
6	Blackpecker Hakodate	14	3	2	9	21	38	−17	11
7	Asahikawa Daisetsu Club	14	3	0	11	22	47	−25	9
8	Hakodate Mazda	14	2	2	10	17	61	−44	8

Source: RSSSF

Division 2
Pos	Team	Pld	W	D	L	GF	GA	GD	Pts
1	Sapporo Daiichi Club	7	6	1	0	17	3	+14	19
2	Sapporo University OB	7	4	1	2	16	9	+7	13
3	Nippon Oil Muroran	7	4	0	3	11	6	+5	12
4	Muroran	7	2	3	2	6	7	−1	9
5	Kyokushukai	7	3	0	4	9	14	−5	9
6	Otaru Shuyukai	7	2	3	2	9	18	−9	9
7	Nippon Paper Yufutsu	7	1	3	3	7	11	−4	6
8	Asahikawa	7	0	1	6	4	11	−7	1

Source: RSSSF

=== Tohoku ===
Pos	Team	Pld	W	D	L	GF	GA	GD	Pts
1	NEC Yamagata	14	13	1	0	66	4	+62	27
2	Tohoku Electric Power	14	11	2	1	45	11	+34	24
3	Matsushima	14	5	3	6	15	22	−7	13
4	Fukushima	14	4	3	7	20	32	−12	11
5	TDK	14	4	3	7	22	30	−8	11
6	Akita City Government	14	4	3	7	21	25	−4	11
7	Morioka Zebra	14	2	4	8	7	37	−30	8
8	Nakata Club	14	3	1	10	8	43	−35	7

Source: RSSSF
Rules for classification: 2 points for a win

=== Kantō ===
Pos	Team	Pld	W	D	L	GF	GA	GD	Pts
1	Honda Luminozo Sayama	18	14	2	2	64	22	+42	30
2	Chiba Teachers	18	12	5	1	52	22	+30	29
3	Yokogawa Electric	18	9	3	6	32	29	+3	21
4	Furukawa Chiba	18	9	2	7	31	39	−8	20
5	Saitama Teachers	18	8	3	7	45	27	+18	19
6	Ibaraki Hitachi	18	8	3	7	28	29	−1	19
7	Kanagawa Teachers	18	6	2	10	23	31	−8	14
8	Sanyo Electric Tokyo	18	3	6	9	14	31	−17	12
9	Tonan	18	3	3	12	16	53	−37	9
10	Asahi	18	2	3	13	22	44	−22	7

Source: RSSSF
Rules for classification: 2 points for a win

=== Hokushin'etsu ===
Pos	Team	Pld	W	D	L	GF	GA	GD	Pts
1	YKK	9	8	0	1	39	6	+33	16
2	Hokuriku Electric Power	9	6	3	0	28	12	+16	15
3	Kanazawa	9	3	3	3	22	19	+3	9
4	Niigata eleven	9	4	1	4	13	13	0	9
5	Teihens	9	3	3	3	20	21	−1	9
6	Yamaga	9	3	3	3	15	17	−2	9
7	Toyama Club	9	3	2	4	13	24	−11	8
8	Seiyū Club	9	2	3	4	17	17	0	7
9	Nissei Plastic Industrial	9	2	2	5	10	23	−13	6
10	Fukui Teachers	9	0	2	7	8	33	−25	2

Source: RSSSF
Rules for classification: 2 points for a win

=== Tōkai ===
Pos	Team	Pld	W	D	L	GF	GA	GD	Pts
1	Denso	16	14	1	1	61	7	+54	29
2	Jatco	16	14	1	1	60	11	+49	29
3	Kawasaki Heavy Industries Gifu	16	6	5	5	21	35	−14	17
4	Toyota	16	7	2	7	30	26	+4	16
5	Fujitsu Numazu	16	7	2	7	31	32	−1	16
6	Nagoya	16	5	3	8	17	41	−24	13
7	Fujieda City Government	16	6	4	6	25	20	+5	16
8	Maruyasu	16	5	4	7	21	30	−9	14
9	Minolta Camera	16	4	5	7	31	30	+1	13
10	Toyoda Automatic Loom Works	16	5	2	9	14	28	−14	12
11	Toyoda Machine Works	16	4	3	9	19	40	−21	11
12	Yamaha Club	16	2	2	12	22	52	−30	6

Source: RSSSF
Rules for classification: 2 points for a win

=== Kansai ===
Pos	Team	Pld	W	D	L	GF	GA	GD	Pts
1	Tanabe Pharmaceuticals	18	11	4	3	48	23	+25	37
2	Osaka Gas	18	10	3	5	36	24	+12	33
3	Sanyo Electric Sumoto	18	9	5	4	39	21	+18	32
4	Osaka University of Health and Sport sciences Club	18	8	4	6	29	24	+5	28
5	NTT Kansai	18	6	5	7	23	31	−8	23
6	Mitsubishi Motors Kyoto	18	7	1	10	23	31	−8	22
7	Kyoto Police	18	5	6	7	19	21	−2	21
8	Central Kobe	18	5	6	7	27	33	−6	21
9	Ain Food	18	6	3	9	27	45	−18	21
10	Kyoto Shiko Club	18	3	3	12	18	36	−18	12

Source: RSSSF

=== Chūgoku ===
Pos	Team	Pld	W	D	L	GF	GA	GD	Pts
1	Mazda Toyo	14	10	3	1	58	9	+49	33
2	Mitsubishi Motors Mizushima	14	8	2	4	37	16	+21	26
3	Yamaguchi Teachers	14	6	4	4	23	18	+5	22
4	Hiroshima Fujita	14	6	1	7	25	31	−6	19
5	Ẽfini Hiroshima	14	5	2	7	24	37	−13	17
6	NTN Okayama	14	4	4	6	17	25	−8	16
7	Tottori	14	3	3	8	22	44	−22	12
8	Masuda Club	14	3	3	8	15	41	−26	12

Source: RSSSF

=== Shikoku ===
Pos	Team	Pld	W	D	L	GF	GA	GD	Pts
1	Teijin	14	12	1	1	51	11	+40	25
2	Kagawa Shiun	14	11	0	3	53	18	+35	22
3	NTT Shikoku	14	8	1	5	40	22	+18	17
4	Alex	14	7	2	5	35	31	+4	16
5	Matsuyama Club	14	5	0	9	25	38	−13	10
6	Nangoku Club	14	4	1	9	25	42	−17	9
7	Kuroshio Club	14	3	2	9	20	46	−26	8
8	Awa Club	14	2	1	11	17	58	−41	5

Source: RSSSF
Rules for classification: 2 points for a win

=== Kyushu ===
Pos	Team	Pld	W	D	L	GF	GA	GD	Pts
1	TOA Construction	18	13	2	3	62	28	+34	41
2	Nippon Steel Yawata	18	12	4	2	53	20	+33	40
3	NTT Kyushu	18	12	4	2	43	14	+29	40
4	Mitsubishi Chemical Kurosaki	18	9	5	4	47	32	+15	32
5	Kawasoe Club	18	7	2	9	31	43	−12	23
6	Nippon Steel Oita	18	6	4	8	28	31	−3	22
7	Kumamoto Teachers	18	4	5	9	35	46	−11	17
8	Kyocera Sendai	18	5	1	12	32	54	−22	16
9	Kagoshima Teachers	18	4	1	13	24	56	−32	13
10	Mitsubishi Heavy Industries Nagasaki	18	4	0	14	23	54	−31	12

Source: RSSSF
