= Haruno, Kōchi =

Town in Kōchi Prefecture, Japan

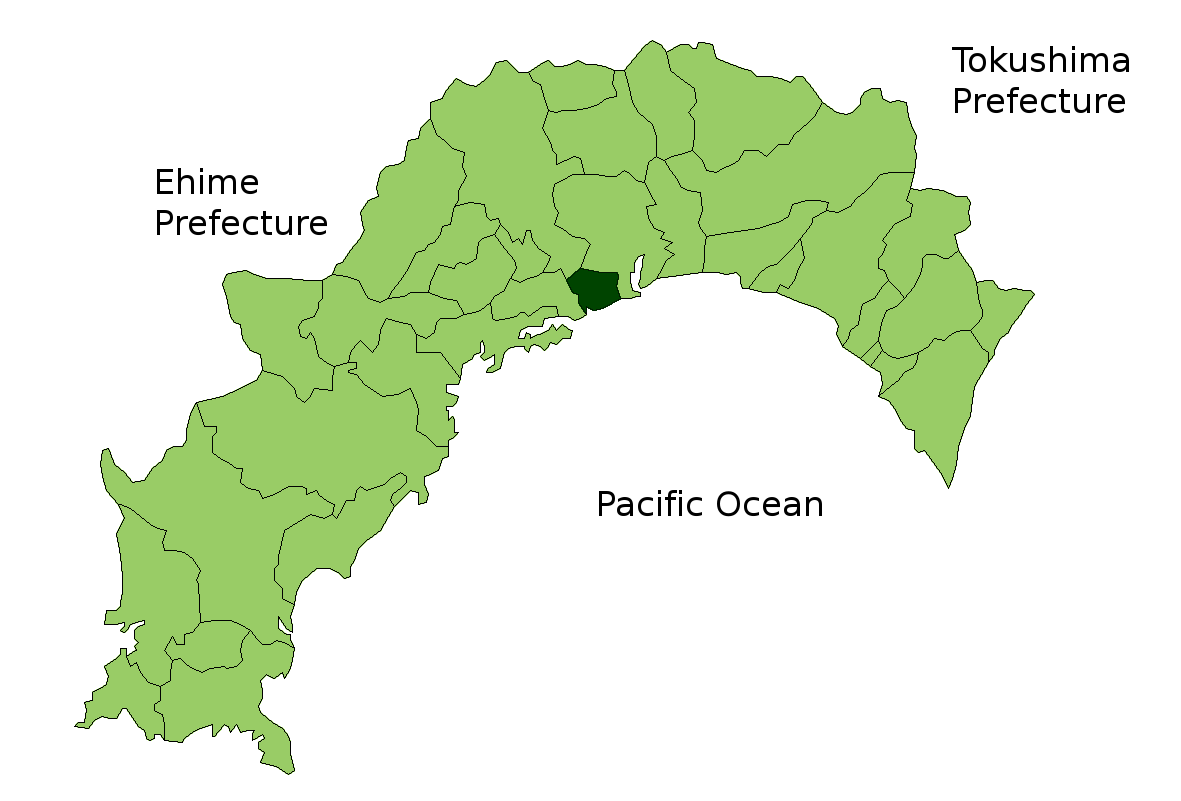
Location of Haruno in Kōchi Prefecture

Haruno (春野町, Haruno-chō) was a town located in Agawa District, Kōchi Prefecture, Japan.

As of 2003, the town had an estimated population of 15,645 and a population density of 348.13 persons per km^{2}. The total area was 44.94 km^{2}.

On January 1, 2008, Haruno was merged into the expanded city of Kōchi.

Haruno Stadium, the prefecture's largest athletics and football stadium, is located here.
