= Ryutaro Iio =

Japanese footballer (born 1991)

Ryutaro Iio 飯尾 竜太朗
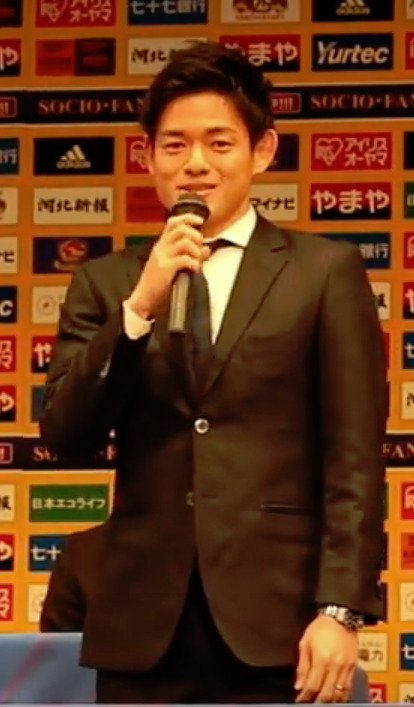

Personal information
- Full name: Ryutaro Iio
- Date of birth: 30 January 1991 (age 35)
- Place of birth: Hyōgo, Japan
- Height: 1.74 m (5 ft 9 in)
- Position: Defender

Youth career
- Kobe FC
- –2008: Vissel Kobe

College career
Years	Team	Apps	(Gls)
2009–2012	Hannan University		

Senior career*
Years	Team	Apps	(Gls)
2013–2016	Matsumoto Yamaga	46	(2)
2017–2018	V-Varen Nagasaki	71	(4)
2019–2020	Vegalta Sendai	18	(1)
2021–2023	Blaublitz Akita	84	(9)
2024–2025	V-Varen Nagasaki	8	(0)
Total		227	(16)
- * Club domestic league appearances and goals

Ryutaro Iio (飯尾 竜太朗, Iio Ryūtarō; born 30 January 1991) is a Japanese former footballer who played as a defender.

== Career ==
Iio made his league debut for Matsumoto against JEF United on 19 May 2013. He scored his first league goal for the club against Montedio Yamagata on 19 June 2016, scoring in the 90th minute.

Iio made his league debut for V-Varen against Thespa Gunma on 26 February 2017. He scored his first league goal against FC Gifu on 21 May 2017. scoring in the 51st minute.

On 4 January 2019, Iio was announced at Vegalta Sendai. He made his league debut for Vegalta against Shonan Bellmare on 4 July 2020. Iio scored his first league goal for the club against Vissel Kobe on 28 October 2020, scoring in the 76th minute.

Iio made his league debut for Blaublitz against Thespa Gunma on 28 February 2021. He scored his first league goal for the club against Matsumoto Yamaga on 4 April 2021, scoring in the 39th minute.

Following the departure of Shuto Inaba in 2022, Iio was made captain of Akita.

On 15 December 2023, Iio returned to V-Varen Nagasaki.

At the end of the 2025 season, Iio announced his retirement from professional football.

== Career statistics ==
Appearances and goals by club, season and competition
Club	Season	League			National cup (Note: Includes Emperor's Cup)		League cup (Note: Includes J.League Cup)		Other		Total	
Club	Season	Division	Apps	Goals	Apps	Goals	Apps	Goals	Apps	Goals	Apps	Goals
Hannan University	2011	–			1	0	–		–		1	0
Matsumoto Yamaga	2013	J.League Division 2	14	0	1	0	0	0	0	0	15	0
Matsumoto Yamaga	2014	J.League Division 2	8	0	2	0	0	0	0	0	10	0
Matsumoto Yamaga	2015	J1 League	6	0	2	0	4	0	0	0	12	0
Matsumoto Yamaga	2016	J2 League	18	2	0	0	0	0	1 (Note: Appearance in J1/J2 play-offs)	0	19	2
Matsumoto Yamaga	Total		46	2	5	0	4	0	1	0	56	2
V-Varen Nagasaki	2017	J2 League	39	3	0	0	0	0	0	0	39	3
V-Varen Nagasaki	2018	J1 League	32	1	1	0	0	0	0	0	33	1
V-Varen Nagasaki	Total		71	4	1	0	0	0	0	0	72	4
Vegalta Sendai	2019	J1 League	0	0	2	0	3	0	–		5	0
Vegalta Sendai	2020	J1 League	18	1	0	0	1	0	–		19	1
Vegalta Sendai	Total		18	1	2	0	4	0	0	0	24	1
Blaublitz Akita	2021	J2 League	39	4	1	0	–		–		40	4
Blaublitz Akita	2022	J2 League	17	1	0	0	–		–		17	1
Blaublitz Akita	2023	J2 League	28	4	1	0	–		–		29	4
Blaublitz Akita	Total		84	9	2	0	0	0	0	0	86	9
V-Varen Nagasaki	2024	J2 League	5	0	0	0	1	0	0	0	6	0
V-Varen Nagasaki	2025	J2 League	3	0	0	0	0	0	0	0	3	0
V-Varen Nagasaki	Total		8	0	0	0	1	0	0	0	9	0
Career total			227	16	11	0	9	0	1	0	248	16

== Honours ==
Matsumoto Yamaga

- J.League Div 2: 2014 (runner-up)

V-Varen Nagasaki

- J2 League: 2017 (runner-up)
