= 1989 Japanese Regional Leagues =

Japanese amateur leagues football season

Japanese Regional Leagues
- Season: 1989

Statistics of Japanese Regional Leagues for the 1989 football season.

== Champions list ==
Region	Champions
Hokkaido	Sapporo Mazda
Tohoku	TDK
Kantō	Yomiuri Juniors
Hokushin'etsu	YKK
Tōkai	Seino Transportation
Kansai	Sanyo Electric Sumoto
Chūgoku	Mazda Toyo
Shikoku	Otsuka Pharmaceutical
Kyushu	Mitsubishi Chemical Kurosaki

== League standings ==
=== Hokkaido ===
Division 1
Pos	Team	Pld	W	D	L	GF	GA	GD	Pts
1	Sapporo Mazda	9	8	0	1	37	3	+34	24
2	Sapporo University OB	9	6	2	1	25	6	+19	20
3	Nippon Steel Muroran	9	6	1	2	27	17	+10	19
4	Sapporo	9	5	1	3	25	9	+16	16
5	Hokuden	9	5	0	4	24	15	+9	15
6	Blackpecker Hakodate	9	3	2	4	10	13	−3	11
7	Asahikawa Daisetsu Club	9	3	0	6	12	29	−17	9
8	Nippon Oil Muroran	9	2	2	5	10	31	−21	8
9	Hakodate Mazda	9	1	4	4	8	22	−14	7
10	Otaru Shuyukai	9	0	0	9	3	36	−33	0

Source: RSSSF
Rules for classification: 3 points for a win

Division 2
Pos	Team	Pld	W	D	L	GF	GA	GD	Pts
1	Sanyo Kokusaku Pulp	6	6	0	0	24	2	+22	18
2	Japan Steel Works Muroran	6	4	0	2	14	8	+6	12
3	Hokushukai	6	2	0	4	10	17	−7	6
4	Red Panther	6	0	0	6	5	26	−21	0

Source: RSSSF
Rules for classification: 3 points for a win

=== Tohoku ===
Pos	Team	Pld	W	D	L	GF	GA	GD	Pts
1	TDK	14	11	2	1	49	11	+38	24
2	Akita City Government	14	11	1	2	33	14	+19	23
3	Matsushima	14	8	3	3	33	12	+21	19
4	Morioka Zebra	14	5	4	5	26	28	−2	14
5	Nitto Boseki Fukushima	14	3	4	7	14	39	−25	10
6	Nakata Club	14	2	5	7	19	25	−6	9
7	Ishinomaki City Government	14	3	2	9	9	32	−23	8
8	Kureha	14	2	1	11	18	40	−22	5

Source: RSSSF
Rules for classification: 2 points for a win

=== Kantō ===
Pos	Team	Pld	W	D	L	GF	GA	GD	Pts
1	Yomiuri Juniors	18	10	7	1	42	11	+31	27
2	Tokyo Gas	18	8	7	3	33	14	+19	23
3	Ibaraki Hitachi	18	8	6	4	33	20	+13	22
4	Tochigi Teachers	18	8	6	4	27	20	+7	22
5	Furukawa Chiba	18	7	6	5	28	29	−1	20
6	Kanagawa Teachers	18	7	5	6	33	37	−4	19
7	Chiba Teachers	18	7	4	7	27	25	+2	18
8	Saitama Teachers	18	6	6	6	23	22	+1	18
9	Kanto Motors	18	3	1	14	20	55	−35	7
10	Tokyo Teachers	18	1	2	15	12	45	−33	4

Source: RSSSF
Rules for classification: 2 points for a win

=== Hokushin'etsu ===
Pos	Team	Pld	W	D	L	GF	GA	GD	Pts
1	YKK	9	8	1	0	33	6	+27	17
2	Yamaga	9	6	1	2	17	10	+7	13
3	Nissei Plastic Industrial	9	5	2	2	15	12	+3	12
4	Fukui Teachers	9	5	1	3	17	16	+1	11
5	Seiyū Club	9	3	3	3	11	10	+1	9
6	Toyama Club	9	3	2	4	16	21	−5	8
7	Kanazawa	9	2	2	5	10	11	−1	6
8	Niigata Eleven	9	1	4	4	9	15	−6	6
9	Teihens	9	2	1	6	11	27	−16	5
10	Fujitsu Nagano	9	1	1	7	7	18	−11	3

Source: RSSSF
Rules for classification: 2 points for a win

=== Tōkai ===
Pos	Team	Pld	W	D	L	GF	GA	GD	Pts
1	Seino Transportation	17	14	2	1	49	8	+41	30
2	Chuo Bohan	17	11	4	2	40	12	+28	26
3	Fujieda City Government	17	11	2	4	38	17	+21	24
4	Yamaha Club	17	8	3	6	29	24	+5	19
5	Denso	17	7	3	7	44	31	+13	17
6	Toyoda Machine Works	17	6	4	7	21	37	−16	16
7	Jatco	18	5	8	5	28	22	+6	18
8	Fuyo Club	18	7	4	7	27	25	+2	18
9	Nagoya	18	6	5	7	26	27	−1	17
10	Maruyasu	18	5	6	7	31	35	−4	16
11	Kawasaki Heavy Industries Gifu	18	6	4	8	24	35	−11	16
12	Mitsui Du Pont Fluorochemicals	18	2	4	12	19	51	−32	8
13	Yamakiya Club	18	1	1	16	16	68	−52	3

Source: RSSSF
Rules for classification: 2 points for a win

=== Kansai ===
Pos	Team	Pld	W	D	L	GF	GA	GD	Pts
1	Sanyo Electric Sumoto	15	9	3	3	34	14	+20	21
2	NTT Kansai	15	10	1	4	33	14	+19	21
3	Kyoto Police	15	9	3	3	30	12	+18	21
4	Central Kobe	15	6	3	6	18	20	−2	15
5	Mitsubishi Motors Kyoto	15	5	5	5	19	23	−4	15
6	Tanabe Pharmaceuticals	15	4	4	7	22	29	−7	12
7	Osaka University of Commerce Ain	14	5	4	5	14	20	−6	14
8	Mitsubishi Cable Industries	14	5	3	6	21	25	−4	13
9	West Osaka	14	3	5	6	10	22	−12	11
10	Osaka Teachers	14	3	3	8	9	19	−10	9
11	Osaka Police	14	2	4	8	9	21	−12	8

Source: RSSSF
Rules for classification: 2 points for a win

=== Chūgoku ===
Pos	Team	Pld	W	D	L	GF	GA	GD	Pts
1	Mazda Toyo	12	8	4	0	23	9	+14	20
2	Yamaguchi Teachers	12	7	3	2	28	15	+13	17
3	Hiroshima Fujita	12	5	5	2	23	17	+6	15
4	Okayama Teachers	12	1	7	4	8	13	−5	9
5	Hiroshima Teachers	12	4	1	7	12	21	−9	9
6	Mitsubishi Oil	12	2	4	6	16	21	−5	8
7	Yonago	12	1	4	7	10	24	−14	6

Source: RSSSF
Rules for classification: 2 points for a win

=== Shikoku ===
Pos	Team	Pld	W	D	L	GF	GA	GD	Pts
1	Otsuka Pharmaceutical	14	13	1	0	85	8	+77	27
2	NTT Shikoku	14	10	1	3	37	15	+22	21
3	Alex	14	8	1	5	40	33	+7	17
4	Nangoku Club	14	7	2	5	36	36	0	16
5	Matsuyama Club	14	6	1	7	31	23	+8	13
6	Takasho OB Club	14	5	2	7	15	43	−28	12
7	Daio Paper	14	1	2	11	13	61	−48	4
8	Imabari Club	14	0	2	12	5	43	−38	2

Source: RSSSF
Rules for classification: 2 points for a win

=== Kyushu ===
Pos	Team	Pld	W	D	L	GF	GA	GD	Pts
1	Mitsubishi Chemical Kurosaki	9	7	2	0	23	7	+16	16
2	NTT Kyushu	9	6	2	1	21	9	+12	14
3	Tobiume Club	9	7	0	2	20	10	+10	14
4	Kyushu Matsushita Electric	9	4	2	3	20	19	+1	10
5	Mitsubishi Heavy Industries Nagasaki	9	2	5	2	8	7	+1	9
6	Saga Nanyo Club	9	3	1	5	13	17	−4	7
7	Nippon Steel Ōita	9	2	3	4	7	11	−4	7
8	Kagoshima Teachers	9	2	2	5	10	22	−12	6
9	Nakatsu Club	9	2	0	7	8	19	−11	4
10	TOA Construction	9	1	1	7	11	20	−9	3

Source: RSSSF
Rules for classification: 2 points for a win
