= 1994 Japanese Regional Leagues =

Japanese amateur leagues football season

Japanese Regional Leagues
- Season: 1994

Statistics of Japanese Regional Leagues for the 1994 season.

== Champions list ==
Region	Champions
Hokkaido	Nippon Steel Muroran
Tohoku	Tohoku Electric Power
Kantō	Yokogawa Electric
Hokushin'etsu	Hokuriku Electric Power
Tōkai	Jatco
Kansai	NTT Kansai
Chūgoku	Mazda Toyo
Shikoku	Kagawa Shiun
Kyushu	NTT Kyushu

== League standings ==
=== Hokkaido ===
Division 1
Pos	Team	Pld	W	D	L	GF	GA	GD	Pts
1	Nippon Steel Muroran	14	13	0	1	62	16	+46	39
2	Hokuden	14	12	1	1	60	11	+49	37
3	Sapporo	14	9	0	5	41	20	+21	27
4	Ẽfini Sapporo	14	8	2	4	31	30	+1	26
5	JSW Muroran	14	4	0	10	27	50	−23	12
6	Asahikawa Daisetsu Club	14	3	1	10	17	39	−22	10
7	Sapporo First Club	14	2	2	10	11	48	−37	8
8	Blackpecker Hakodate	14	2	0	12	13	48	−35	6

Source: RSSSF

Division 2
Pos	Team	Pld	W	D	L	GF	GA	GD	Pts
1	Nippon Paper Yufutsu	7	5	1	1	20	6	+14	16
2	Hakodate Mazda	7	4	1	2	26	12	+14	13
3	Nippon Oil Muroran	7	4	1	2	17	11	+6	13
4	Sapporo University OB	7	3	3	1	21	10	+11	12
5	Kyokushukai	7	3	0	4	15	15	0	9
6	Shiroishi Club	7	2	2	3	16	26	−10	8
7	Otaru Shuyukai	7	2	1	4	8	21	−13	7
8	Muroran	7	0	1	6	8	30	−22	1

Source: RSSSF

=== Tohoku ===
Pos	Team	Pld	W	D	L	GF	GA	GD	Pts
1	Tohoku Electric Power	14	13	1	0	51	6	+45	27
2	Fukushima	14	10	1	3	51	16	+35	21
3	Matsushima	14	7	3	4	22	18	+4	17
4	Akita City Government	14	3	5	6	19	26	−7	11
5	TDK	14	3	5	6	18	28	−10	11
6	Nakata Club	14	5	1	8	14	34	−20	11
7	Morioka Zebra	14	1	6	7	11	39	−28	8
8	NEC Tokin	14	1	4	9	18	37	−19	6

Source: RSSSF
Rules for classification: 2 points for a win; 1 point for a draw; 0 points for a loss.

=== Kantō ===
Pos	Team	Pld	W	D	L	GF	GA	GD	Pts
1	Yokogawa Electric	18	10	6	2	41	19	+22	26
2	Honda Luminozo Sayama	18	8	6	4	38	27	+11	22
3	Prima Meat Packers	18	10	2	6	36	25	+11	22
4	Kanagawa Teachers	18	8	6	4	34	24	+10	22
5	Saitama Teachers	18	9	2	7	21	26	−5	20
6	Ibaraki Hitachi	18	6	4	8	26	29	−3	16
7	Furukawa Chiba	18	6	4	8	25	35	−10	16
8	Toho Titanium	18	6	3	9	24	27	−3	15
9	Chiba Teachers	18	5	3	10	25	36	−11	13
10	Ome	18	1	6	11	17	39	−22	8

Source: RSSSF
Rules for classification: 2 points for a win; 1 point for a draw; 0 points for a loss.

=== Hokushin'etsu ===
Pos	Team	Pld	W	D	L	GF	GA	GD	Pts
1	Hokuriku Electric Power	9	9	0	0	33	4	+29	18
2	YKK	9	7	0	2	42	10	+32	14
3	Teihens	9	5	3	1	30	14	+16	13
4	Niigata eleven	9	4	1	4	18	13	+5	9
5	Yamaga	9	2	5	2	11	13	−2	9
6	Seiyū Club	9	3	1	5	16	29	−13	7
7	Kanazawa	9	2	3	4	11	26	−15	7
8	Black Rhinos	9	3	0	6	17	28	−11	6
9	Toyama Club	9	2	0	7	12	36	−24	4
10	Fukui Teachers	9	0	3	6	8	25	−17	3

Source: RSSSF
Rules for classification: 2 points for a win; 1 point for a draw; 0 points for a loss.

=== Tōkai ===
Pos	Team	Pld	W	D	L	GF	GA	GD	Pts
1	Jatco	16	13	3	0	72	15	+57	29
2	Denso	16	11	4	1	54	10	+44	26
3	Hitachi Shimizu	16	10	2	4	29	12	+17	22
4	Toyota	16	4	8	4	22	24	−2	16
5	Toyoda Automatic Loom Works	16	3	8	5	21	28	−7	14
6	Nagoya Bank	16	5	4	7	21	41	−20	14
7	Fujieda City Government	16	6	5	5	24	24	0	17
8	Maruyasu	16	5	5	6	24	24	0	15
9	Fujitsu Numazu	16	6	2	8	19	40	−21	14
10	Minolta	16	4	5	7	20	34	−14	13
11	Nagoya	16	3	2	11	15	31	−16	8
12	Kawasaki Heavy Industries Gifu	16	0	4	12	10	48	−38	4

Source: RSSSF
Rules for classification: 2 points for a win; 1 point for a draw; 0 points for a loss.

=== Kansai ===
Pos	Team	Pld	W	D	L	GF	GA	GD	Pts
1	NTT Kansai	18	11	5	2	44	17	+27	38
2	Osaka Gas	18	11	3	4	52	24	+28	36
3	Sanyo Electric Sumoto	18	10	4	4	27	17	+10	32 (Note: 2 points deducted?)
4	Tanabe Pharmaceuticals	18	9	3	6	42	27	+15	30
5	Osaka University of Health and Sport sciences Club	18	7	5	6	27	25	+2	26
6	Central Kobe	18	6	5	7	28	27	+1	23
7	Matsushita Electron	18	6	4	8	28	43	−15	22
8	Kyoto Police	18	5	6	7	19	26	−7	21
9	Mitsubishi Motors Kyoto	18	4	6	8	30	27	+3	18
10	NSK Ishibe	18	0	1	17	9	73	−64	1

Source: RSSSF

=== Chūgoku ===
Pos	Team	Pld	W	D	L	GF	GA	GD	Pts
1	Mazda Toyo	14	9	3	2	34	16	+18	30
2	Mitsubishi Motors Mizushima	14	8	2	4	34	26	+8	26
3	NTN Okayama	14	8	1	5	35	24	+11	25
4	Ẽfini Hiroshima	14	6	1	7	34	35	−1	19
5	Hiroshima Fujita	14	5	3	6	31	29	+2	18
6	Yamaguchi Teachers	14	4	5	5	27	23	+4	17
7	Tottori	14	4	4	6	25	30	−5	16
8	Masuda Club	14	2	1	11	10	47	−37	7

Source: RSSSF

=== Shikoku ===
Pos	Team	Pld	W	D	L	GF	GA	GD	Pts
1	Kagawa Shiun	13	11	1	1	46	12	+34	23
2	Teijin	13	10	1	2	49	16	+33	21
3	Matsuyama Club (Note: After the season was completed, Matsuyama Club changed their name to Ehime FC.)	13	7	2	4	27	18	+9	16
4	NTT Shikoku	13	5	3	5	28	22	+6	13
5	Prima Meat Packers	13	4	1	8	32	34	−2	9
6	Nangoku Club (Note: After the season was completed, Nangoku SC changed their name to Himawari Nangoku SC.)	13	3	1	9	18	45	−27	7
7	Otsuka Pharmaceuticals	13	3	1	9	19	59	−40	7
8	Alex	7	1	0	6	13	26	−13	2

Source: RSSSF
Rules for classification: 2 points for a win; 1 point for a draw; 0 points for a loss.

=== Kyushu ===
Pos	Team	Pld	W	D	L	GF	GA	GD	Pts
1	NTT Kyushu	18	15	2	1	51	13	+38	47
2	TOA Construction	18	13	2	3	43	12	+31	41
3	Fukuoka Dreams	18	9	4	5	40	20	+20	31
4	Mitsubishi Chemical Kurosaki	18	10	1	7	29	30	−1	31
5	Nippon Steel Yawata	18	9	3	6	38	21	+17	30
6	Kagoshima Teachers	18	7	2	9	30	37	−7	23
7	Kumamoto Teachers	18	5	1	12	28	51	−23	16
8	Nippon Steel Oita	18	2	7	9	18	39	−21	13
9	Kyocera Sendai	18	3	4	11	31	59	−28	13
10	Kawasoe Club	18	1	6	11	24	50	−26	9

Source: RSSSF
