= Koya Handa =

Japanese footballer

Koya Handa 半田 航也
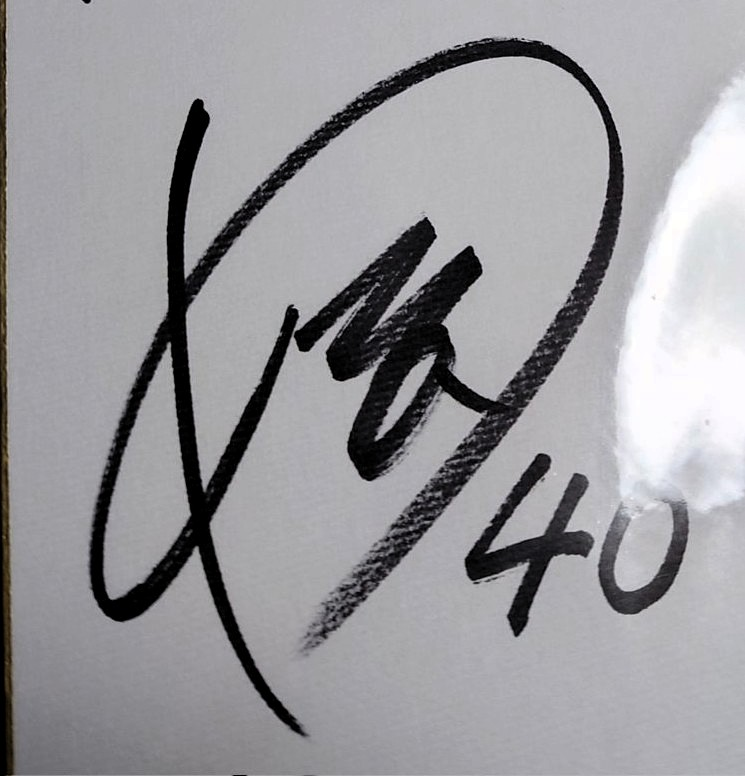

Personal information
- Date of birth: 27 September 1998 (age 28)
- Place of birth: Tenno, Katagami, Akita, Japan
- Height: 1.79 m (5 ft 10 in)
- Position: Forward

Team information
- Current team: Blaublitz Akita
- Number: 18

Youth career
- FC Stinger
- –2017: Blaublitz Akita

College career
Years	Team	Apps	(Gls)
2017–2020	Sapporo University		

Senior career*
Years	Team	Apps	(Gls)
2020–	Blaublitz Akita	38	(6)
2023	→ Verspah Oita (loan)	19	(7)
2025	→ Gainare Tottori (loan)	25	(4)
- * Club domestic league appearances and goals as of 14 August 2026

Koya Handa (半田 航也, Handa Koya; born 27 September 1998) is a Japanese footballer who plays as a forward for Blaublitz Akita.

== Career statistics ==
=== Club ===
As of 7 January 2023.

Club	Season	League			National Cup		League Cup		Other		Total	
Club	Season	Division	Apps	Goals	Apps	Goals	Apps	Goals	Apps	Goals	Apps	Goals
Blaublitz Akita	2020	J3 League	1	0	0	0	–		0	0	1	0
Blaublitz Akita	2021	J2 League	8	0	0	0	–		0	0	8	0
Blaublitz Akita	2022	J2 League	8	2	1	0	–		0	0	9	2
Verspah Oita (loan)	2023	JFL	0	0	0	0	–		0	0	0	0
Career total			17	2	1	0	0	0	0	0	18	2

== Honours ==
Blaublitz Akita

- J3 League (1): 2020
