= Kochi Haruno Athletic Stadium =

Athletic stadium in Haruno, Kōchi, Japan

Coordinates: 33°30′40″N 133°30′10″E

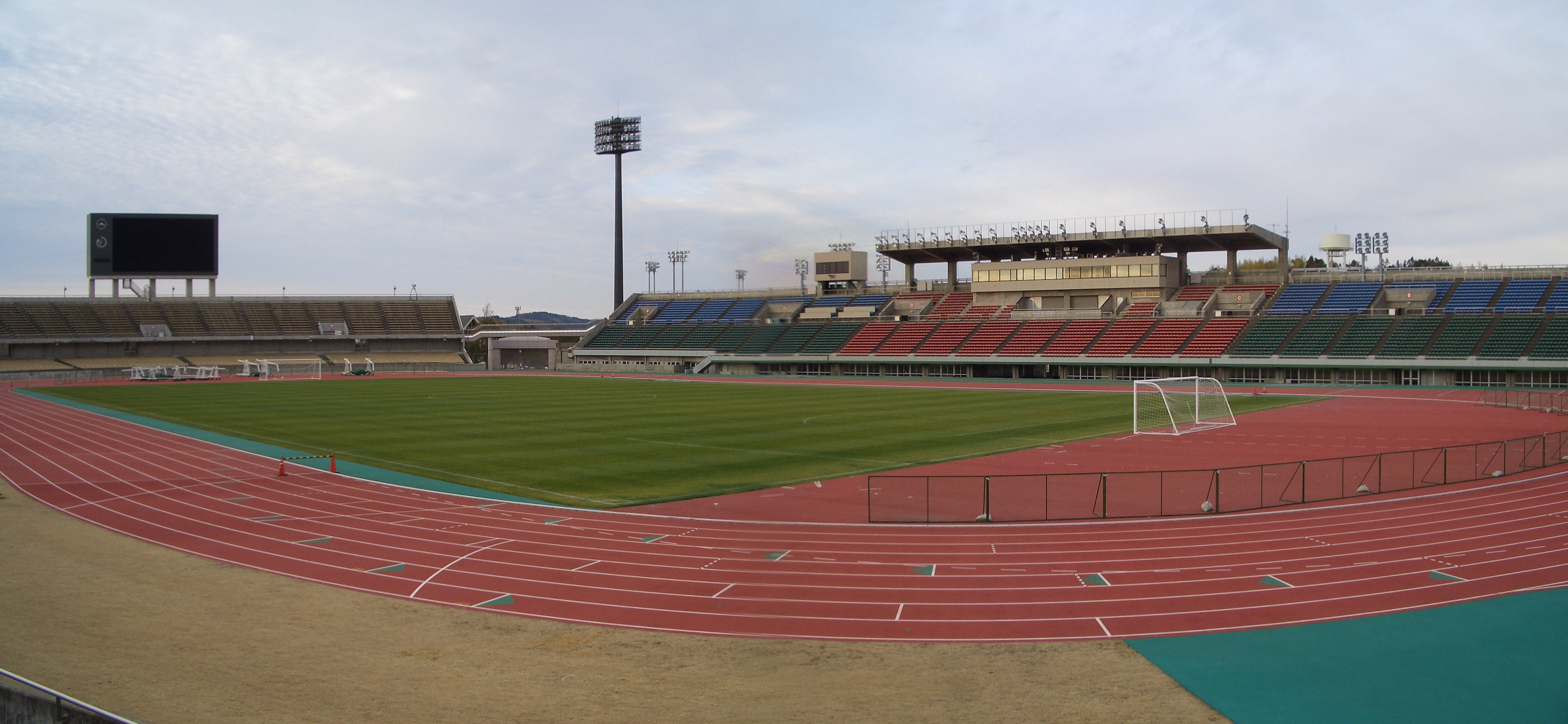
- Interactive map of Kochi Haruno Athletic Stadium
- Location: Haruno, Japan
- Capacity: 25,000
- Surface: Grass

Construction
- Opened: 1987

Tenant
- Kochi United SC

Kochi Haruno Athletic Stadium (高知県立春野総合運動公園陸上競技場), currently known as GIKEN Stadium (GIKEN スタジアム) due to sponsorship reasons, is a multi-purpose stadium in Haruno, Kōchi, Japan. It is currently used mostly for football matches. A few J1 League, J2 League and Emperor's Cup matches had also been played at the stadium. The stadium holds 25,000 people. The facility is owned by Kochi Prefecture, and the Kochi Prefecture Sports Promotion Foundation operates and manages it as a designated manager.

is a track and field stadium located in Kochi Prefectural Harunno Sports Park in Kochi City, Kochi Prefecture. The facility is owned by Kochi Prefecture, and the Kochi Prefecture Sports Promotion Foundation operates and manages it as a designated manager.

== Overview ==
Originally planned as an urban park project in 1973, it opened in 1987 and soon hosted the 1989 High School General Athletic Meet (National High School Sports Festival). Ahead of the 2002 National Sports Festival “Yosakoi Kochi Kokutai,” (ja) renovations began in 1998, boosting capacity from 15,000 to 25,000 and adding large video screens along with new lighting equipment.

Currently, it serves as the home ground for the J3 League team Kochi United. In the past, official J-League matches were held about once a year by Tokushima Vortis and Ehime FC, both based on the island of Shikoku. During the first J-League events in the region, the only stadium meeting the J1 standard of over 15,000 fixed seats—a requirement for an A-grade stadium — was Pikara Stadium in Kagawa Prefecture, with a capacity of 30,099. Now, each prefecture in Shikoku has a stadium that meets J1 standards. On November 11, 2017, a J-League official match was played there for the first time in eight years, when Cerezo Osaka U-23 hosted Gainare Tottori.

The first official Japan Rugby Top League match took place in Kochi Prefecture in December 2007.
