= Renofa Yamaguchi FC =

Japanese football club

Renofa Yamaguchi
- Full name: Renofa Yamaguchi Football Club
- Nickname: Renofa
- Founded: 1949; 77 years ago (as Yamaguchi Teachers)
- Stadium: Ishin Me-Life Stadium
- Capacity: 20,000
- Managing Organisation: Renofa Yamaguchi Co,.Ltd.
- Chairman: Fumihiko Koyama
- Manager: Genki Nakayama
- League: J3 League
- 2025: J2 League, 19th of 20 (relegated)
- Website: renofa.com
Home colours	Away colours

Renofa Yamaguchi FC (レノファ山口, Renofa Yamaguchi Efu Shī) is a Japanese professional football club based in Yamaguchi, the capital of Yamaguchi Prefecture. They set to play in J3 League from 2026–27, the third tier of professional football in Japan's football league system after relegation from J2 League in 2025.

== History ==
The original football team consisted of a group of teaching staff who were based within Yamaguchi prefecture, a team called Yamaguchi Prefecture Teachers Football Club (山口県サッカー教員団, Yamaguchi-ken sakkā kyōin dan), often abbreviated to Yamaguchi Teachers or Yamaguchi KFC (compare Tochigi S.C. and Gainare Tottori, who started as teachers' clubs and are now members of the J.League).

In February 2006, the Yamaguchi Football Association eyed the placement of a team from Yamaguchi in the J.League. Setting its heart of operations at Yamaguchi Teachers, a new football club was established. At the same time, a public appeal was made to name the new club, with Renofa Yamaguchi F.C. being decided in March of the same year. The word renofa is a wasei-eigo, a combination of three English words: renovation, fight, and fine.

Without a specified home ground, the team played Chūgoku league matches across a number of different venues within the prefecture, including Yamaguchi Ishin Park Stadium, Yamaguchi Kirara Expo Memorial Park, Onoda Football Park, Shunan City Athletic Stadium, and Yamaguchi Football Park. Now however, home games are played at Yamaguchi Ishin Park Stadium.

Though structured with a hometown manager and local players, sponsored by local business and enterprises, and local action plans within the local community, Renofa Yamaguchi F.C. is aiming for a national future in the J.League.

In the days of Yamaguchi Teachers, the team frequently finished mid to low table in the Chūgoku league. However, since the establishing of the new club in 2006, the team has consistently improved their final league position. This culminated in the 2008 season where they achieved their first league win. In the All Japan Regional Football Promotion League Series of that year the team finished fourth in the final round, missing the opportunity for promotion to the Japan Football League. The 2009 season saw them win their first Emperor's Cup match, beating Mitsubishi Motors Mizushima F.C. in a penalty shoot out.

Since the team's formation it had operated as a private organisation, however when the Nonprofit organization Yamaguchi Athletics Club was established on 24 May 2011, managing control of the team changed hands putting the new NPO in charge.

After finishing in 4th place in the 2014 Japan Football League and securing the necessary licensing, the J.League officially welcomed Renofa Yamaguchi to join the J3 League, starting from the 2015 season. Their J.League debut came in 2015 season. On 23 November 2015, Renofa earned their first and successful promotion from the JFL after winning the J3 League. The club was promoted for the J2 League ahead of the 2016 season. The club was guaranteed promotion after a 2–2 draw against Gainare Tottori in the closing rounds of the season, as Renofa were working towards J2 licensing before the season ended, for the promotion to be actually earned.

On September 26, 2023, Renofa Yamaguchi announced that they had officially been granted a J1 License.

In 2025, Renofa Yamaguchi were relegated to the J3 League for the next season after finishing 19th, marking their worst performance in the league and ending a nine-year run in the second tier.

== Changes in club name ==
- Yamaguchi Prefecture Teachers Football Club (山口県サッカー教員団, Yamaguchi-ken sakkā kyōin dan) (Yamaguchi Teachers, Yamaguchi KFC) (1949–2005)
- Renofa Yamaguchi FC (レノファ山口FC, Renofa Yamaguchi Efu Shī) (2006–)

== League & cup record ==
Champions	Runners-up	Third place	Promoted	Relegated

League												J. League Cup	Emperor's Cup	Notes
Season	Division	Pos.	P	W	D	L	F	A	GD	Pts	Attendance/G	J. League Cup	Emperor's Cup	Notes
Yamaguchi Teachers
1976												Not eligible	1st round	
1980	Chūgoku; League	6th	14	4	3	7	27	30	−3	11		Not eligible		
1981	Chūgoku; League	7th	14	3	4	7	29	31	−2	10		Not eligible		
1982	Chūgoku; League	2nd	14	8	3	3	34	21	13	19		Not eligible	1st round	
1983	Chūgoku; League	2nd	14	8	3	3	35	23	12	19		Not eligible		
1984	Chūgoku; League	4th	14	8	5	1	38	27	11	17		Not eligible		
1985	Chūgoku; League	5th	14	6	1	7	30	29	1	13		Not eligible		
1986	Chūgoku; League	3rd	14	7	3	4	34	24	10	17		Not eligible		
1987	Chūgoku; League	3rd	12	6	2	4	18	16	2	14		Not eligible		
1988	Chūgoku; League	3rd	16	7	3	6	34	26	8	17		Not eligible		
1989	Chūgoku; League	2nd	12	7	3	2	28	15	13	17		Not eligible		
1990	Chūgoku; League	4th	16	7	3	6	32	25	7	17		Not eligible		
1991	Chūgoku; League	4th	14	7	1	6	31	28	3	22		Not eligible		
1992	Chūgoku; League	6th	14	4	1	9	19	28	−9	13		Not eligible		
1993	Chūgoku; League	3rd	14	6	4	4	23	18	5	22		Not eligible		
1994	Chūgoku; League	6th	14	4	5	5	27	23	4	17		Not eligible		
1995	Chūgoku; League	8th	14	2	5	7	26	30	−4	11		Not eligible		
1996	Chūgoku; League	6th	14	3	6	5	17	35	−18	15		Not eligible		
1997	Chūgoku; League	8th	14	1	3	10	14	31	−17	7		Not eligible		1 match won, 2 matches lost on penalties. Relegated to Yamaguchi Prefecture League.
1998	Yamaguchi; Prefecture; League											Not eligible		
1999	Yamaguchi; Prefecture; League											Not eligible	1st round	Promoted to Chūgoku League.
2000	Chūgoku League	5th	14	6	1	7	20	34	−14	20		Not eligible		1 match won on penalties.
2001	Chūgoku League	7th	12	3	2	7	17	30	−13	12		Not eligible	1st round	1 match won, 1 match lost on penalties.
2002	Chūgoku League	4th	10	3	2	5	17	31	−14	12		Not eligible		1 match won, 1 match lost on penalties. Winners of the Chūgoku League fair play award.
2003	Chūgoku League	8th	14	1	5	8	8	22	−14	11		Not eligible	1st round	3 matches won, 2 matches lost on penalties. Winners of the Chūgoku League fair play award. Relegated to Yamaguchi Prefecture League.
2004	Yamaguchi; Prefecture; League	1st	10	8	0	2				24		Not eligible	1st round	Promoted to Chūgoku League.
2005	Chūgoku League	7th	12	1	4	7	11	23	−12	9		Not eligible		2 matches won, 2 matches lost on penalties.
Renofa Yamaguchi FC
2006	Chūgoku League	4th	14	7	3	4	25	28	−3	25		Not eligible		
2007	Chūgoku League	3rd	17	6	4	7	33	46	−13	22		Not eligible	1st round	
2008	Chūgoku League	1st	16	11	5	0	45	15	30	38		Not eligible		Finalist in the Promotional Series
2009	Chūgoku League	2nd	18	13	1	4	53	21	32	40		Not eligible	2nd round	
2010	Chūgoku League	1st	18	14	1	3	51	17	34	43		Not eligible	2nd round	
2011	Chūgoku League	2nd	18	13	2	3	54	17	37	41		Not eligible	2nd round	
2012	Chūgoku League	4th	18	9	5	4	47	22	25	32		Not eligible		
2013	Chūgoku League	1st	18	13	3	2	53	13	40	42		Not eligible	1st round	Promoted to JFL
2014	JFL	4th	26	16	3	7	51	27	24	51	2,297	Not eligible		Promoted to J3
2015	J3	1st	36	25	3	8	96	36	60	78	4,367	Not eligible	1st round	Promoted to J2
2016	J2	12th	42	14	11	17	55	63	-8	53	6,654	Not eligible	3rd round	
2017	J2	20th	42	11	5	26	48	69	-21	38	5,454	Not eligible	2nd round	
2018	J2	8th	42	16	13	13	63	64	-1	61	6,123	Not eligible	3rd round	
2019	J2	15th	42	13	8	21	54	70	-16	47	5,630	Not eligible	3rd round	
2020 †	J2	22nd	42	9	6	27	43	74	-31	33	1,976	Not eligible	Did not qualify	
2021 †	J2	15th	42	10	13	19	37	51	-14	43	3,011	Not eligible	1st round	
2022	J2	16th	42	13	11	18	51	54	-3	50	3,661	Not eligible	3rd round	
2023	J2	20th	42	10	14	18	37	67	-30	44	4,407	Not eligible	2nd round	
2024	J2	11th	38	15	8	15	43	44	-1	53	6,089	1st round	TBC	
2025	J2	19th	38	7	15	16	36	47	-11	36	5,767	3rd round	2nd round	
2026	J3	14th	18	7	5	6	24	22	2	29	4,847	N/A	N/A	
2026-27	J3	TBD	38									TBD	TBD	

Key

- Pos. = Position in league; P = Games played; W = Games won; D = Games drawn; L = Games lost; F = Goals scored; A = Goals conceded; GD = Goals difference; Pts = Points gained
- Attendance/G = Average home league attendance
- † 2020 & 2021 seasons attendances reduced by COVID-19 worldwide pandemic
- Source: J.League Data Site

== Honours ==
Renofa Yamaguchi honours
Honour	No.	Years
Yamaguchi Prefectural Championship Emperor's Cup Yamaguchi Prefectural Qualifiers	7	1999, 2001, 2003, 2004, 2007, 2009, 2010
Yamaguchi Prefectural League	1	2004
Chūgoku League	3	2008, 2010, 2013
Noue Cup	1	2008
Shakaijin Cup	1	2013
J3 League	1	2015

== Players ==
=== Current squad ===
As of 1 August 2026.

Note: Flags indicate national team as defined under FIFA eligibility rules; some limited exceptions apply. Players may hold more than one non-FIFA nationality.

No.	Pos.	Nation	Player
2	MF	JPN	Ryota Ozawa
3	DF	JPN	Kazuki Oiwa
4	MF	JPN	Kensei Nakashima
5	DF	JPN	Keita Yoshioka
6	MF	JPN	Yuji Wakasa
7	MF	JPN	Naoto Misawa
8	FW	JPN	Kazuya Noyori
10	MF	JPN	Joji Ikegami
11	FW	JPN	Kosuke Fujioka
13	FW	JPN	Sota Watanabe
14	DF	JPN	Ryusei Shimodo
15	DF	JPN	Takeru Itakura
17	MF	JPN	Kohei Tanabe
18	DF	JPN	Masashi Kamekawa
19	FW	JPN	Shunsuke Yamamoto
21	GK	KOR	Choi Hyung-chan
22	FW	JPN	Seiichiro Kubo

No.	Pos.	Nation	Player
24	MF	JPN	Kosei Numata
25	MF	JPN	Sota Fujimori
27	MF	JPN	Kota Suwa
28	MF	JPN	Seigo Kobayashi
32	MF	JPN	Takumi Ito (on loan from Kataller Toyama)
33	DF	JPN	Shūta Kikuchi
35	GK	JPN	Kei Uchiyama
36	MF	JPN	Hisatoshi Nishido
40	MF	JPN	Hikaru Naruoka
41	GK	JPN	Masahiro Iida (on loan from Tokyo Verdy)
43	DF	JPN	Junya Suzuki (on loan from Yokohama FC)
47	MF	JPN	Towa Matsushita
48	MF	JPN	Yuta Arai (on loan from FC Tokyo)
70	FW	JPN	Riku Gunji (on loan from Shimizu S-Pulse)
77	DF	JPN	Ryuhei Yamamoto
88	MF	JPN	Naoki Nomura
99	GK	JPN	Masaki Endo

=== Out on loan ===
Note: Flags indicate national team as defined under FIFA eligibility rules; some limited exceptions apply. Players may hold more than one non-FIFA nationality.

No.	Pos.	Nation	Player
20	FW	JPN	Toa Suenaga (at (Singapore) FC Jurong)
49	DF	JPN	Yuya Mineda (at Azul Claro Numazu)
81	MF	JPN	Yuma Kimura (at (Singapore) Tampines Rovers FC)

== Club officials ==
Club officials for 2025 season.

Position	Staff
Manager	(Japan) Genki Nakayama
Head coach	(Japan) Hideo Yoshizawa
Coach	(Japan) Ryo Yokotani
Goalkeeper coach	(Japan) Kenji Yamada
Physical Coach	(Japan) Tetsuya Sakamoto
Assistant coaches	(Japan) Kensuke Akasaka (Japan) Kensuke Sato
Doctor	(Japan) Toru Moriwaki
Fitness coach	(Japan) Tomoyuki Sato
Physical coach	(Japan) Junichi Matsumoto
Chief trainer	(Japan) Tomoyuki Sato
Trainers	(Japan) Atsushi Noto (Japan) Akihiko Masunari
Physiotherapist	(Japan) Takashi Sasaki
Competent	(Japan) Hiroki Fujikawa
Deputy officers	(Japan) Taiyo Kodama (Japan) Rui Nagao
Interpreter	(Japan) Yuto Kabazawa

== Managerial history ==
League matches only.Updated end of 2025 season

Manager	Nationality	Tenure		Managerial Record				
Manager	Nationality	From	To	P	W	D	L	W%
Takashi Yamamoto	Japan	1990	31 January 2006					
Takashi Miyanari	Japan	1 February 2006	31 January 2010					
Takashi Kawamura	Japan	1 February 2012	31 January 2013					
Genki Nakayama	Japan	1 February 2013	31 January 2014					
Nobuhiro Ueno	Japan	1 February 2014	23 May 2017	119	57	21	41	47.90
Shinji Sarusawa	Japan	24 May 2017	5 June 2017	2	0	0	2	0.00
Carlos Mayor	Argentina	6 June 2017	31 December 2017	25	9	1	15	36.00
Masahiro Shimoda	Japan	1 February 2018	31 January 2021	130	40	27	63	30.77
Susumu Watanabe	Japan	1 February 2021	28 September 2021	31	8	8	15	25.81
Yoshihiro Natsuka	Japan	29 September 2021	9 May 2023	67	18	21	28	26.87
Genki Nakayama	Japan	10 May 2023	7 June 2023	4	0	1	3	0.00
Juan Esnáider	Argentina	8 June 2023	13 November 2023	23	6	7	10	26.09
Ryo Shigaki	Japan	1 December 2023	24 June 2025	58	18	16	24	31.03
Genki Nakayama	Japan	24 June 2025	present	18	4	7	7	22.22

Key

- Source: J.League Data Site

== Kit evolution ==
Home Kits - 1st
2006 - 2007	2008 - 2011	2012	2013	2014
2015	2016	2017	2018	2019
2020	2021	2022	2023	2024
2025	2026 -			

Away Kits - 2nd
2006 - 2007	2008 - 2011	2012	2013	2014
2015	2016	2017	2018	2019
2020	2021	2022	2023	2024
2025	2026 -			
