= Blaublitz Akita =

Association football club

Coordinates: 39°43′9.2″N 140°6′20.1″E

Blaublitz Akita ブラウブリッツ秋田
- Full name: Blaublitz Akita
- Nickname: Blaublitz
- Short name: BB, BBA
- Founded: 1965; 61 years ago as TDK SC; 2010; 16 years ago as Blaublitz Akita
- Stadium: Soyu Stadium (Akita, Akita Prefecture)
- Capacity: 20,125; J.League:18,560
- Chairman: Kosuke Iwase
- Manager: Ken Yoshida
- League: J2 League
- 2025: J2 League, 14th of 20
- Website: blaublitz.jp
| Home colours | Away colours |

Blaublitz Akita (ブラウブリッツ秋田, Burauburittsu Akita) is a Japanese professional association football team based in Akita, capital of Akita Prefecture. The club currently play in the J2 League, Japanese second tier of professional football league. Due to the club's former ownership by TDK and thus formerly known as the TDK SC, most of the players were employees of TDK's Akita factory.

The club has won 2 J3 League title in the 2017 season and the 2020 season respectively.

== History ==
The club based in Nikaho, Akita, was founded in 1965 as TDK Sports Club. They were promoted to the Tohoku Regional League in 1982. They played in the Japan Soccer League Division 2 in 1985 and 1986. They were the only club in Tohoku region competing in the JSL.

In 2006, TDK SC won the Tohoku Regional League championship for the fifth straight year. They were automatically promoted to the Japan Football League after they won the National Regional League Playoffs.

The team has announced that it would separate from its parent company and join the J. League if the club's final yearly standing should ever allow promotion.

=== As Blaublitz Akita ===
In May, 2009, TDK SC announced that the football club will become independent for the 2010 season and be based around Akita. Later in 2010 the club's name was changed to "Blaublitz Akita". Blau and Blitz mean blue and lightning in German respectively.

In 2014 they entered the J3 League after previously playing in the Japan Football League, the third tier of the Japanese association football league system until promotion to J2 in 2020.

The club moved to Akita City and entered the J3 League for the 2014 season. The club finished 8th in each of its first two years in the professional competition. In the 2017 season, their fourth, they won the title, however due to their lacking a license to play upper-tier football, they were not promoted, becoming the first professional third-tier champion not to be promoted. However, Akita acquired the J2 license on September 27, 2018, after which they won the title again in the 2020 season, returning to the second tier for the first time in 34 years.

== Team image ==
=== Former crest ===
1985–2006

=== Supporters ===
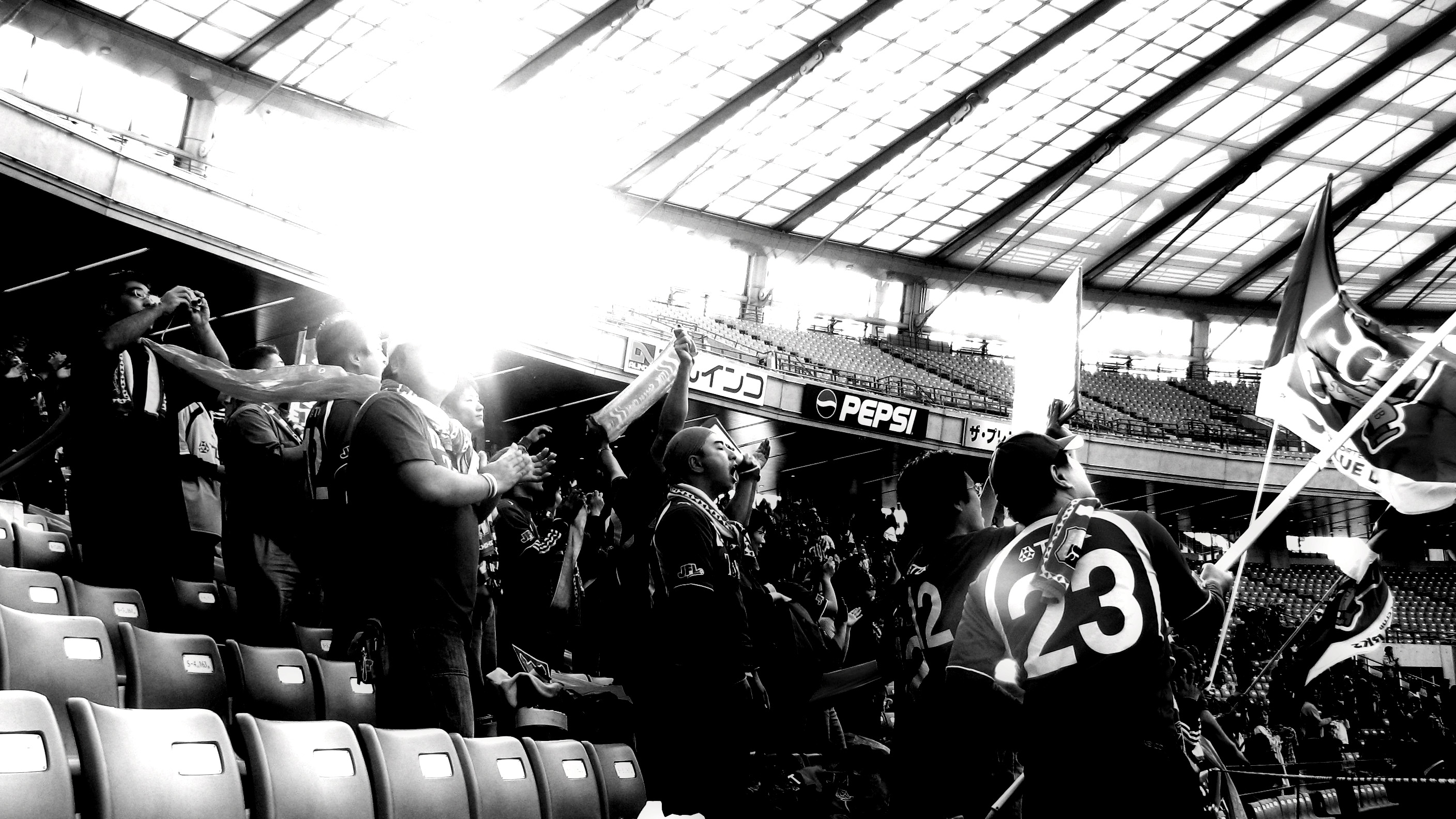
The club fans in 2007.

Blaublitz Akita's main active supporters' group is called the 'Blue Tasu Akita'.

=== Team mascots ===
The official team mascot is an 8-year-old Ryūjin, named Blaugon and wears #00.

=== Songs and chants ===
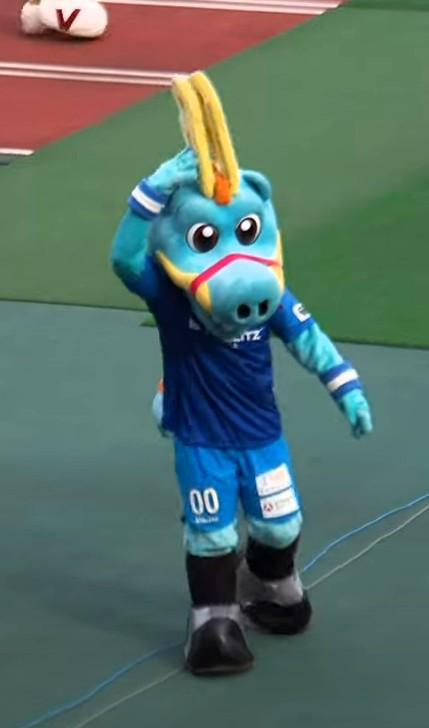
- Blaugon
  Akita Prefectural Anthem - song
- We are Akita - song, Rakan edition composed by Berabow
- Akita Olé - song, champ edition

=== Rivalries ===
==== Ōu Honsen (Dewa derby) ====
TDK and NEC Yamagata first met in 1990 in old Tohoku regional football league. The two clubs have been based in former Dewa Province, and their rivalry is renamed as Ōu Honsen after the Japan Railways Ōu Main Line in 2021. Blaublitz Akita still maintains regional rivalries with Montedio Yamagata. Matches between Blaublitz Akita and Montedio Yamagata are sometimes referred to as the Ōu Main Line Derby, named after the Ōu Main Line railway that connects the cities of Akita and Yamagata. The fixture represents a competitive regional clash between neighbouring prefectures in northern Japan.

- Tohoku derby
- Battle of Ōshū

== Stadium ==
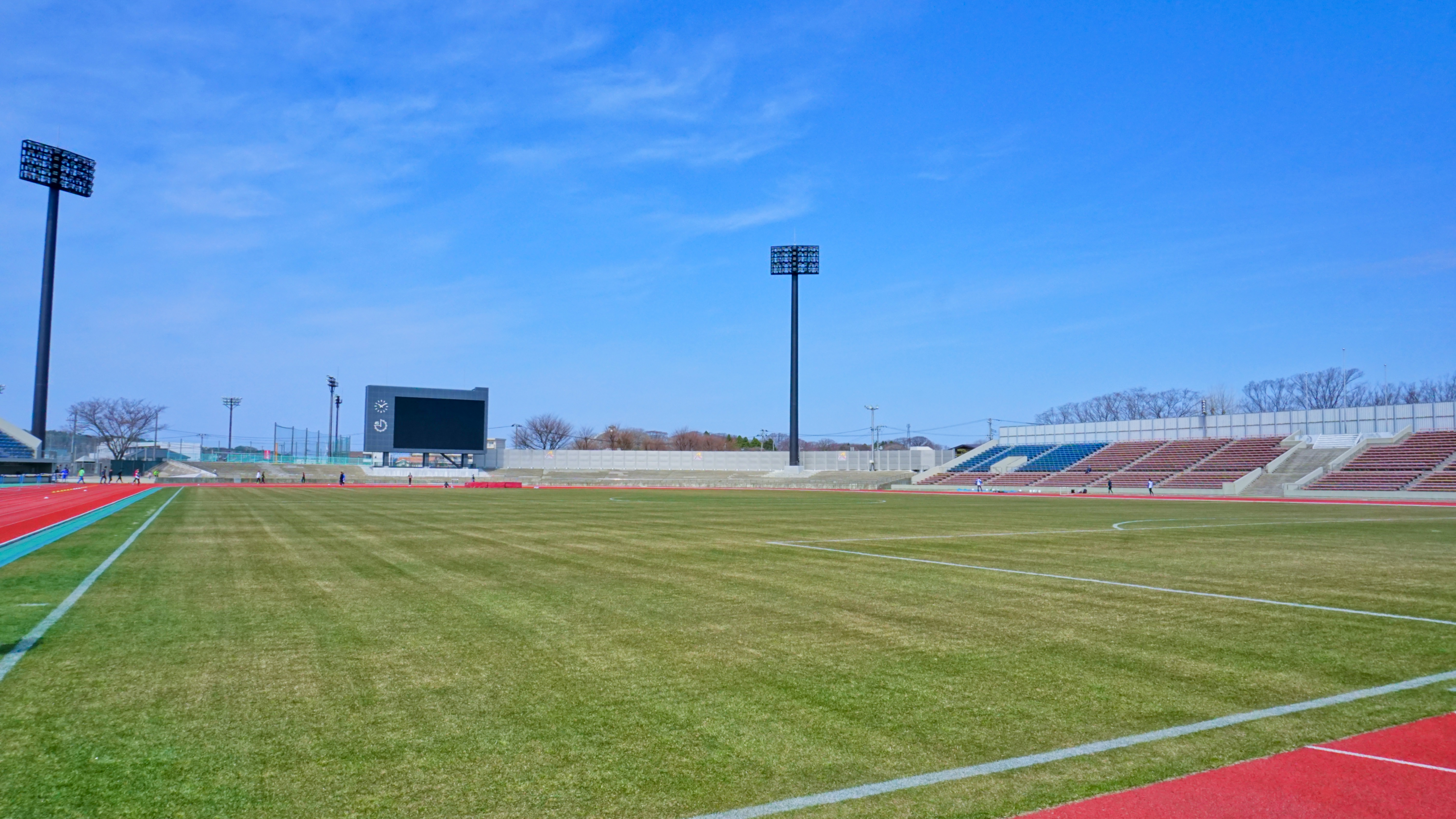
Soyu Stadium

The home stadium of Blaublitz Akita is the Soyu Stadium, also known as "Yabase". Located in Akita, Akita Prefecture, Japan. Opened in 1941 and renovated several times to meet modern football standards, the stadium serves as the club’s primary venue for matches in the J2 League. With a capacity of around 20,125 spectators, Soyu Stadium features a traditional athletics-track layout and is part of the larger Akita Yabase Sports Park. The venue provides a distinctive matchday atmosphere, with supporters of Blaublitz Akita gathering in the main stands behind the goals, creating an energetic environment for home fixtures. The stadium has become an important landmark for football in Akita and plays a central role in the club’s connection with the local community. The club practices at the adjacent Akita Sports Plus ASP Stadium and Space Project Dream Field.

== Kit suppliers and shirt sponsors ==
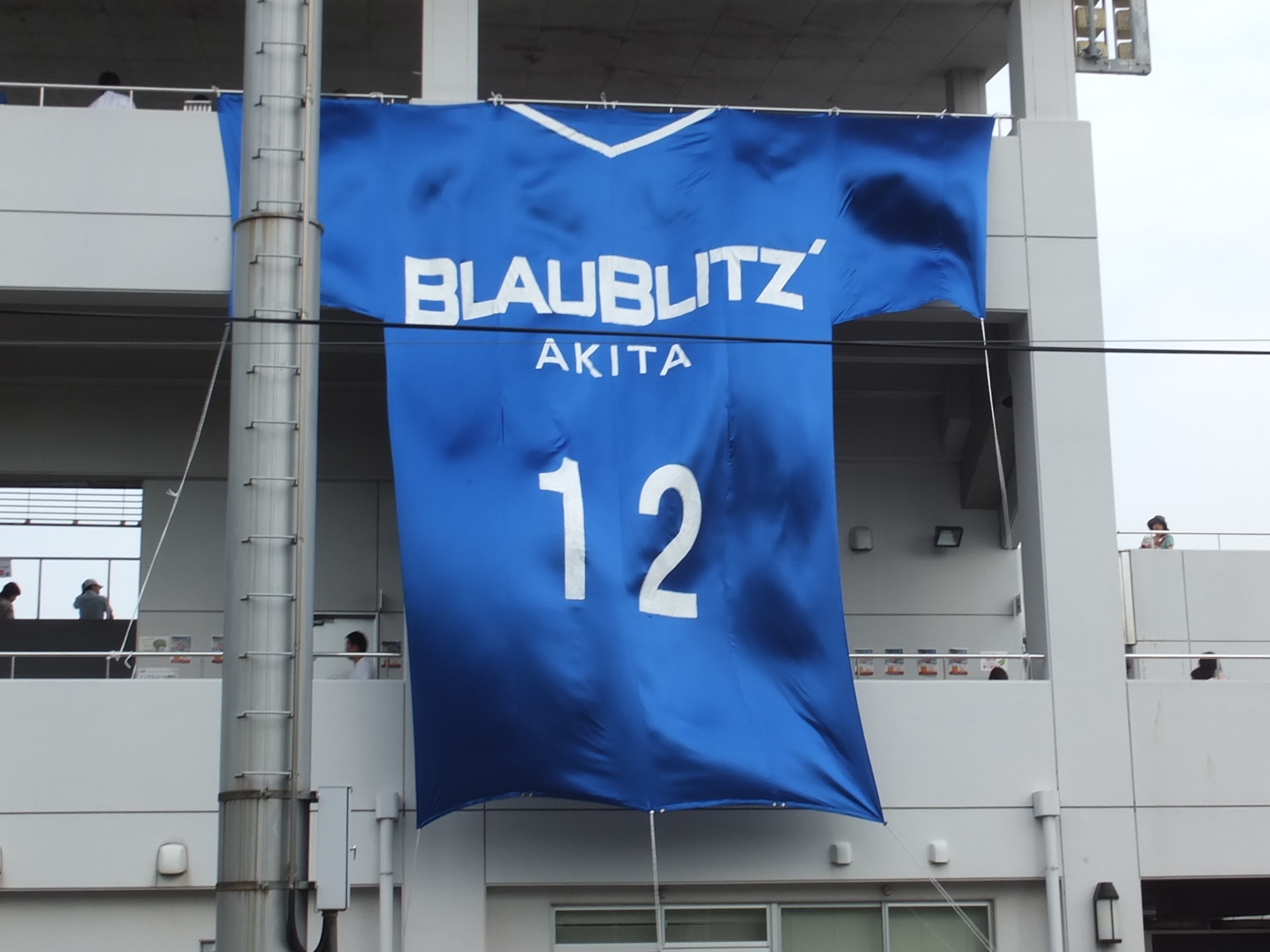

=== Kit evolution ===
Home kits - 1st
| 2010 - 2011 | 2012 | 2013 | 2014 | 2015 |
| 2016 | 2017 | 2018 | 2019 | 2020 |
| 2021 | 2022 | 2023 | 2024 | 2025 |
2026 -

Away kits - 2nd
| 2010 - 2011 | 2012 | 2013 | 2014 | 2015 |
| 2016 | 2017 | 2018 | 2019 | 2020 |
| 2021 | 2022 | 2023 | 2024 | 2025 - |
2026 -

== Affiliated clubs ==
- TDK Shinwakai (Tohoku Soccer League Division 2 North) – Based in Nikaho, Akita.
- Tsuruoka TDK

=== TShirt sponsorship by TDK ===
- (Netherlands) AFC Ajax (1982–1991)
- (England) Crystal Palace (1993–1999)

== Players ==
=== First-team squad ===
As of 14 September 2026.

Note: Flags indicate national team as defined under FIFA eligibility rules; some limited exceptions apply. Players may hold more than one non-FIFA nationality.

| No. | Pos. | Nation | Player |
|---|---|---|---|
| 1 | GK | JPN | Genki Yamada |
| 2 | DF | JPN | Ryohei Okazaki |
| 3 | DF | JPN | Ryoya Iizumi |
| 4 | DF | JPN | Jun Okano |
| 5 | DF | JPN | Kazuma Nagai |
| 7 | MF | JPN | Takuma Mizutani |
| 8 | FW | JPN | Kaito Umeda |
| 9 | MF | JPN | Ryota Nakamura |
| 11 | FW | JPN | Kosuke Sagawa |
| 13 | DF | JPN | Ryuji Saito |
| 14 | MF | JPN | Ryuhei Oishi |
| 16 | MF | JPN | Masakazu Yoshioka |
| 17 | DF | JPN | Takato Nonomura |
| 18 | FW | JPN | Koya Handa |
| 22 | DF | JPN | Hidenori Takahashi |
| 23 | GK | JPN | Soki Yatagai |

| No. | Pos. | Nation | Player |
|---|---|---|---|
| 24 | FW | JPN | Shohei Aihara |
| 25 | MF | JPN | Tomofumi Fujiyama |
| 27 | MF | JPN | Takuro Iwai (on loan from JEF United Chiba) |
| 29 | MF | JPN | Chie Edoojon Kawakami (on loan from Fujieda MYFC) |
| 32 | DF | JPN | Takumi Hasegawa |
| 34 | FW | JPN | Shota Suzuki |
| 37 | MF | JPN | Makoto Tanaka ^{DSP} |
| 38 | GK | JPN | Cailen Hill (on loan from Sanfrecce Hiroshima) |
| 40 | DF | JPN | Dai Hirase |
| 42 | DF | JPN | Atsuki Kanda ^{Type 2} |
| 43 | DF | JPN | Junyu Terakado ^{Type 2} |
| 44 | MF | JPN | Shuta Nagasawa ^{Type 2} |
| 47 | GK | JPN | Tomoki Horiuchi |
| 66 | MF | JPN | Koki Doi |
| 71 | DF | JPN | Hiroki Hatahashi |
| 77 | MF | JPN | Yoshihiro Nakano |

=== Out on loan ===
Note: Flags indicate national team as defined under FIFA eligibility rules; some limited exceptions apply. Players may hold more than one non-FIFA nationality.

| No. | Pos. | Nation | Player |
|---|---|---|---|
| — | MF | JPN | Masaki Nishimura (at Giravanz Kitakyushu) |

== Management and staff ==
| Position | Name |
|---|---|
| Manager | (Japan) Ken Yoshida |
| Assistant manager | (Japan) Hirotaka Usui |
| First-team coach | (Japan) Shota Sakagawa (Japan) Masanori Tamo |
| Goalkeeper coach | (Japan) Hirohito Ito |
| Analytical coach | (Japan) Haruki Sasaki |
| Chief trainer | (Japan) Yuta Kobayashi |
| Trainer | (Japan) Kaichi Hiraoka (Japan) Ryota Kanagaya |
| Competent | (Japan) Taichi Matsuda |
| Side affairs | (Japan) Hiromasa Nishizawa |

== Honours ==
| Type | Honours | Titles | Season |
|---|---|---|---|
| League | J3 League | 2 | 2017, 2020 |
| League | Tohoku Soccer League | 11 | 1982, 1983, 1984, 1988, 1989, 2000, 2002, 2003, 2004, 2005 (shared with Grulla Morioka), 2006 |
| League | Regional Promotion Series | 1 | 2006 |
| League | Akita Prefectural Football Championship Emperor's Cup Akita Prefectural Qualifiers | 10 | 2010, 2011, 2012, 2013, 2014, 2015, 2016, 2017, 2018, 2019 |

Bold is for those competition that are currently active.

== Managerial history ==
| Manager | Tenure | |
| Manager | Start | Finish |
|---|---|---|
| (Japan) Kazuaki Sato | 1988 | ? |
| (Japan) Norio Sasaki | ? | 31 January 1998 |
| (Japan) Tsutomu Komatsu | 1 February 1999 | 31 January 2007 |
| (Japan) Hisao Sasaki | 1 February 2008 | 31 January 2009 |
| (Japan) Hirotoshi Yokoyama | 1 February 2010 | 31 January 2011 |
| (Japan) Yuji Yokoyama | 1 February 2012 | 31 January 2013 |
| (Japan) George Yonashiro | 1 February 2013 | 31 January 2014 |
| (Japan) Shuichi Mase | 1 February 2015 | 31 January 2016 |
| (Japan) Koichi Sugiyama | 1 February 2017 | 11 July 2018 |
| (Japan) Shuichi Mase | 12 July 2018 | 31 January 2019 |
| (Japan) Ken Yoshida | 1 February 2020 | Current |

== Club captains ==
| # | Name | Captaincy years |
|---|---|---|
| - | Akira Sasaki | JSL Era |
| 7 | Satoshi Sato | |
| 17 | Moriyasu Saito | |
| 4 | Masatoshi Ozawa | 2007–2009 |
| 18 | Satoshi Yokoyama | 2010 |
| 2 | Hiroyuki Kobayashi | 2011 |
| 10 | Masatoshi Matsuda | 2012–2013 |
| 10 | Shingo Kumabayashi | 2014 |
| 4 | Toshio Shimakawa | 2015 |
| 24 | Naoyuki Yamada | 2016–2018 |
| 39; 24 | Hiroki Kotani; Naoyuki Yamada | 2019 |
| 24 | Naoyuki Yamada | 2020 |
| 9 | Ryota Nakamura | 2021 |
| 23 | Shuto Inaba | 2022 |
| 33 | Ryutaro Iio | 2023 |
| 6 | Hiroto Morooka | 2024–present |

== Season by season record ==
| Champions | Runners-up | Third place | Promoted | Relegated |

| League | | | | | | | | | | | | | | J. League Cup | Emperor's Cup |
| Season | Div. | Tier | Teams | Pos. | P | W | D | L | F | A | GD | Pts | Attendance/G | J. League Cup | Emperor's Cup |
|---|---|---|---|---|---|---|---|---|---|---|---|---|---|---|---|
TDK
| 1982 | Tohoku | 3 | 8 | 1st | 14 | 11 | 3 | 0 | 41 | 12 | 29 | 25 | - | — | - |
| 1983 | Tohoku | 3 | 8 | 1st | 14 | 13 | 1 | 0 | 76 | 13 | 63 | 27 | - | — | - |
| 1984 | Tohoku | 3 | 8 | 1st | 14 | 11 | 1 | 2 | 50 | 15 | 35 | 23 | - | — | 1st round |
| 1985 | JSL2 | 2 | 12 | 12th | 14 | 0 | 3 | 11 | 12 | 48 | -36 | 3 | - | — | - |
| 1986 | JSL2 | 2 | 16 | 15th | 20 | 0 | 1 | 19 | 21 | 111 | -90 | 2 | - | — | - |
| 1987 | Tohoku | 3 | 8 | 3rd | 14 | 10 | 2 | 2 | 51 | 15 | 36 | 22 | - | — | 1st round |
| 1988 | Tohoku | 3 | 8 | 1st | 14 | 12 | 0 | 2 | 48 | 13 | 35 | 24 | - | — | 1st round |
| 1989 | Tohoku | 3 | 8 | 1st | 14 | 11 | 2 | 1 | 49 | 11 | 38 | 24 | - | — | 1st round |
| 1990 | Tohoku | 3 | 8 | 2nd | 14 | 9 | 3 | 2 | 31 | 13 | 18 | 21 | - | — | - |
| 1991 | Tohoku | 3 | 8 | 3rd | 14 | 8 | 1 | 5 | 27 | 26 | 1 | 17 | - | — | - |
| 1992 | Tohoku | 4 | 8 | 5th | 14 | 6 | 2 | 6 | 18 | 24 | -6 | 14 | - | — | - |
| 1993 | Tohoku | 4 | 8 | 5th | 14 | 4 | 3 | 7 | 22 | 30 | -8 | 11 | - | — | - |
| 1994 | Tohoku | 3 | 8 | 5th | 14 | 3 | 5 | 6 | 18 | 28 | -10 | 11 | - | — | - |
| 1995 | Tohoku | 3 | 8 | 5th | 14 | 4 | 5 | 5 | 20 | 23 | -3 | 13 | - | — | - |
| 1996 | Tohoku | 3 | 8 | 5th | 14 | 6 | 2 | 6 | 25 | 24 | 1 | 14 | - | — | 1st round |
| 1997 | Tohoku | 3 | 8 | 3rd | 14 | 6 | 2 | 6 | 28 | 27 | 1 | 20 | - | — | - |
| 1998 | Tohoku | 3 | 8 | 3rd | 14 | 8 | 1 | 5 | 30 | 18 | 12 | 25 | - | — | 1st round |
| 1999 | Tohoku | 4 | 8 | 2nd | 14 | 7 | 5 | 2 | 35 | 13 | 22 | 26 | - | — | 1st round |
| 2000 | Tohoku | 4 | 8 | 1st | 14 | 11 | 1 | 2 | 41 | 11 | 30 | 35 | - | — | 1st round |
| 2001 | Tohoku | 4 | 8 | 2nd | 14 | 9 | 2 | 3 | 41 | 12 | 29 | 29 | - | — | - |
| 2002 | Tohoku | 4 | 8 | 1st | 14 | 13 | 1 | 0 | 39 | 6 | 33 | 40 | - | — | 1st round |
| 2003 | Tohoku | 4 | 8 | 1st | 14 | 8 | 5 | 1 | 38 | 12 | 26 | 29 | - | — | 2nd round |
| 2004 | Tohoku | 4 | 8 | 1st | 14 | 11 | 1 | 2 | 43 | 10 | 33 | 34 | - | — | 1st round |
| 2005 | Tohoku | 4 | 8 | 1st | 14 | 9 | 2 | 1 | 36 | 10 | 26 | 29 | - | — | 1st round |
| 2006 | Tohoku | 4 | 8 | 1st | 14 | 14 | 0 | 0 | 58 | 7 | 51 | 42 | - | — | 2nd round |
| 2007 | JFL | 3 | 18 | 13th | 34 | 11 | 9 | 14 | 49 | 47 | 2 | 42 | 983 | — | 4th round |
| 2008 | JFL | 3 | 18 | 13th | 34 | 10 | 11 | 13 | 48 | 47 | 1 | 41 | 951 | — | 1st round |
| 2009 | JFL | 3 | 18 | 10th | 34 | 14 | 4 | 16 | 39 | 54 | -15 | 46 | 741 | — | 1st round |
Blaublitz Akita
| 2010 | JFL | 3 | 18 | 8th | 34 | 14 | 9 | 11 | 54 | 41 | 13 | 51 | 1,256 | — | 2nd round |
| 2011 | JFL | 3 | 18 | 14th | 33 | 10 | 7 | 16 | 38 | 52 | -14 | 37 | 1,274 | — | 2nd round |
| 2012 | JFL | 3 | 17 | 13th | 32 | 9 | 10 | 13 | 33 | 41 | -8 | 37 | 1,136 | — | 2nd round |
| 2013 | JFL | 3 | 18 | 8th | 34 | 14 | 8 | 12 | 48 | 45 | 3 | 50 | 1,768 | — | 2nd round |
| 2014 | J3 | 3 | 12 | 8th | 33 | 10 | 4 | 19 | 38 | 57 | -19 | 34 | 1,773 | — | 2nd round |
| 2015 | J3 | 3 | 13 | 8th | 36 | 12 | 9 | 15 | 37 | 40 | -3 | 45 | 1,998 | — | 2nd round |
| 2016 | J3 | 3 | 16 | 4th | 30 | 14 | 8 | 8 | 37 | 26 | 11 | 50 | 2,425 | — | 2nd round |
| 2017 | J3 | 3 | 17 | 1st | 32 | 18 | 7 | 7 | 53 | 31 | 22 | 61 | 2,364 | — | 1st round |
| 2018 | J3 | 3 | 17 | 8th | 32 | 12 | 7 | 13 | 37 | 35 | 2 | 43 | 2,839 | — | 1st round |
| 2019 | J3 | 3 | 18 | 8th | 34 | 13 | 10 | 11 | 45 | 35 | 10 | 49 | 1,576 | — | 1st round |
| 2020 † | J3 | 3 | 18 | 1st | 34 | 21 | 10 | 3 | 55 | 18 | 37 | 73 | 1,221 | — | Semi Final |
| 2021 | J2 | 2 | 22 | 13th | 42 | 11 | 14 | 17 | 41 | 53 | -12 | 47 | 2,097 | — | 1st round |
| 2022 | J2 | 2 | 22 | 12nd | 42 | 15 | 11 | 16 | 39 | 46 | -7 | 56 | 2,283 | — | 2nd round |
| 2023 | J2 | 2 | 22 | 13th | 42 | 12 | 15 | 15 | 37 | 44 | -7 | 51 | 3,139 | — | 2nd round |
| 2024 | J2 | 2 | 20 | 10th | 38 | 15 | 9 | 14 | 36 | 35 | 1 | 54 | 4,128 | 3rd round | 2nd round |
| 2025 | J2 | 2 | 20 | 14th | 38 | 11 | 10 | 17 | 43 | 59 | -16 | 43 | 4,953 | 2nd round | 4th round |
| 2026 | J2 | 2 | 40 | 6th | 18 | 11 | 2 | 5 | 23 | 14 | 9 | 35 | 4,533 | N/A | N/A |
| 2026-27 | J2 | 2 | 20 | TBD | 38 | | | | | | | | | TBD | TBD |

Key

- Pos. = Position in league; P = Games played; W = Games won; D = Games drawn; L = Games lost; F = Goals scored; A = Goals conceded; GD = Goals difference; Pts = Points gained
- Attendance/G = Average home league attendance
- † 2020 season attendance reduced by COVID-19 worldwide pandemic
- Source: Source: J. League Data Site
