= J2/J3 100 Year Vision League =

Japan Professional Football League tournament

- Season: 2026
- Dates: 7 February – 7 June
- Champions: Vegalta Sendai
- Matches: 400
- Goals: 1,028 (2.57 per match)
- Top goalscorer: Shota Tamura (15 goals)
- Biggest home win: RB Ōmiya Ardija 6–0 Fukushima United (21 February 2026)
- Biggest away win: Nara Club 0–6 Tokushima Vortis (7 February 2026); Tokushima Vortis 0–6 Ehime FC (2 May 2026)
- Highest scoring: Thespa Gunma 7–2 SC Sagamihara (23 May 2026)
- Highest attendance: 20,454; Albirex Niigata 2–2 Kōchi United (7 March 2026)
- Lowest attendance: 1,060; Gainare Tottori 3–2 Reilac Shiga (13 May 2026)
- Total attendance: 2,266,699
- Average attendance: 5,667
- All statistics correct as of 7 June 2026 (UTC).

The J2/J3 100 Year Vision League, also known as the Meiji Yasuda J2/J3 100 Year Vision League (Japanese: 明治安田J2・J3百年構想リーグ), was a one-off football tournament organised by the Japan Professional Football League as part of the J.League 100 Year Vision League, held from 7 February to 7 June 2026. All 40 clubs from the J2 League and the J3 League participated.

== Overview ==
As the Japan Professional Football League (J.League) transitions to an "autumn-spring system" in 2026, the J.League 100 Year Vision League was a special tournament held during the transitional period. Meiji Yasuda Life, the league's title partner through the end of 2026, will also serve as the title partner of this tournament.

Although this tournament is a league competition organised by the J.League, there was no promotion or relegation based on the results of this tournament, including from the JFL.

== Format ==
=== Regional round (7 February – 24 May) ===
The 40 teams competing in the 2026–27 J2 League and J3 League were divided geographically into four divisions (East A, East B, West A, West B), consisting of 10 teams each. Each division played a double round-robin home and away format, for a total of 180 games. Clubs from the same prefecture were grouped together as much as possible. In addition, the number of clubs playing in snowy regions, where home games cannot be played in February and March was also taken into consideration.

=== Rules ===
- If the winners can not be decided within 90 minutes, a penalty shoot-out will be played to decide the winners. For this tournament, the usual points system is retained, but the winners of the shoot-out will receive an extra point.
- Depending on the results, the following points will be awarded:
  - Wins after 90 minutes: 3 points
  - Penalty shootout wins: 2 points
  - Losses in penalty shootout: 1 point
  - Losses after 90 minutes: 0 points

=== Playoff round (30 May – 7 June) ===
Teams with the same placement in each group in the regional round will compete in a single-round knockout format (not a home-and-away format) to determine the final rankings (for example, matches between first-placed teams will decide 1st–4th place overall, matches between second-placed teams will decide 5th–8th place overall etc.).

The first matches will be between "East A v East B" and "West A v West B" and will be held as home games for East A and West A respectively, based on the final standings of the 2025 season.

If the winner is not determined after 90 minutes, two 15-minute periods of extra time will be played; if the winner is still not decided after extra time, a penalty shoot-out will be played.

=== Prize money ===
There is a total prize pool of ¥625 million (US$5.69 million). The top three teams at the end of the tournament received prize money of ¥150 million (US$1.37 million) for the winners, ¥75 million (US$683,371.3) for runners-up, and ¥25 million (US$227,790.43) for third place. During the regional round, each point is worth ¥500,000 (US$4,555.81). All teams also received an additional distributed fee of ¥60 million (US$546,697.04) based on their competition ranking.

== Participating clubs ==
Locations of the 2026 J2/J3 100 Year Vision League clubs

The 40 clubs participating in the J2 League and J3 League in the 2026–27 season participated.

The group divisions were announced on 15 December 2025. The asterisk indicates a club that is located in a snowy area and therefore cannot play home games at certain times (a maximum of four clubs can be in one group).

=== East region ===
East A
Club	League	Location	Stadium	Capacity
Vanraure Hachinohe*	J2	Aomori Prefecture	Prifoods Stadium	5,124
Blaublitz Akita*	J2	Akita Prefecture	Soyu Stadium	18,156
Vegalta Sendai*	J2	Miyagi Prefecture	Yurtec Stadium Sendai	19,694
Montedio Yamagata*	J2	Yamagata Prefecture	ND Soft Stadium Yamagata	20,315
Tochigi SC	J3	Tochigi Prefecture	Kanseki Stadium Tochigi	25,244
Tochigi City	J2	Tochigi Prefecture	City Football Station	5,129
Thespa Gunma	J3	Gunma Prefecture	Shoda Shoyu Stadium Gunma	15,253
Yokohama FC	J2	Kanagawa Prefecture	Mitsuzawa Stadium	15,046
Shonan Bellmare	J2	Kanagawa Prefecture	Lemon Gas Stadium Hiratsuka	15,380
SC Sagamihara	J3	Kanagawa Prefecture	Sagamihara Gion Stadium	6,291

East B
Club	League	Prefecture	Stadium	Capacity
Hokkaido Consadole Sapporo*	J2	Hokkaido Prefecture	Sapporo Dome	41,484
Fukushima United*	J3	Fukushima Prefecture	Toho Stadium	6,464
Iwaki FC	J2	Fukushima Prefecture	Hawaiians Stadium Iwaki	5,066
RB Omiya Ardija	J2	Saitama Prefecture	NACK5 Stadium Omiya	15,491
Ventforet Kofu	J2	Yamanashi Prefecture	JIT Recycle Ink Stadium	15,853
Matsumoto Yamaga*	J3	Nagano Prefecture	Sunpro Alwin	20,396
AC Nagano Parceiro*	J3	Nagano Prefecture	Minami Nagano Sports Park Stadium	15,515
Júbilo Iwata	J2	Shizuoka Prefecture	Yamaha Stadium	15,165
Fujieda MYFC	J2	Shizuoka Prefecture	Fujieda Soccer Stadium	5,056
FC Gifu	J3	Gifu Prefecture	Gifu Nagaragawa Stadium	17,540

=== West region ===
West A
Club	League	Prefecture	Stadium	Capacity
Albirex Niigata*	J2	Niigata Prefecture	Denka Big Swan Stadium	42,300
Kataller Toyama*	J2	Toyama Prefecture	Toyama Stadium	25,251
Zweigen Kanazawa*	J3	Ishikawa Prefecture	Kanazawa Stadium	10,444
FC Osaka	J3	Osaka Prefecture	Hanazono Rugby Stadium	27,346
Nara Club	J3	Nara Prefecture	Rohto Field Nara	5,600
Kamatamare Sanuki	J3	Kagawa Prefecture	Pikara Stadium	22,338
Tokushima Vortis	J2	Tokushima Prefecture	Pocarisweat Stadium	17,924
Ehime FC	J3	Ehime Prefecture	Ningineer Stadium	20,983
FC Imabari	J2	Ehime Prefecture	ASICS Satoyama Stadium	5,316
Kōchi United	J3	Kōchi Prefecture	Kochi Haruno Athletic Stadium	25,000

West B
Club	League	Prefecture	Stadium	Capacity
Reilac Shiga	J3	Shiga Prefecture	Heiwado HATO Stadium	9,000
Gainare Tottori*	J3	Tottori Prefecture	Axis Bird Stadium	16,033
Renofa Yamaguchi	J3	Yamaguchi Prefecture	Ishin Me-Life Stadium	15,115
Giravanz Kitakyushu	J3	Fukuoka Prefecture	Mikuni World Stadium Kitakyushu	15,300
Sagan Tosu	J2	Saga Prefecture	Ekimae Real Estate Stadium	24,130
Roasso Kumamoto	J3	Kumamoto Prefecture	Egao Kenko Stadium	32,000
Oita Trinita	J2	Ōita Prefecture	Crasus Dome Oita	40,000
Tegevajaro Miyazaki	J2	Miyazaki Prefecture	Ichigo Miyazaki Shintomi Football Stadium	5,000
Kagoshima United	J3	Kagoshima Prefecture	Shiranami Stadium	19,934
FC Ryukyu	J3	Okinawa Prefecture	Okinawa Athletic Park Stadium	10,189

== Regional round ==
=== East region ===
==== East A ====
Pos	Team	Pld	W	PKW	PKL	L	GF	GA	GD	Pts	Qualification
1	Vegalta Sendai	18	11	5	0	2	32	15	+17	43	Finals
2	Blaublitz Akita	18	11	0	2	5	23	14	+9	35	5th–8th place playoff
3	Shonan Bellmare	18	8	3	1	6	25	19	+6	31	9th–12th place playoff
4	Yokohama FC	18	8	2	1	7	34	27	+7	29	13th–16th place playoff
5	SC Sagamihara	18	7	2	3	6	31	33	−2	28	17th–20th place playoff
6	Thespa Gunma	18	6	1	3	8	26	36	−10	23	21st–24th place playoff
7	Montedio Yamagata	18	6	2	0	10	20	25	−5	22	25th–28th place playoff
8	Tochigi City FC	18	5	2	2	9	20	33	−13	21	29th–32nd place playoff
9	Vanraure Hachinohe	18	4	2	4	8	15	19	−4	20	33rd–36th place playoff
10	Tochigi SC	18	4	1	4	9	23	28	−5	18	37th–40th place playoff

Source: JLeague.co, J.LEAGUE Data Site
Rules for classification: 1) Points; 2) Goal difference; 3) Goals scored; 4) Head-to-head.

Home \ Away	VAN	BLA	VEG	MON	TSC	TCI	THE	YOK	SHO	SAG
Vanraure Hachinohe	—	1–0	1–1 (4–5 p)	0–2	0–0 (3–2 p)	0–1	0–1	1–1 (2–4 p)	0–1	2–2 (4–5 p)
Blaublitz Akita	1–0	—	0–0 (10–11 p)	2–0	2–0	1–0	3–1	1–3	0–1	0–1
Vegalta Sendai	0–0 (5–4 p)	1–3	—	1–0	2–1	5–0	2–2 (8–7 p)	0–3	1–1 (4–2 p)	3–1
Montedio Yamagata	1–0	0–1	0–1	—	2–2 (5–4 p)	1–2	1–2	1–0	3–1	2–3
Tochigi SC	0–3	0–0 (4–3 p)	1–2	1–2	—	3–2	5–1	4–0	1–1 (2–4 p)	0–2
Tochigi City FC	2–4	0–1	1–4	3–0	2–1	—	1–1 (3–5 p)	2–2 (4–5 p)	1–3	0–0 (4–2 p)
Thespa Gunma	0–1	3–2	1–3	1–1 (5–6 p)	1–3	0–0 (2–4 p)	—	3–1	0–2	7–2
Yokohama FC	4–1	1–2	0–1	1–2	1–0	5–1	3–0	—	1–3	3–3 (1–3 p)
Shonan Bellmare	1–0	1–2	0–2	2–1	1–1 (6–5 p)	1–2	1–2	0–1	—	4–0
SC Sagamihara	1–1 (2–4 p)	1–2	0–3	2–1	4–0	1–0	5–0	2–4	1–1 (2–4 p)	—

Source: J.League
Legend: Blue = home team win; Yellow = draw; Red = away team win.

==== East B ====
Pos	Team	Pld	W	PKW	PKL	L	GF	GA	GD	Pts	Qualification
1	Ventforet Kofu	18	10	2	1	5	21	13	+8	35	Finals
2	Hokkaido Consadole Sapporo	18	9	2	0	7	26	22	+4	31	5th–8th place playoff
3	Iwaki FC	18	7	4	2	5	22	18	+4	31	9th–12th place playoff
4	RB Omiya Ardija	18	9	1	1	7	38	28	+10	30	13th–16th place playoff
5	Fujieda MYFC	18	6	3	6	3	21	17	+4	30	17th–20th place playoff
6	FC Gifu	18	8	1	2	7	24	26	−2	28	21st–24th place playoff
7	Matsumoto Yamaga	18	6	2	4	6	31	21	+10	26	25th–28th place playoff
8	Júbilo Iwata	18	5	4	2	7	16	23	−7	25	29th–32nd place playoff
9	Fukushima United FC	18	4	2	2	10	28	41	−13	18	33rd–36th place playoff
10	AC Nagano Parceiro	18	3	2	3	10	15	33	−18	16	37th–40th place playoff

Source: JLeague.co, J.LEAGUE Data Site
Rules for classification: 1) Points; 2) Goal difference; 3) Goals scored; 4) Head-to-head.

Home \ Away	HOK	FUK	IWA	OMI	VEN	MAT	NAG	JUB	FUJ	GIF
Hokkaido Consadole Sapporo	—	0–2	2–1	4–3	1–0	2–1	2–0	0–1	2–1	1–2
Fukushima United FC	0–3	—	2–3	1–2	0–1	1–3	4–2	4–2	3–3 (3–5 p)	1–2
Iwaki FC	1–0	3–1	—	1–1 (5–4 p)	0–1	1–1 (3–4 p)	1–0	1–0	1–2	0–1
RB Omiya Ardija	3–2	6–0	3–2	—	1–2	2–1	1–2	1–2	1–2	3–0
Ventforet Kofu	2–1	4–1	0–1	2–1	—	1–0	2–0	1–2	0–1	2–2 (4–3 p)
Matsumoto Yamaga	3–0	3–3 (2–4 p)	2–2 (4–5 p)	4–1	0–1	—	0–1	1–1 (5–6 p)	0–0 (1–4 p)	2–2 (5–4 p)
AC Nagano Parceiro	1–1 (4–5 p)	1–3	1–3	1–2	0–0 (5–4 p)	0–5	—	1–1 (1–4 p	0–0 (4–3 p)	2–3
Júbilo Iwata	0–1	0–0 (5–3 p)	1–1 (2–4 p)	1–4	1–0	1–2	0–0 (4–2 p)	—	0–3	1–0
Fujieda MYFC	1–1 (2–4 p)	1–1 (3–4 p)	0–0 (2–4 p)	1–1 (3–5 p)	1–1 (3–4 p)	2–0	0–2	1–1 (6–5 p)	—	0–2
FC Gifu	0–3	2–1	0–0 (5–4 p)	0–2	0–1	0–3	5–1	2–1	1–2	—

Source: J.League
Legend: Blue = home team win; Yellow = draw; Red = away team win.

=== West region ===
==== West A ====
Pos	Team	Pld	W	PKW	PKL	L	GF	GA	GD	Pts	Qualification
1	Kataller Toyama	18	10	3	2	3	37	24	+13	38	Finals
2	Albirex Niigata	18	9	3	2	4	21	17	+4	35	5th–8th place playoff
3	Tokushima Vortis	18	9	2	1	6	36	22	+14	32	9th–12th place playoff
4	Kōchi United SC	18	8	2	2	6	23	21	+2	30	13th–16th place playoff
5	Ehime FC	18	8	1	2	7	25	18	+7	28	17th–20th place playoff
6	Zweigen Kanazawa	18	5	5	2	6	15	21	−6	27	21st–24th place playoff
7	Nara Club	18	5	2	2	9	25	34	−9	21	25th–28th place playoff
8	FC Osaka	18	3	3	5	7	15	18	−3	20	29th–32nd place playoff
9	FC Imabari	18	5	1	3	9	14	18	−4	20	33rd–36th place playoff
10	Kamatamare Sanuki	18	5	1	2	10	14	32	−18	19	37th–40th place playoff

Source: JLeague.co, J.LEAGUE Data Site
Rules for classification: 1) Points; 2) Goal difference; 3) Goals scored; 4) Head-to-head.

Home \ Away	ALB	KAT	ZWE	OSA	NAR	KAM	VOR	EHI	IMA	KOC
Albirex Niigata	—	2–3	0–0 (4–1 p)	1–0	2–1	2–1	1–0	2–1	1–0	2–2 (3–4 p)
Kataller Toyama	2–0	—	0–2	0–0 (10–9 p)	5–2	1–1 (3–5 p)	2–2 (5–6 p)	2–2 (4–3 p)	1–1 (3–0 p)	4–0
Zweigen Kanazawa	1–1 (3–2 p)	0–1	—	0–0 (3–2 p)	1–0	1–0	0–4	0–2	0–0 (4–3 p	2–0
FC Osaka	0–0 (3–4 p)	1–2	1–1 (2–3 p)	—	2–0	0–1	2–2 (14–13 p)	0–1	1–2	2–2 (5–3 p)
Nara Club	0–0 (2–4 p)	5–1	5–1	1–3	—	1–1 (4–2 p)	0–6	2–2 (4–5 p)	1–0	0–0 (9–8 p)
Kamatamare Sanuki	0–3	1–5	0–1	2–2 (4–5 p)	3–1	—	0–5	1–0	1–0	0–3
Tokushima Vortis	4–0	1–3	2–1	1–0	1–2	1–0	—	0–6	1–1 (4–3 p)	3–0
Ehime FC	0–1	0–2	2–2 (3–4 p)	0–1	3–2	3–0	0–1	—	0–2	1–0
FC Imabari	0–2	1–2	0–0 (5–3 p)	2–0	1–2	1–2	2–1	0–1	—	1–0
Kōchi United SC	2–1	3–1	3–2	0–0 (4–2 p)	2–0	2–0	2–1	0–1	2–0	—

Source: J.League
Legend: Blue = home team win; Yellow = draw; Red = away team win.

==== West B ====
Pos	Team	Pld	W	PKW	PKL	L	GF	GA	GD	Pts	Qualification
1	Tegevajaro Miyazaki	18	15	0	2	1	35	11	+24	47	Finals
2	Kagoshima United FC	18	8	4	1	5	23	15	+8	33	5th–8th place playoff
3	Sagan Tosu	18	8	2	4	4	24	14	+10	32	9th–12th place playoff
4	Renofa Yamaguchi	18	7	3	2	6	24	22	+2	29	13th–16th place playoff
5	Roasso Kumamoto	18	8	1	1	8	20	20	0	27	17th–20th place playoff
6	Gainare Tottori	18	6	4	1	7	20	24	−4	27	21st–24th place playoff
7	Oita Trinita	18	6	1	2	9	18	18	0	22	25th–28th place playoff
8	Reilac Shiga FC	18	6	1	1	10	15	28	−13	21	29th–32nd place playoff
9	FC Ryukyu	18	2	4	3	9	13	25	−12	17	33rd–36th place playoff
10	Giravanz Kitakyushu	18	4	0	3	11	17	32	−15	15	37th–40th place playoff

Source: JLeague.co, J.LEAGUE Data Site
Rules for classification: 1) Points; 2) Goal difference; 3) Goals scored; 4) Head-to-head.

Home \ Away	REI	GAI	REN	GIR	SAG	ROA	OIT	TEG	KAG	RYU
Reilac Shiga FC	—	1–3	1–4	1–0	0–2	1–0	0–3	1–0	1–0	2–1
Gainare Tottori	3–2	—	4–1	1–1 (5–4 p)	0–2	0–2	0–0 (5–3 p)	0–1	0–0 (3–5 p)	0–0 (7–6 p)
Renofa Yamaguchi	2–1	0–0 (3–5 p)	—	0–1	2–0	1–1 (4–5 p)	3–1	0–1	2–1	2–0
Giravanz Kitakyushu	1–2	1–3	2–2 (7–8 p)	—	0–1	1–2	2–1	2–3	1–5	1–0
Sagan Tosu	2–0	4–0	1–1 (2–3 p)	1–0	—	1–1 (4–3 p)	0–1	1–1 (6–5 p)	0–1	2–2 (3–4 p)
Roasso Kumamoto	2–0	0–1	2–1	4–1	0–2	—	3–1	0–5	0–1	0–1
Oita Trinita	2–0	2–0	1–2	2–0	0–1	0–1	—	1–2	0–0 (5–4 p)	2–3
Tegevajaro Miyazaki	2–2 (1–4 p)	3–1	3–0	3–0	2–1	1–0	1–0	—	1–0	1–0
Kagoshima United FC	1–0	3–1	1–0	1–1 (8–7 p)	1–1 (11–10 p)	2–1	0–1	2–3	—	3–1
FC Ryukyu	0–0 (14–13 p)	1–3	1–1 (4–5 p)	0–2	2–2 (4–3 p)	0–1	0–0 (6–5 p)	0–2	1–1 (2–4 p)	—

Source: J.League
Legend: Blue = home team win; Yellow = draw; Red = away team win.

== Play-off round ==
=== Bracket ===
Finals

Round 1
30 May – Sendai
Vegalta Sendai	1
Ventforet Kofu	0
30 May – Nagano
Kataller Toyama	1
Tegevajaro Miyazaki	0

Round 2
6 June – Sendai
Vegalta Sendai (p)	1 (4)
Kataller Toyama	1 (2)
3rd/4th Ranking match
6 June – Miyazaki
Tegevajaro Miyazaki	2
Ventforet Kofu	1

5th–8th place playoff

Round 1
30 May – Akita
Blaublitz Akita (p)	1 (5)
Consadole Sapporo	1 (4)
30 May – Niigata
Albirex Niigata	0
Kagoshima United (a.e.t.)	1

Round 2
7 June – Akita
Blaublitz Akita	0
Kagoshima United	2
7th/8th Ranking match
6 June – Niigata
Albirex Niigata (p)	0 (5)
Consadole Sapporo	0 (4)

9th–12th place playoff

Round 1
30 May – Naruto
Tokushima Vortis	3
Sagan Tosu	1
30 May – Hiratsuka
Shonan Bellmare	1
Iwaki FC (a.e.t.)	2

Round 2
7 June – Naruto
Tokushima Vortis	2
Iwaki FC	0
11th/12th Ranking match
6 June – Saga
Sagan Tosu	1
Shonan Bellmare	0

13th–16th place playoff

Round 1
30 May – Yokohama
Yokohama FC	2
RB Omiya Ardija	1
30 May – Haruno
Kōchi United	2
Renofa Yamaguchi (a.e.t.)	3

Round 2
6 June – Yokohama
Yokohama FC	2
Renofa Yamaguchi	1
15th/16th Ranking match
6 June – Saitama
RB Omiya Ardija	2
Kōchi United	1

17th–20th place playoff

Round 1
30 May – Sagamihara
SC Sagamihara (a.e.t.)	4
Fujieda MYFC	3
30 May – Matsuyama
Ehime FC	0
Roasso Kumamoto	1

Round 2
6 June – Sagamihara
SC Sagamihara	3
Roasso Kumamoto	0
19th/20th Ranking match
6 June – Fujieda
Fujieda MYFC	1
Ehime FC	0

21st–24th place playoff

Round 1
31 May – Gunma
Thespa Gunma	0
FC Gifu	1
31 May – Kanazawa
Zweigen Kanazawa	1
Gainare Tottori	3

Round 2
6 June – Shizuoka
FC Gifu	1 (2)
Gainare Tottori (p)	1 (4)
23rd/24th Ranking match
7 June – Kanazawa
Zweigen Kanazawa	4
Thespa Gunma	1

25th–28th place playoff

Round 1
31 May – Yamagata
Montedio Yamagata	1
Matsumoto Yamaga	2
31 May – Nara
Nara Club (a.e.t.)	4
Oita Trinita	3

Round 2
6 June – Matsumoto
Matsumoto Yamaga	0
Nara Club	2
27th/28th Ranking match
7 June – Ōita
Oita Trinita	1
Montedio Yamagata	0

29th–32nd place playoff

Round 1
30 May – Tochigi
Tochigi City (p)	3 (3)
Júbilo Iwata	3 (1)
30 May – Osaka
FC Osaka	0
Reilac Shiga (a.e.t.)	1

Round 2
6 June – Tochigi
Tochigi City	3
Reilac Shiga	1
31st/32nd Ranking match
6 June – Iwata
Júbilo Iwata	2 (4)
FC Osaka (p)	2 (5)

33rd–36th place playoff

Round 1
1 June – Hachinohe
Vanraure Hachinohe	0
Fukushima United	1
31 May – Imabari
FC Imabari	1
FC Ryukyu	2

Round 2
7 June – Fukushima
Fukushima United (p)	1 (5)
FC Ryukyu	1 (4)
35th/36th Ranking match
7 June – Hachinohe
Vanraure Hachinohe	1 (3)
FC Imabari (p)	1 (5)

37th–40th place playoff

Round 1
31 May – Kagawa
Kamatamare Sanuki	3
Giravanz Kitakyushu	1
31 May – Tochigi
Tochigi SC	0 (3)
AC Nagano Parceiro (p)	0 (5)

Round 2
5 June – Kagawa
Kamatamare Sanuki	0 (3)
AC Nagano Parceiro (p)	0 (5)
39th/40th Ranking match
7 June – Tochigi
Tochigi SC	2
Giravanz Kitakyushu	1

=== Round 1 ===
==== Summary ====
Team 1	Score	Team 2
East Region
Vegalta Sendai	1–0	Ventforet Kofu
Blaublitz Akita (p)	1–1 (5–4)	Hokkaido Consadole Sapporo
Shonan Bellmare	1–2 (a.e.t.)	Iwaki FC
Yokohama FC	2–1	RB Omiya Ardija
SC Sagamihara	4–3 (a.e.t.)	Fujieda MYFC
Thespa Gunma	0–1	FC Gifu
Montedio Yamagata	1–2	Matsumoto Yamaga
Tochigi City (p)	3–3 (3–1)	Júbilo Iwata
Vanraure Hachinohe	0–1	Fukushima United
Tochigi SC	0–0 (3–5)	AC Nagano Parceiro (p)
West Region
Kataller Toyama	1–0	Tegevajaro Miyazaki
Albirex Niigata	0–1 (a.e.t.)	Kagoshima United
Tokushima Vortis	3–1	Sagan Tosu
Kōchi United	2–3 (a.e.t.)	Renofa Yamaguchi
Ehime FC	0–1	Roasso Kumamoto
Zweigen Kanazawa	1–3	Gainare Tottori
Nara Club	4–3 (a.e.t.)	Oita Trinita
FC Osaka	0–1 (a.e.t.)	Reilac Shiga
FC Imabari	1–2	FC Ryukyu
Kamatamare Sanuki	3–1	Giravanz Kitakyushu

==== Matches (East Region) ====
30 May 2026
14:03 JST

Vegalta Sendai	1–0	Ventforet Kofu
Sugata 55'	Report

Yurtec Stadium Sendai
Attendance: 12,720
Referee: Yoshimi Yamashita
31 May 2026
14:03 JST

Blaublitz Akita	1–1 (a.e.t.)	Hokkaido Consadole Sapporo
Nagai 65'	Report	Omori 48'
Penalties
Nishimura (penalty scored); Sagawa (penalty scored); Nakano (penalty scored); Mizutani (penalty scored); Morooka (penalty scored)	5–4	(penalty missed) Okada; (penalty scored) Arano; (penalty scored) Hasegawa; (penalty scored) Osaki; (penalty scored) Safo

Soyu Stadium
Attendance: 3,806
Referee: Keisuke Nobori
30 May 2026
14:03 JST

Shonan Bellmare	1–2 (a.e.t.)	Iwaki FC
Yamada 62'	Report	Nakajima 26'; Takahashi 96'

Lemon Gas Stadium Hiratsuka
Attendance: 7,629
Referee: Reo Tanaka
30 May 2026
14:03 JST

Yokohama FC	2–1	RB Omiya Ardija
Lukian 45+4'; Katō 59' (o.g.)	Report	Caprini 58'

NHK Spring Mitsuzawa Football Stadium
Attendance: 8,840
Referee: Yuki Tanabe
30 May 2026
14:03 JST

SC Sagamihara	4–3 (a.e.t.)	Fujieda MYFC
Sasaki 35'; Okita 96'; Muto 100' (pen.); Tokida 104'	Report	Kondo 17'; Kawamoto 91'; Seriu 116'

Sagamihara Gion Stadium
Attendance: 2,692
Referee: Genki Tawara
31 May 2026
14:03 JST

Thespa Gunma	0–1	FC Gifu
	Report	Mun 26'

Shoda Shoyu Stadium Gunma
Attendance: 2,276
Referee: Shuhei Shimizu
31 May 2026
14:03 JST

Montedio Yamagata	1–2 (a.e.t.)	Matsumoto Yamaga
Takahashi 66'	Report	Inoue 76'; Murakoshi 92'

ND Soft Stadium Yamagata
Attendance: 8,426
Referee: Takahito Seta
30 May 2026
14:03 JST

Tochigi City	3–3 (a.e.t.)	Júbilo Iwata
Moberg 36'; Saito 67'; Inui 112'	Report	Pedro Augusto 32' (o.g.); Tameda 59'; Matheus Peixoto 114' (pen.)
Penalties
Yoshida (penalty scored); Koike (penalty missed); Kato (penalty scored); Inui (penalty scored)	3–1	(penalty missed) Matheus Peixoto; (penalty scored) Sato; (penalty missed) Yoshimura; (penalty missed) Nishikubo

City Football Station
Attendance: 2,300
Referee: Toshihiro Nakai
1 June 2026
19:03 JST

Vanraure Hachinohe	0–1	Fukushima United
	Report	Shimizu 23'

Prifoods Stadium
Attendance: 1,896
Referee: Shuhei Ishimaru
31 May 2026
14:03 JST

Kamatamare Sanuki	3–1	Giravanz Kitakyushu
Lee Gi-san 34'; Goto 45+2'; Ishikura 73'	Report	Saitai 48'

Pikara Stadium
Attendance: 1,407
Referee: Masaki Tsuruoka

==== Matches (West Region) ====
30 May 2026
18:03 JST

Kataller Toyama	1–0	Tegevajaro Miyazaki
Furukawa 21'	Report

Minami Nagano Sports Park Stadium
Attendance: 3,842
Referee: Yuzo Sutani
30 May 2026
14:03 JST

Albirex Niigata	0–1 (a.e.t.)	Kagoshima United
	Report	Hirose 120'

Denka Big Swan Stadium
Attendance: 10,761
Referee: Yoshihito Hori
30 May 2026
14:03 JST

Tokushima Vortis	3–1	Sagan Tosu
Kajiya 41'; Sugimoto 47'; Miyazaki 76'	Report	Hyon 45+1'

Pocari Sweat Stadium
Attendance: 3,394
Referee: Shinya Sasaki
30 May 2026
14:03 JST

Kōchi United	2–3 (a.e.t.)	Renofa Yamaguchi
Kanehara 51', 76' (red card) 116'	Report	Yamamoto 6', 29'; Kobayashi 106'

Kochi Haruno Athletic Stadium
Attendance: 2,131
Referee: Kohei Yano
30 May 2026
16:03 JST

Ehime FC	0–1	Roasso Kumamoto
	Report	Katori 62'

Ningineer Stadium
Attendance: 3,078
Referee: Michiaki Kitazawa
31 May 2026
14:03 JST

Zweigen Kanazawa	1–3	Gainare Tottori
Sugiura 75'	Report	Yajima 2'; Hoshi 60'; Ozawa 87'

Kanazawa Go Go Curry Stadium
Attendance: 2,923
Referee: Naoto Uehara
30 May 2026
14:03 JST

Nara Club	4–3 (a.e.t.)	Oita Trinita
Tamura 60'; Mochizuki 85', 100'; Morita 89'	Report	Arima 18'; Kim Hyun-woo 28'; Yoshida 44'

Rohto Field Nara
Attendance: 1,149
Referee: Ryo Munakata
30 May 2026
14:03 JST

FC Osaka	0–1 (a.e.t.)	Reilac Shiga
	Report	Suzuki 102' (pen.)

Hanazono Rugby Stadium
Attendance: 1,874
Referee: Kentaro Kobayashi
31 May 2026
14:03 JST

FC Imabari	1–2	FC Ryukyu
Maruyama 3'	Report	Ihori 61'; Suzuki 75'

ASICS Satoyama Stadium
Attendance: 4,275
Referee: Tetsuro Yoshida
31 May 2026
14:03 JST

Kamatamare Sanuki	3–1	Giravanz Kitakyushu
Lee Gi-san 34'; Goto 45+2'; Ishikura 73'	Report	Saitai 61'

Pikara Stadium
Attendance: 1,407
Referee: Masaki Tsuruoka

=== Round 2 ===
==== Summary ====
For these matchups, the team with the better regional round's records will host the match.

Team 1	Score	Team 2
Winner decision matches
Vegalta Sendai (p)	1–1 (4–2)	Kataller Toyama
Blaublitz Akita	0–2	Kagoshima United
Tokushima Vortis	2–0	Iwaki FC
Yokohama FC	2–1	Renofa Yamaguchi
SC Sagamihara	3–0	Roasso Kumamoto
FC Gifu	1–1 (2–4)	Gainare Tottori (p)
Matsumoto Yamaga	0–2	Nara Club
Tochigi City	3–1	Reilac Shiga
Fukushima United (p)	1–1 (5–4)	FC Ryukyu
Kamatamare Sanuki	0–0 (3–5)	AC Nagano Parceiro (p)
Ranking decision matches
Tegevajaro Miyazaki	2–1	Ventforet Kofu
Albirex Niigata (p)	0–0 (5–4)	Consadole Sapporo
Sagan Tosu	1–0	Shonan Bellmare
RB Omiya Ardija	2–1	Kōchi United
Fujieda MYFC	1–0	Ehime FC
Zweigen Kanazawa	4–1	Thespa Gunma
Oita Trinita	1–0	Montedio Yamagata
Júbilo Iwata	2–2 (4–5)	FC Osaka (p)
Vanraure Hachinohe	1–1 (3–5)	FC Imabari (p)
Tochigi SC	2–1 (a.e.t.)	Giravanz Kitakyushu

==== Matches ====
1st/2nd place

6 June 2026
14:03 JST

Vegalta Sendai	1–1 (a.e.t.)	Kataller Toyama
Nakada 30'	Report	Jung Woo-young (red card) 41'; Fukuzawa 90+4'
Penalties
Sugata (penalty scored); Yasuno (penalty missed); Igarashi (penalty scored); Furuya (penalty scored); Minami (penalty scored)	4–2	(penalty scored) Tsuboi; (penalty scored) Fuseya; (penalty missed) Matsuoka; (penalty missed) Saneto

Yurtec Stadium Sendai
Attendance: 16,656
Referee: Yusuke Ohashi

3rd/4th place

6 June 2026
14:03 JST

Tegevajaro Miyazaki	2–1	Ventforet Kofu
Toshida 53'; Matsumoto 87'	Report	Fujii 68'

Ichigo Miyazaki Shintomi Football Stadium
Attendance: 2,343
Referee: Yoshihito Hori

5th/6th place

7 June 2026
14:03 JST

Blaublitz Akita	0–2	Kagoshima United
	Report	Kawamura 30'; Saga 42'

Soyu Stadium
Attendance: 3,322
Referee: Hayato Shimizu

7th/8th place

6 June 2026
14:03 JST

Albirex Niigata	0–0 (a.e.t.)	Hokkaido Consadole Sapporo
	Report
Penalties
Fujiwara (penalty scored); Shirai (penalty missed); Shimabuku (penalty scored); Otake (penalty scored); Okumura (penalty scored); Mori (penalty scored)	5–4	(penalty scored) Supachok; (penalty scored) Osaki; (penalty scored) Sato; (penalty missed) Safo; (penalty scored) Hasegawa; (penalty missed) Okada

Denka Big Swan Stadium
Attendance: 7,963
Referee: Takahito Seta

9th/10th place

7 June 2026
13:08 JST

Tokushima Vortis	2–0	Iwaki FC
Yamada 4'; Kajiya 69'	Report

Pocari Sweat Stadium
Attendance: 2,486
Referee: Yuki Tanabe

11th/12th place

6 June 2026
19:03 JST

Sagan Tosu	1–0	Shonan Bellmare
Sakamoto 88'	Report

Ekimae Real Estate Stadium
Attendance: 5,427
Referee: Kentaro Kobayashi

13th/14th place

6 June 2026
14:03 JST

Yokohama FC	2–1	Renofa Yamaguchi
João Paulo 13'; Komazawa 90'	Report	Ichikawa 56' (o.g.)

NHK Spring Mitsuzawa Football Stadium
Attendance: 3,646
Referee: Shinya Sasaki

15th/16th place

6 June 2026
14:03 JST

RB Omiya Ardija	2–1	Kōchi United SC
Gabriel 73'; Ishikawa 81'	Report	Kozuki 55'

NACK5 Stadium Omiya
Attendance: 5,727
Referee: Fumiya Honda

17th/18th place

6 June 2026
14:03 JST

SC Sagamihara	3–0	Roasso Kumamoto
Nakayama 44', 55'; Sugimoto 58'	Report

Sagamihara Gion Stadium
Attendance: 2,244
Referee: Tatsuya Sakai

19th/20th place

6 June 2026
14:03 JST

Fujieda MYFC	1–0	Ehime FC
Okazawa 37'	Report

Fujieda Soccer Stadium
Attendance: 2,531
Referee: Shuhei Shimizu

21st/22nd place

6 June 2026
15:03 JST

FC Gifu	1–1 (a.e.t.)	Gainare Tottori
Kawamoto 49'	Report	Miki 81'
Penalties
Fábio Azevedo (penalty scored); Hakozaki (penalty missed); Oiji (penalty missed); Kita (penalty scored)	2–4	(penalty scored) Fujita; (penalty scored) Shinoda; (penalty scored) Kawamura; (penalty scored) Tojo

IAI Stadium Nihondaira
Attendance: 1,327
Referee: Ryo Munakata

23rd/24th place

7 June 2026
14:03 JST

Zweigen Kanazawa	4–1	Thespa Gunma
Shirawachi 53', 90+2'; Buwanika 57'; Matsumoto 70'	Report	Nakashima 48'

Kanazawa Go Go Curry Stadium
Attendance: 2,397
Referee: Yosuke Kubota

25th/26th place

6 June 2026
14:03 JST

Matsumoto Yamaga	0–2	Nara Club
	Report	Tamura 11'; Kawasaki 31'

Sunpro Alwin
Attendance: 5,475
Referee: Takao Ueda

27th/28th place

7 June 2026
16:03 JST

Oita Trinita	1–0	Montedio Yamagata
Kim Hyun-woo 54'	Report	Sakamoto (red card) 85'

Crasus Dome Oita
Attendance: 3,629
Referee: Shungo Kikuchi

29th/30th place

6 June 2026
14:03 JST

Tochigi City	3–1	Reilac Shiga
Saito 42'; Yamashita 71'; Tanaka 83'	Report	Shiraishi 58'

City Football Station
Attendance: 1,921
Referee: Hiromichi Oka

31st/32nd place

6 June 2026
16:03 JST

Júbilo Iwata	2–2 (a.e.t.)	FC Osaka
Tameda 59'; Ishizuka 109'	Report	Kubo 79'; Tachino 120+2'
Penalties
Sato (penalty scored); Tameda (penalty missed); Kato (penalty scored); Uemura (penalty scored); Sumi (penalty scored)	4–5	(penalty scored) Kawakami; (penalty scored) Sumida; (penalty scored) Toya; (penalty scored) Morimura; (penalty scored) Tachino

Yamaha Stadium
Attendance: 3,485
Referee: Michiaki Kitazawa

33rd/34th place

7 June 2026
14:03 JST

Fukushima United	1–1 (a.e.t.)	FC Ryukyu
Higuchi 90' (pen.)	Report	Asakawa 36'
Penalties
Uehata (penalty missed); Harigaya (penalty scored); Einaga (penalty scored); Fujita (penalty scored); Okada (penalty scored); Nakamura (penalty scored)	5–4	(penalty missed) Takagi; (penalty scored) Motegi; (penalty scored) Ueno; (penalty scored) Suzuki; (penalty scored) Kikuchi; (penalty missed) Funabashi

Toho Stadium
Attendance: 1,243
Referee: Yuta Oha

35th/36th place

7 June 2026
13:03 JST

Vanraure Hachinohe	1–1 (a.e.t.)	FC Imabari
Sawada 87'	Report	Edigar Junio 45'; Gabriel Gomes (red card) 81'
Penalties
Kaburaki (penalty scored); Unoki (penalty scored); Takao (penalty missed); Sato (penalty scored)	3–5	(penalty scored) Komai; (penalty scored) Furuyama; (penalty scored) Sasa; (penalty scored) Kubo; (penalty scored) Sato

Prifoods Stadium
Attendance: 1,078
Referee: Shu Kawamata

37th/38th place

5 June 2026
19:03 JST

Kamatamare Sanuki	0–0 (a.e.t.)	AC Nagano Parceiro
Ueno (red card) 83'	Report
Penalties
Eguci (penalty scored); Woo Sang-ho (penalty scored); Ono (penalty missed); Kawakami (penalty scored)	3–5	(penalty scored) Shin; (penalty scored) Kutsuna; (penalty scored) Yoshida; (penalty scored) Hasegawa; (penalty scored) Tsukegi

Pikara Stadium
Attendance: 1,132
Referee: Toshihiro Nakai

39th/40th place

7 June 2026
14:03 JST

Tochigi SC	2–1 (a.e.t.)	Giravanz Kitakyushu
Kondo 60'; Nagai 97'	Report	Watanabe 39'

Kanseki Stadium Tochigi
Attendance: 2,179
Referee: Shuhei Ishimaru

== Final standings ==
Pos.	Team	Pos.	Team
1	Vegalta Sendai	21	Gainare Tottori
2	Kataller Toyama	22	FC Gifu
3	Tegevajaro Miyazaki	23	Zweigen Kanazawa
4	Ventforet Kofu	24	Thespa Gunma
5	Kagoshima United	25	Nara Club
6	Blaublitz Akita	26	Matsumoto Yamaga
7	Albirex Niigata	27	Oita Trinita
8	Consadole Sapporo	28	Montedio Yamagata
9	Tokushima Vortis	29	Tochigi City
10	Iwaki FC	30	Reilac Shiga
11	Sagan Tosu	31	FC Osaka
12	Shonan Bellmare	32	Júbilo Iwata
13	Yokohama FC	33	Fukushima United
14	Renofa Yamaguchi	34	FC Ryukyu
15	RB Omiya Ardija	35	FC Imabari
16	Kōchi United	36	Vanraure Hachinohe
17	SC Sagamihara	37	AC Nagano Parceiro
18	Roasso Kumamoto	38	Kamatamare Sanuki
19	Fujieda MYFC	39	Tochigi SC
20	Ehime FC	40	Giravanz Kitakyushu

== Season statistics ==
=== Top scorers ===
Rank	Player	Club	Goals
1	(Japan) Shota Tamura	Nara Club	15
2	(Japan) Toya Izumi	RB Omiya Ardija	10
2	(Japan) Ota Yamamoto	RB Omiya Ardija	10
2	(Brazil) Lucas Barcellos	Tokushima Vortis	10
5	(Japan) Yusei Toshida	Tegevajaro Miyazaki	9
6	(Brazil) Caprini	RB Omiya Ardija	8
6	(Japan) Hiroto Yamada	Shonan Bellmare	8
6	(Japan) Riyo Kawamoto	FC Gifu	8
9	(Japan) Taika Nakashima	Thespa Gunma	7
9	(Brazil) João Paulo	Yokohama FC	7
9	(Japan) Ren Sugimoto	SC Sagamihara	7
9	(Japan) Yuya Taguchi	Ehime FC	7

== Awards ==
=== Monthly MVP ===
Month	Region	Player	Pos.	Club	Ref.
February	East A	(Japan) Ryoma Kida	MF	Montedio Yamagata	
February	East B	(Japan) Riyo Kawamoto	FW	FC Gifu	
February	West A	(Brazil) Lucas Barcellos	FW	Tokushima Vortis	
February	West B	(Japan) Eisuke Watanabe	MF	Tegevajaro Miyazaki	
March	East A	(Brazil) Arthur Silva	MF	Shonan Bellmare	
March	East B	(Japan) Itsuki Oda	DF	Matsumoto Yamaga	
March	West A	(Brazil) Lucas Barcellos (2)	FW	Tokushima Vortis	
March	West B	(Japan) Yuto Yamada	DF	Kagoshima United	
April	East A	(Japan) Hiromi Kamada	MF	Vegalta Sendai	
April	East B	(Brazil) Gustavo Silva	MF	Júbilo Iwata	
April	West A	(Japan) Shunsuke Tanimoto	MF	Kataller Toyama	
April	West B	(Japan) Yota Shimokawa	DF	Tegevajaro Miyazaki	
May	East A	(Japan) Hayato Sugita	DF	Yokohama FC	
May	East B	(Japan) Takuma Arano	MF	Hokkaido Consadole Sapporo	
May	West A	(Japan) Shota Tamura	FW	Nara Club	
May	West B	(Japan) Ryo Arita	FW	Kagoshima United	

=== Goal of the Month ===
Month	Region	Player	Pos.	Club	Ref.
February	East A	(Japan) Ayumu Furuya	FW	Vegalta Sendai	
February	East B	(Japan) Kaiga Murakoshi	MF	Matsumoto Yamaga	
February	West A	(Japan) Ayumu Kameda	MF	Kataller Toyama	
February	West B	(Japan) Hiroshi Kiyotake	MF	Oita Trinita	
March	East A	(Japan) Shusuke Ota	FW	Shonan Bellmare	
March	East B	(Japan) Kosuke Fujieda	FW	Matsumoto Yamaga	
March	West A	(South Korea) Kim Tae-won	FW	Kataller Toyama	
March	West B	(Japan) Kanta Jojo	MF	Sagan Tosu	
April	East A	(Japan) Yugo Masukake	FW	Tochigi City	
April	East B	(Japan) Ryunosuke Ota	FW	Ventforet Kofu	
April	West A	(Japan) Atsushi Kawata	FW	Kōchi United	
April	West B	(Japan) Shinya Utsumoto	FW	Oita Trinita	
May	East A	(Japan) Kyo Hosoi	DF	Yokohama FC	
May	East B	(Ghana) Kinglord Safo	FW	Hokkaido Consadole Sapporo	
May	West A	(Japan) Ryosuke Maeda	MF	Ehime FC	
May	West B	(Japan) Daichi Suzuki	FW	Sagan Tosu	

=== Young Player of the Month ===
Month	Region	Player	Pos.	Club	Ref.
February	East A	(Japan) Ayumu Furuya	FW	Vegalta Sendai	
February	East B	(Japan) Shuto Nagano	DF	Fujieda MYFC	
February	West A	(Japan) Rei Umeki	DF	FC Imabari	
February	West B	(Japan) Kaito Konomi	MF	Giravanz Kitakyushu	
March	East A	(Japan) Sena Ishibashi	MF	Shonan Bellmare	
March	East B	(Japan) Mohamad Sadiki Wade	FW	FC Gifu	
March	West A	(Japan) Yuto Kunitake	MF	Nara Club	
March	West B	(Japan) Toa Suenaga	FW	Renofa Yamaguchi	
April	East A	(Japan) Ryosuke Iwasaki	MF	Yokohama FC	
April	East B	(Japan) Shota Kofie	MF	Iwaki FC	
April	West A	(Japan) Ayumu Kameda	MF	Kataller Toyama	
April	West B	(Japan) Daichi Suzuki	FW	Sagan Tosu	
May	East A	(Japan) Rikiru Nakano	DF	Thespa Gunma	
May	East B	(Japan) Kaito Tsuchiya	DF	Fukushima United	
May	West A	(Japan) Shuta Sasa	MF	FC Imabari	
May	West B	(Japan) Riku Izawa	MF	Sagan Tosu	

=== Save of the Month ===
Month	Region	Player	Club	Ref.
February	East A	(Japan) Naoto Kamifukumoto	Shonan Bellmare	
February	East B	(Japan) Tomoki Tagawa	Hokkaido Consadole Sapporo	
February	West A	(Dominican Republic) Noam Baumann	Albirex Niigata	
February	West B	(United States) Anton Burns	Gainare Tottori	
March	East A	(Japan) Genki Yamada	Blaublitz Akita	
March	East B	(Japan) Tomoki Ueda	Fukushima United	
March	West A	(Dominican Republic) Noam Baumann (2)	Albirex Niigata	
March	West B	(Japan) Hiroki Fujiharu (DF)	FC Ryukyu	
April	East A	(Japan) Kota Sanada	Shonan Bellmare	
April	East B	(Japan) Taiki Miyabe (DF)	Matsumoto Yamaga	
April	West A	(Japan) Toshiki Hirao	Kataller Toyama	
April	West B	(Japan) Koki Kawasahima	FC Ryukyu	
May	East A	(South Korea) Kim Min-ho	SC Sagamihara	
May	East B	(Japan) Tomoki Tagawa	Hokkaido Consadole Sapporo	
May	West A	(Japan) Yudai Murata	Kōchi United	
May	West B	(Japan) Shibuki Sato	Roasso Kumamoto	

== See also ==
- J1 100 Year Vision League
- 2026 JFL Cup
