= Keita Saitō =

Japanese footballer

Keita Saitō 齋藤 恵太

Personal information
- Full name: Keita Saitō
- Date of birth: March 31, 1993 (age 33)
- Place of birth: Yamamoto, Miyagi, Japan
- Height: 1.80 m (5 ft 11 in)
- Position: Forward

Team information
- Current team: Schwarz-Weiß Bregenz
- Number: 6

Youth career
- 1999–2004: Yamashita JFC
- 2005–2007: Yamashita Junior High School
- 2008–2010: Seiwa Gakuen High School

College career
Years	Team	Apps	(Gls)
2011–2014	Sendai University		

Senior career*
Years	Team	Apps	(Gls)
2015	Fukushima United FC	28	(8)
2016–2017	Roasso Kumamoto	37	(4)
2017–2019	Mito HollyHock	22	(1)
2019	→ Nagano Parceiro (loan)	17	(1)
2020–2024	Blaublitz Akita	130	(15)
2024–2025	Fagiano Okayama	21	(1)
2025	→ Tochigi City (loan)	15	(0)
2026	Tochigi City	3	(1)
- * Club domestic league appearances and goals

Keita Saitō (齋藤 恵太, Saitō Keita; born March 31, 1993 in Miyagi) is a Japanese professional football player.

== Early life ==
Whilst at Yamashita Junior High School, the coach of the football team rarely came to coach, so Saitō made the practice menu and provided attacking and defensive coaching for his team.

== Career ==
Saitō joined J3 League club Fukushima United FC in 2015. On 8 November 2015, he netted a hat-trick, the first of his career, in a 3–0 win over J.League U-22 Selection.

On 18 December 2015, he moved to J2 League club Roasso Kumamoto. He scored on his league debut against Tokushima Vortis on 6 March 2016, scoring in the 83rd minute.

On 13 July 2019, Saitō joined AC Nagano Parceiro on loan.

On 8 January 2020, Saitō was announced at Blaublitz Akita. On 17 April 2023, the club announced he was diagnosed with a right hamstring strain and would be out for the next 12 weeks. On 28 June 2023, Saitō scored against Shimizu S-Pulse in the 49th minute, which was Blaublitz Akita's 400th goal in the J League.

On 20 December 2023, Saitō was announced at Fagiano Okayama. He made his league debut against Tochigi SC on 25 February 2024. Saitō scored his first league goal against Ehime on 7 April 2024, scoring in the 92nd minute.

== Club statistics ==
As of 8 April 2026

Appearances and goals by club, season and competition
Club	Season	League			National cup (Note: Includes Emperors Cup)		League cup (Note: Includes J.League Cup)		Total	
Club	Season	Division	Apps	Goals	Apps	Goals	Apps	Goals	Apps	Goals
Fukushima United	2015	J3 League	28	8	1	0	–		29	8
Roasso Kumamoto	2016	J2 League	25	2	0	0	–		25	2
Roasso Kumamoto	2017	J2 League	12	2	1	0	–		13	2
Roasso Kumamoto	Total		37	4	1	0	0	0	38	4
Mito HollyHock	2017	J2 League	12	1	0	0	–		12	1
Mito HollyHock	2018	J2 League	9	0	1	0	–		10	0
Mito HollyHock	2019	J2 League	1	0	1	0	–		2	0
Mito HollyHock	Total		22	1	2	0	0	0	24	1
AC Nagano Parceiro (loan)	2019	J3 League	17	1	0	0	–		17	1
Blaublitz Akita	2020	J3 League	24	3	0	0	–		24	3
Blaublitz Akita	2021	J2 League	41	4	0	0	–		41	4
Blaublitz Akita	2022	J2 League	38	3	0	0	–		38	3
Blaublitz Akita	2023	J2 League	27	5	0	0	–		27	5
Blaublitz Akita	Total		130	15	0	0	0	0	130	15
Fagiano Okayama	2024	J2 League	20	1	1	0	1	0	22	1
Fagiano Okayama	2025	J1 League	1	0	0	0	0	0	1	0
Fagiano Okayama	Total		21	1	1	0	1	0	23	1
Tochigi City (loan)	2025	J3 League	15	0	0	0	0	0	15	0
Tochigi City	2026	J2/J3 (100)	3	1	–		–		3	1
Career total			273	31	5	0	1	0	279	31

== Honours ==
Blaublitz Akita

- J3 League (1): 2020
