= Junya Suzuki =

Junya Suzuki may refer to:

- Junya Suzuki (footballer, born January 1996) (鈴木 準弥), Japanese footballer
- Junya Suzuki (footballer, born May 1996) (鈴木 順也), Japanese footballer
