= City Football Station =

Football stadium, home of Tochigi City

- シティ フットボール ステーション
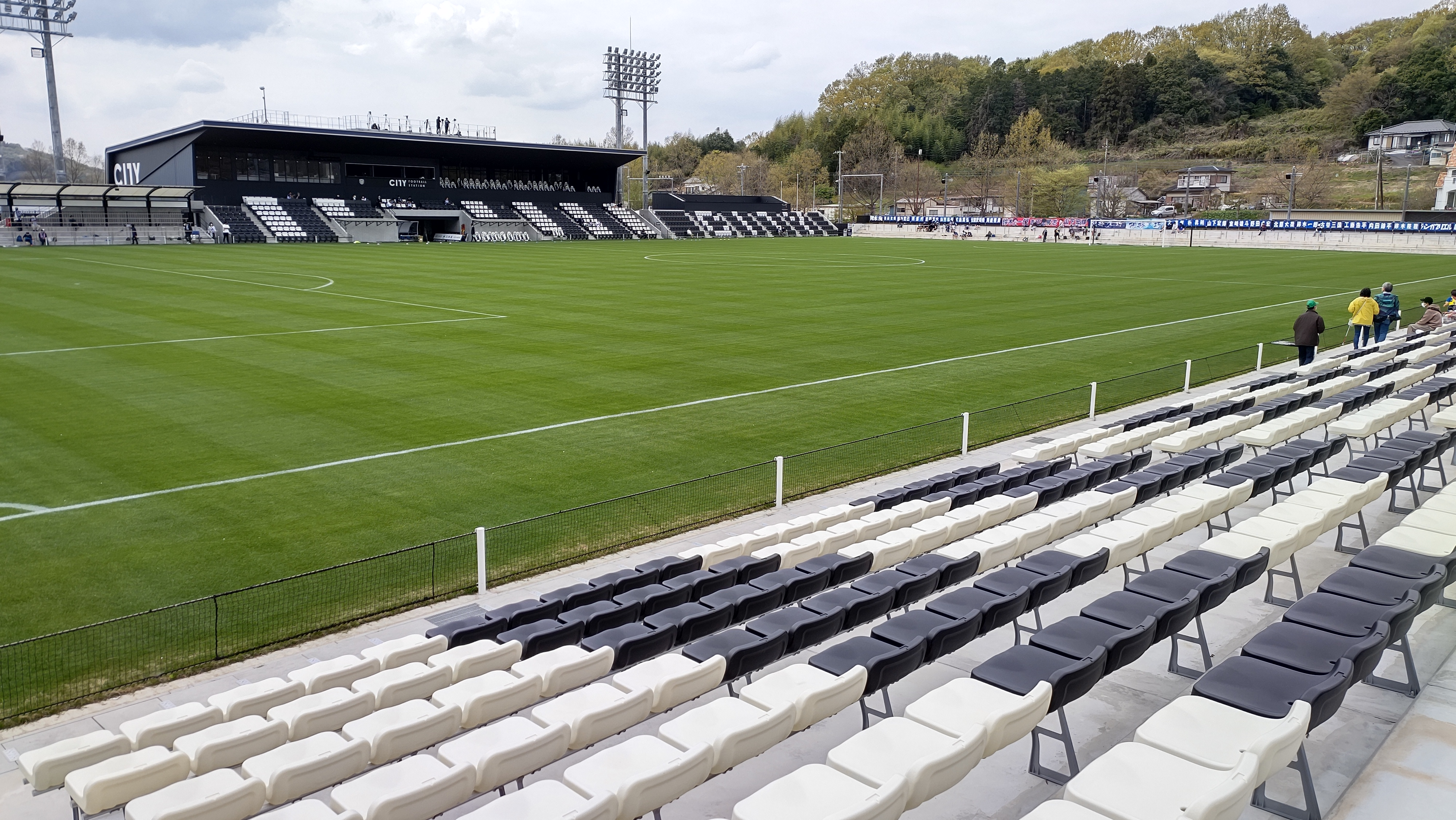
- View of the main stand
- Interactive map of City Football Station
- Full name: City Football Station
- Address: 1038-1 Mitani, Iwafume-cho, Tochigi City, Tochigi Prefecture
- Location: Iwafune, Tochigi, Japan
- Coordinates: 36°20′15″N 139°38′43″E
- Owner: Nippon Rika Industries Corporation
- Operator: The Tochigi City United
- Seating type: Stadium seating
- Capacity: 5,085
- Type: Stadium
- Event: Sporting events
- Surface: Grass
- Record attendance: 4,581 (Tochigi City–AC Nagano Parceiro, 23 November 2025)
- Public transit: JR East: Ryōmō Line at Iwafune Station

Construction
- Built: March 2020–March 2021
- Opened: March 2021
- Cost: Approx. ¥1.7 billion (US$10.74 million)
- Main contractor: Obayashi Corporation

Tenant
- Tochigi City

City Football Station (シティ フットボール ステーション) is a football stadium in Tochigi, Japan, which has a seating capacity of 5,085. It has been the home of Tochigi City since 2021.

== History ==
On 3 December 2018, Takashi Oguri, president of Tochigi City FC (formerly Tochigi Uva FC), presented a formal request letter to Tochigi City Mayor Hideko Ōkawa outlining the club's ambitions for a new stadium. The proposals included the construction of a football-specific stadium open to the local community, an adjacent natural grass training pitch, player and staff accommodation, and a food and beverage mall. The club also requested financial support through public grants and subsidies, and sought cooperation from the city in areas including personnel development and staffing. The requests were broadly tied to the club's ambition to join the J.League, with the city's cooperation in securing land for the stadium considered a key part of achieving this goal, as J.League regulations require clubs to have a dedicated stadium with a minimum capacity of 5,000 seats.

The club identified Iwafune Athletic Park in Tochigi City as its preferred site for the new stadium, with the planned construction area located in the western part of the park, requiring the demolition of existing paid public facilities on the site, including a baseball stadium, athletics stadium, and football pitch. A public information session was held on 13 January 2020, at which the club revealed initial imagery of the proposed stadium. The design was handled by Plantec General Planning Office, with Obayashi Corporation subsequently selected as the contractor. Construction was planned to begin by the end of the fiscal year, with completion targeted for October 2020. Construction costs, estimated at between one and 1.5 billion yen, were to be fully funded by Nippon Rika Kogyosho, the club's largest sponsor and a company also presided over by club president Takashi Ōkuri. The city of Tochigi indicated it would not contribute to construction costs, but was considering making the site available to the club free of charge in order to support local regeneration.

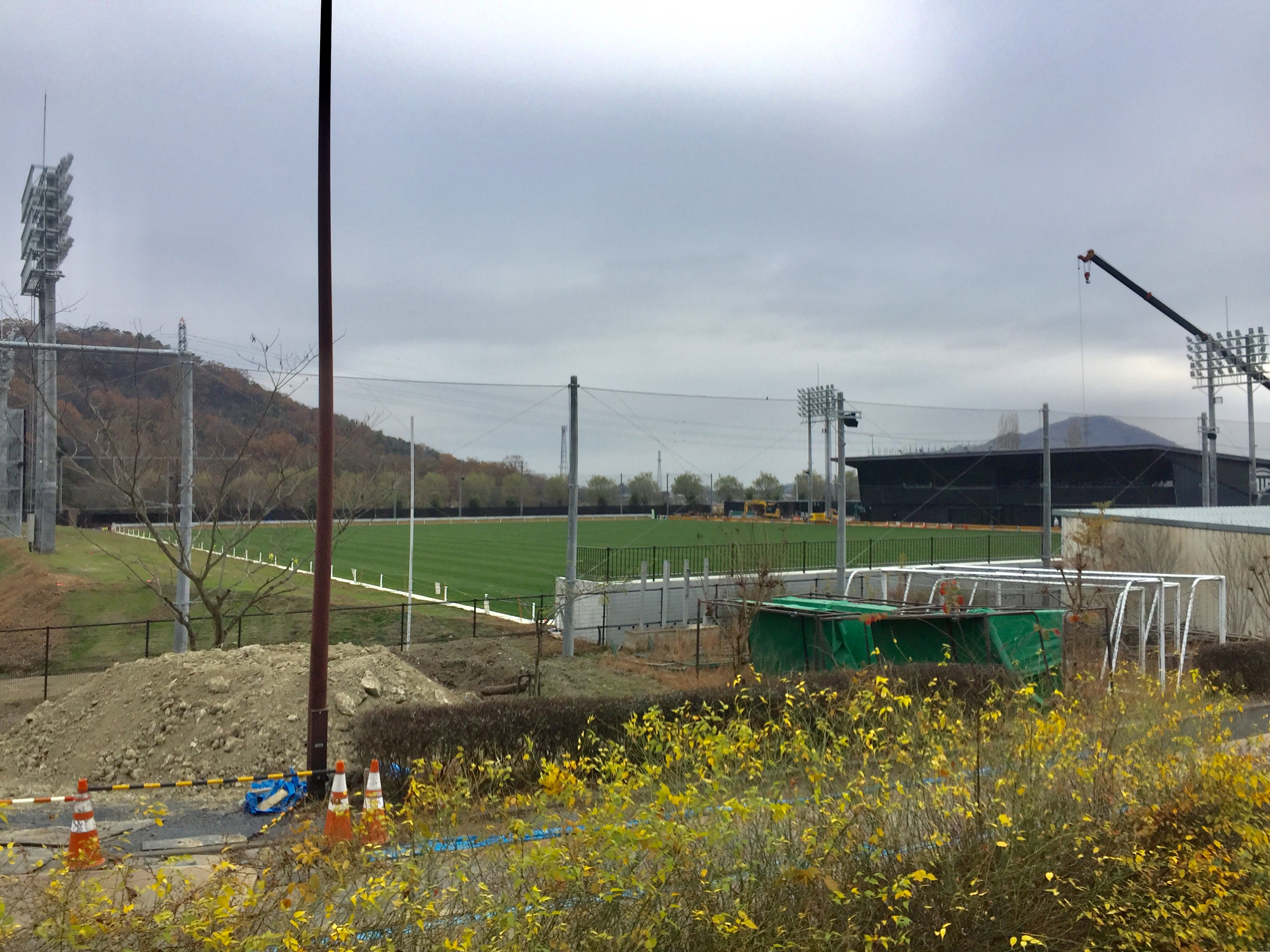
Stadium under construction in December 2020

Although construction continued into 2021, the first match was scheduled to be played on 14 March of that year. Tochigi City won the training match 2–0 against Mito HollyHock in front of a small, members-only crowd due to COVID-19 restrictions still being in place. The first league game played was a 2–1 defeat to Esperanza SC in the Kantō Regional League.

In July 2025, during Tochigi City's first season in the J.League, a roof was installed behind the home goal. At the J.League Board of Directors meeting on 25 September, the club was granted a J2 club licence for the J2/J3 100 Year Vision League. Although the stadium does not fully meet J2 standards in terms of capacity and roof coverage, an exception to the facility requirements was applied on the basis that the capacity satisfies the J.League's "ideal stadium" criteria. The stadium currently does not meet the requirement for all spectator seats to be covered, though the club has committed to addressing this through staged renovations over a five-year grace period.

== Structure and facilities ==
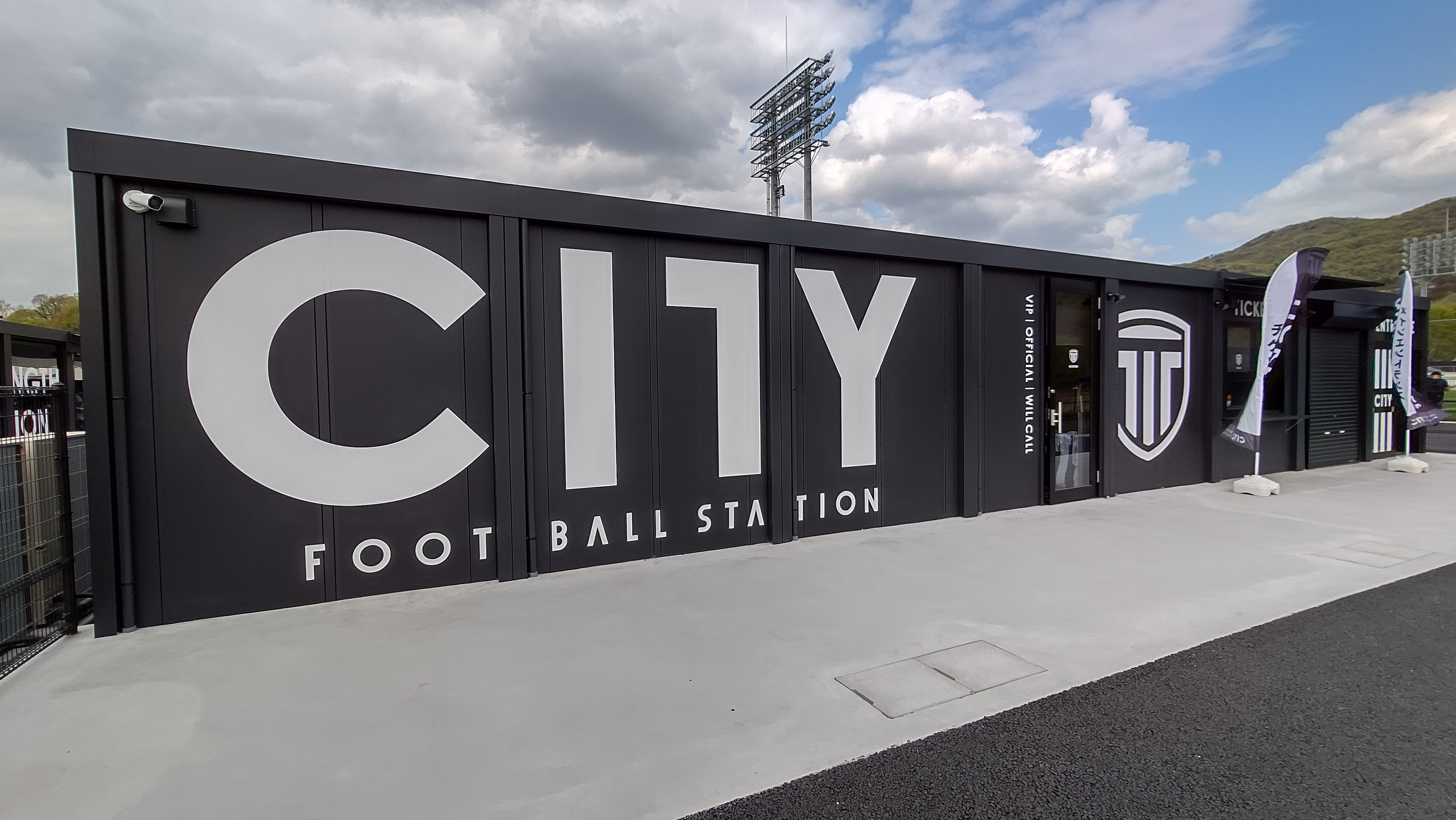
Club shop at City Football Station

City Football Station is equipped with four floodlight towers and has a capacity of 5,085. A notable design feature is the distance of just five metres between the pitch and the nearest spectator seating. The main stand features backrest seating throughout and a roof covering its central section, while the area behind each goal offers standing accommodation with railings on the home side and a grass seating area on the away side. Spectator seating is finished in the club's colours of navy and white. A large video screen is installed at the rear of the back stand. The stadium is also equipped with a sub-ground training pitch and a two-storey clubhouse.

Beyond the pitch itself, the ground includes a dedicated club shop, an events stage, and around 60 food and beverage spaces, including stalls and food trucks. The stadium was deliberately named "Station" rather than "Stadium" or "Arena", reflecting club president Oguri's intention for it to serve as a communal gathering place rather than a purely sporting venue.

== Legal dispute ==
In developing the stadium, the city and Tochigi City FC had signed a memorandum of understanding in which the city would fully exempt the site from property tax and park usage fees for up to ten years following completion. The arrangement drew criticism from some members of the city council, who raised concerns about delays in amending a related ordinance that prohibited the use of the park for purposes other than those originally intended. An amendment bill was subsequently submitted at the September regular session, accompanied by a formal apology from the city, and passed with a majority vote.

On 21 May 2021, a group of 50 Tochigi citizens filed a lawsuit against the city and Mayor Ōkawa in the Utsunomiya District Court, seeking an injunction against the property tax exemption and a declaration that the waiving of park usage fees during the construction period had been unlawful. The city argued that the arrangement was justified by the public benefit of the stadium, but the court ruled against it in January 2022, finding that this public benefit case could not be substantiated on objectively verifiable grounds. The ruling prohibited the reduction of property tax going forward and declared the reduction of park usage fees illegal. Tochigi City appealed to the Tokyo High Court, but the appeal was dismissed in October 2023.

Following the dismissal, the city announced it would not pursue a further appeal and would seek recovery of approximately ¥6 million (US$37,898.89) in property taxes and approximately ¥47.9 million (US$302,559.44) in park usage fees from Nippon Rika Kogyosho. The company subsequently began making payments, but filed a counter-claim against the city seeking damages of more than ¥167 million (US$1.05 million) — equivalent to ten years of property taxes and park usage fees — on the grounds that the city had failed to honour the original memorandum of understanding.

== Transport ==
=== Train ===
- 30–40 minutes on foot or 5 minutes in a taxi from Iwafune Station on the Ryōmō Line

=== Bus ===
- The "Fureai Bus" connects Tochigi Station and Iwafune Station with the stadium and is available at the adjacent City Gym & Spa (Yurakukan).

=== Car ===
- 10 minutes from Sano-Fujioka interchange on the Tōhoku Expressway.

== See also ==
- List of football stadiums in Japan
