= Ayumu Kameda =

Japanese footballer (born 2006)

Ayumu Kameda 亀田 歩夢
Personal information
- Date of birth: 19 December 2006 (age 19)
- Place of birth: Kanagawa Prefecture, Japan
- Height: 1.68 m (5 ft 6 in)
- Position: Midfielder

Team information
- Current team: Kataller Toyama
- Number: 7

Youth career
- –2024: RKU Kashiwa High School

Senior career*
Years	Team	Apps	(Gls)
2025–	Kataller Toyama	31	(7)
- * Club domestic league appearances and goals as of 21 September 2026

Ayumu Kameda (Japanese: 亀田 歩夢; born 19 December 2006) is a Japanese professional footballer who plays as a midfielder for J2 League club Kataller Toyama.

== Early life ==
Kameda was born on 19 December 2006 in Japan and is a native of Kanagawa Prefecture, Japan. Growing up, he played futsal and attended RKU Kashiwa High School in Japan.

== Career ==
Kameda started his career with Kataller Toyama ahead of the 2025 season.

== Career statistics ==
As of 21 September 2026

Appearances and goals by club, season and competition
Club	Season	League			National cup (Note: Includes Emperors Cup)		League cup (Note: Includes J.League Cup)		Total	
Club	Season	Division	Apps	Goals	Apps	Goals	Apps	Goals	Apps	Goals
Kataller Toyama	2025	J2 League	9	1	2	0	1	0	12	1
Kataller Toyama	2026	J2/J3 (100)	18	6	0	0	0	0	18	6
Kataller Toyama	2026–27	J2 League	4	0	0	0	1	0	5	0
Kataller Toyama	Total		31	7	2	0	2	0	35	7
Career total			31	7	2	0	2	0	35	7

== Style of play ==
Kameda plays as a midfielder. Right-footed, he is known for his dribbling ability.
