= Shota Tamura =

Japanese footballer (born 1995)

Shota Tamura 田村 翔太
Personal information
- Full name: Shota Tamura
- Date of birth: February 4, 1995 (age 31)
- Place of birth: Owariasahi, Japan
- Height: 1.68 m (5 ft 6 in)
- Position: Midfielder

Team information
- Current team: Ehime FC
- Number: 17

Youth career
- 2010–2012: Yokkaichi Chuo Kogyo High School

Senior career*
| Years | Team | Apps | (Gls) |
| 2013–2017 | Shonan Bellmare | 0 | (0) |
| 2014–2015 | → Fukushima United (loan) | 23 | (1) |
| 2017 | → Fukushima United (loan) | 12 | (3) |
| 2018 | Fukushima United | 32 | (3) |
| 2019–2021 | Roasso Kumamoto | 25 | (3) |
| 2021–2022 | Suzuka Point Getters | 31 | (2) |
| 2022–2024 | Veertien Mie | 86 | (32) |
| 2025–2026 | Nara Club | 52 | (22) |
| 2026– | Ehime FC | 13 | (9) |
- * Club domestic league appearances and goals as of 09:28, 30 October 2026 (UTC)

Shota Tamura (田村 翔太, Tamura Shota; born February 4, 1995 in Owariasahi) is a Japanese footballer who plays as a midfielder for J3 League club Ehime FC.

== Club statistics ==
As of 30 October 2026.

Appearances and goals by club, season and competition
| Club | Season | League | | | National cup (Note: Includes Emperor's Cup) | | League cup (Note: Includes J.League Cup) | | Total | |
| Club | Season | Division | Apps | Goals | Apps | Goals | Apps | Goals | Apps | Goals |
|---|---|---|---|---|---|---|---|---|---|---|
| Shonan Bellmare | 2013 | J.League Division 1 | 0 | 0 | 0 | 0 | 1 | 0 | 1 | 0 |
| Shonan Bellmare | 2016 | J1 League | 0 | 0 | 0 | 0 | 1 | 0 | 1 | 0 |
| Shonan Bellmare | Total | | 0 | 0 | 0 | 0 | 2 | 0 | 2 | 0 |
| Fukushima United (loan) | 2014 | J3 League | 7 | 0 | 0 | 0 | – | | 7 | 0 |
| Fukushima United (loan) | 2015 | J3 League | 16 | 1 | 0 | 0 | – | | 16 | 1 |
| Fukushima United (loan) | Total | | 23 | 1 | 0 | 0 | 0 | 0 | 23 | 1 |
| Fukushima United (loan) | 2017 | J3 League | 12 | 3 | 0 | 0 | – | | 12 | 3 |
| Fukushima United | 2018 | J3 League | 32 | 3 | 0 | 0 | – | | 32 | 3 |
| Roasso Kumamoto | 2019 | J3 League | 20 | 2 | 1 | 0 | – | | 21 | 2 |
| Roasso Kumamoto | 2020 | J3 League | 5 | 1 | 0 | 0 | – | | 5 | 1 |
| Roasso Kumamoto | Total | | 25 | 3 | 1 | 0 | 0 | 0 | 26 | 3 |
| Suzuka Point Getters | 2021 | JFL | 31 | 2 | 2 | 0 | – | | 33 | 2 |
| Veertien Mie | 2022 | JFL | 30 | 13 | 0 | 0 | – | | 30 | 13 |
| Veertien Mie | 2023 | JFL | 26 | 8 | 2 | 1 | – | | 28 | 9 |
| Veertien Mie | 2024 | JFL | 30 | 11 | 1 | 1 | – | | 31 | 12 |
| Veertien Mie | Total | | 86 | 32 | 3 | 2 | 0 | 0 | 89 | 34 |
| Nara Club | 2025 | J3 League | 32 | 7 | 1 | 1 | 1 | 0 | 34 | 8 |
| Nara Club | 2026 | J2/J3 (100) | 20 | 15 | – | | – | | 20 | 15 |
| Nara Club | Total | | 52 | 22 | 1 | 1 | 1 | 0 | 54 | 23 |
| Ehime FC | 2026–27 | J3 League | 13 | 9 | 1 | 0 | 0 | 0 | 14 | 9 |
| Career total | | | 274 | 75 | 8 | 3 | 3 | 0 | 285 | 78 |

== Honours ==
Individual

- Kunishige Kamamoto Award: 2026
- J2/J3 100 Year Vision League Regional Round East West A Best Eleven: 2026
