= Kyo Hosoi =

Japanese footballer

Kyo Hosoi 細井響
Personal information
- Date of birth: 31 October 2003 (age 23)
- Place of birth: Kashiwa, Chiba Prefecture, Japan
- Height: 1.83 m (6 ft 0 in)
- Position: Defender

Team information
- Current team: Yokohama FC
- Number: 5

Youth career
- –2018: Kashiwa Reysol
- 2019–2021: Narashino High School

College career
| Years | Team | Apps | (Gls) |
| 2022–2025 | Niigata University of H&W | 23 | (6) |

Senior career*
| Years | Team | Apps | (Gls) |
| 2025– | Yokohama FC | 29 | (2) |
- * Club domestic league appearances and goals as of 14 August 2026

Kyo Hosoi (細井響, Hosoi Kyo; born 31 October 2003) is a Japanese professional footballer who plays as a defender for J2 League club Yokohama FC.

== Youth career ==
Hosoi was born in Kashiwa, Chiba Prefecture, and grew up a short distance from Sankyo Frontier Kashiwa Stadium. Introduced to football by his older brother, he began playing at the age of five with local club FC Active Kashiwa. He joined Kashiwa Reysol's youth development system in his fourth year of elementary school, progressing to the U-15 side, though he was not promoted to the youth team.

At Narashino High School, Hosoi established himself in the starting lineup from his second year, helping the team reach the upper tier of Chiba Prefecture competition, though they did not qualify for the national tournament. Feeling he was not yet ready to pursue a professional career, he declined offers from Kantō University League clubs and instead chose Niigata University of Health and Welfare, seeking an environment where he could develop away from the highly competitive Kantō region.

Hosoi broke into the first team in the summer of his freshman year and developed into a first-choice left centre-back. In his third year he contributed to the team's runner-up finish in the 2024 All Japan University Football Championship. In his fourth year, he was appointed captain for the first time in his career.

His performances attracted attention from professional scouts, and in March 2025 it was announced he would join Yokohama FC as a designated special player.

== Club career ==
=== Yokohama FC ===
Hosoi made his debut as a designated special player for Yokohama FC in a 2–1 J.League Cup victory over Giravanz Kitakyushu in April 2025. He made his J.League debut in September 2025 in a 1–1 draw with Machida Zelvia and became a regular starter for the remainder of the season. He scored his first professional goal in a 1–0 league victory over Shonan Bellmare, scoring a left-footed half-volley into the roof of the net.

Following his breakout season as a designated special player, Hosoi was named as captain of Yokohama FC ahead of the J2–J3 100 Year Vision League, in spite of being a rookie.

== Career statistics ==
=== Club ===
As of 17 February 2026

Appearances and goals by club, season and competition
| Club | Season | League | | | National Cup | | League Cup | | Other | | Total | |
| Club | Season | Division | Apps | Goals | Apps | Goals | Apps | Goals | Apps | Goals | Apps | Goals |
| Japan | | | League | | Emperor's Cup | | J. League Cup | | Other | | Total | |
|---|---|---|---|---|---|---|---|---|---|---|---|---|
| Niigata University of H&W | 2023 | – | | | 1 | 0 | – | | – | | 1 | 0 |
| Niigata University of H&W | 2025 | – | | | 1 | 0 | – | | – | | 1 | 0 |
| Niigata University of H&W | Total | | 0 | 0 | 2 | 0 | 0 | 0 | 0 | 0 | 2 | 0 |
| Yokohama FC | 2025 | J1 League | 8 | 1 | 0 | 0 | 4 | 0 | – | | 12 | 1 |
| Yokohama FC | 2026 | J2/J3 (100) | 2 | 0 | – | | – | | – | | 2 | 0 |
| Yokohama FC | Total | | 10 | 1 | 0 | 0 | 4 | 0 | 0 | 0 | 14 | 1 |
| Career total | | | 10 | 1 | 2 | 0 | 4 | 0 | 0 | 0 | 16 | 1 |
