= Shuntaro Koga =

Japanese footballer

Personal information
- Date of birth: 27 August 1998 (age 28)
- Place of birth: Tokyo, Japan
- Height: 1.81 m (5 ft 11 in)
- Position: Forward

Team information
- Current team: AC Nagano Parceiro
- Number: 46

Youth career
- Cristoloa SC
- FC Tucano
- –2014: Tokyo Verdy
- 2014–2015: Leicester City
- 2015–2017: PEC Zwolle
- 2018–2019: Union SG

Senior career*
Years	Team	Apps	(Gls)
2019	Auda		
2020	Renofa Yamaguchi	1	(0)
2021–2022	FC Kariya	26	(2)
2022	Caroline Springs		
2022–2023	YSCC Yokohama	52	(3)
2024–	AC Nagano Parceiro	66	(1)
- * Club domestic league appearances and goals as of 17 August 2026

Shuntaro Koga (古賀 俊太郎, Koga Shuntaro; born 27 August 1998) is a Japanese footballer currently playing as a forward for AC Nagano Parceiro.

== Club career ==
=== Early career and move to Europe ===
After graduating from junior high school, Koga embarked on a career which took him first to English Premier League side Leicester City. Having failed to establish himself in the club's youth ranks, he moved to the Netherlands, signing with PEC Zwolle, where he stayed for two years. However, as he was unable to receive a work permit in the Netherlands, he left the club in 2017. He went on to trial with Belgian side Cercle Brugge and French side Troyes, before joining Royale Union Saint-Gilloise in February 2018.

=== Return to Japan ===
Koga first returned to Japan in early 2019, going on trial with Yokohama F. Marinos. This trial proved to be unsuccessful, and after a spell back in Europe with Latvian side FK Auda, he signed for J2 League side Renofa Yamaguchi in February 2020. Having only made one appearance for Renofa Yamaguchi, he dropped down to the Japan Football League with FC Kariya for the 2021 season.

After a short spell in Australia with Caroline Springs, Koga signed for J3 League side YSCC Yokohama for the 2022 season.

== Career statistics ==
=== Club ===
As of 27 November 2020.

Club	Season	League			National Cup		League Cup		Other		Total	
Club	Season	Division	Apps	Goals	Apps	Goals	Apps	Goals	Apps	Goals	Apps	Goals
Renofa Yamaguchi	2020	J2 League	1	0	0	0	0	0	0	0	1	0
FC Kariya	2021	JFL	26	2	1 (Note: Appearances in the Emperor's Cup)	0	–		1 (Note: Appearances in the JFL Relegation Playoffs)	0	28	2
YSCC Yokohama	2022	J3 League	18	1	0	0	–		0	0	18	1
Career total			45	3	1	0	0	0	1	0	47	3
