= Kaiga Murakoshi =

Japanese footballer

Kaiga Murakoshi 村越 凱光
Personal information
- Date of birth: 7 October 2001 (age 25)
- Place of birth: Kanagawa, Japan
- Height: 1.67 m (5 ft 6 in)
- Position: Midfielder

Team information
- Current team: Tegevajaro Miyazaki
- Number: 99

Youth career
- Kouzu SSS
- –2016: Esporte Fujisawa
- 2017–2019: Iizuka High School

Senior career*
Years	Team	Apps	(Gls)
2020–2026	Matsumoto Yamaga	133	(28)
2022	→ ReinMeer Aomori (loan)	16	(3)
2026–	Tegevajaro Miyazaki	9	(3)
- * Club domestic league appearances and goals as of 16 August 2026

Kaiga Murakoshi (村越 凱光, Murakoshi Kaiga; born 7 October 2001) is a Japanese footballer currently playing as a midfielder for J2 League club Tegevajaro Miyazaki.

== Career statistics ==
=== Club ===
As of 4 October 2026.

Appearances and goals by club, season and competition
Club	Season	League			National cup (Note: Includes Emperor's Cup)		League cup (Note: Includes J.League Cup)		Other		Total	
Club	Season	Division	Apps	Goals	Apps	Goals	Apps	Goals	Apps	Goals	Apps	Goals
Matsumoto Yamaga	2020	J2 League	2	0	0	0	0	0	0	0	2	0
Matsumoto Yamaga	2021	J2 League	7	0	2	1	0	0	0	0	9	1
Matsumoto Yamaga	2022	J3 League	5	0	2	0	0	0	0	0	7	0
Matsumoto Yamaga	2023	J3 League	31	6	0	0	0	0	0	0	31	6
Matsumoto Yamaga	2024	J3 League	36	8	0	0	2	0	2 (Note: Appearance in J2/J3 play-offs)	0	40	8
Matsumoto Yamaga	2025	J3 League	33	8	2	1	1	0	0	0	36	9
Matsumoto Yamaga	2026	J2/J3 (100)	19	6	–		–		0	0	19	6
Matsumoto Yamaga	Total		133	28	6	2	3	0	2	0	144	30
ReinMeer Aomori (loan)	2022	JFL	16	3	–		–		–		16	3
Tegevajaro Miyazaki	2026–27	J2 League	9	3	1	0	0	0	–		10	3
Career total			158	34	7	2	3	0	2	0	170	36
