= Ichigo Miyazaki Shintomi Football Stadium =

Football stadium in Japan

- いちご宮崎新富サッカー場
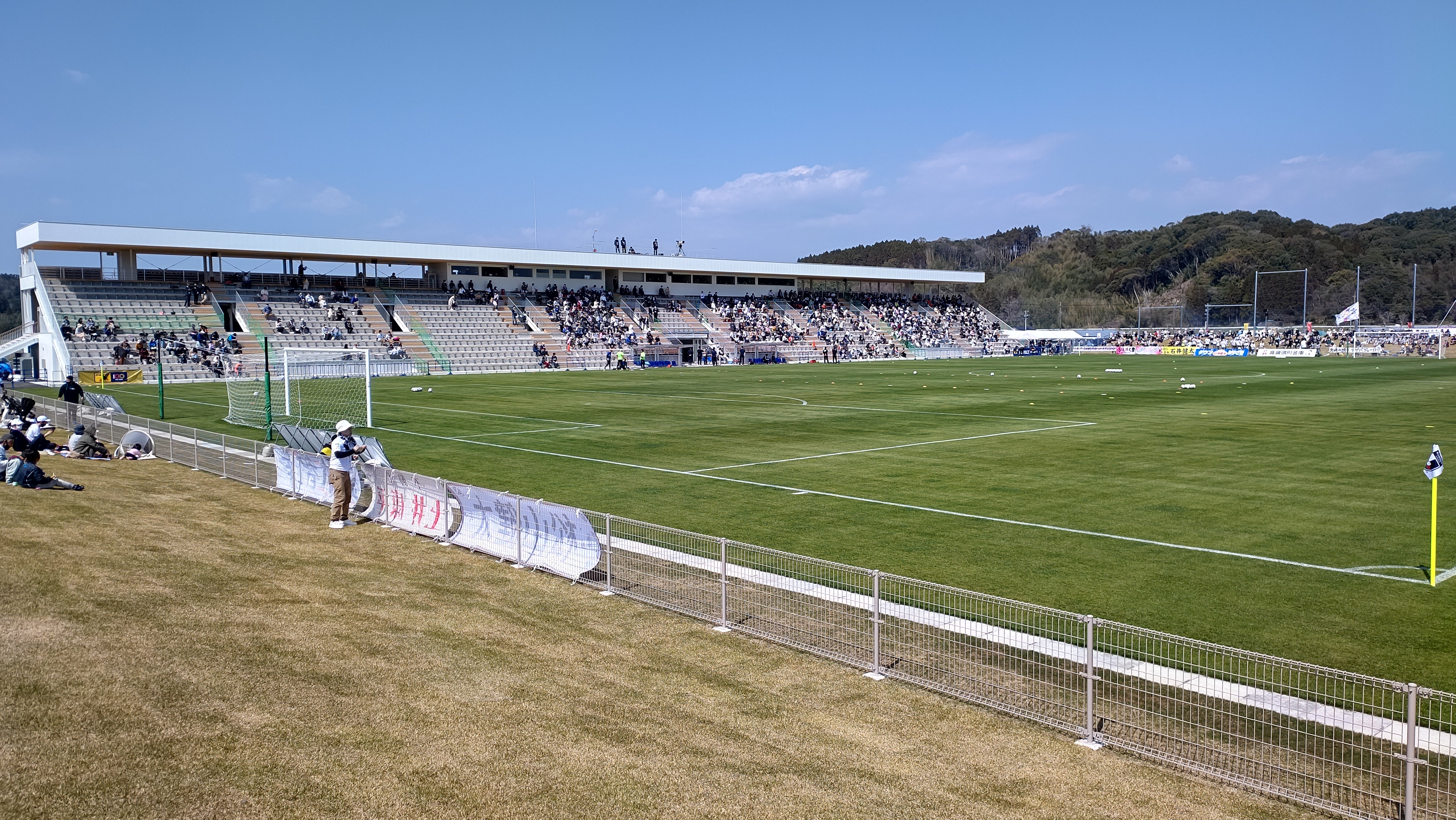

- Location within Miyazaki Prefecture Location within Japan
- Interactive map of Ichigo Miyazaki Shintomi Football Stadium
- Full name: 新富テゲバサッカースタジアム
- Location: Shintomi, Miyazaki, Japan
- Coordinates: 32°04′23.26″N 131°29′30.62″E
- Owner: Shintomi, Miyazaki
- Capacity: 5,354

Construction
- Opened: February 15, 2021

Tenant
- Tegevajaro Miyazaki

Ichigo Miyazaki Shintomi Football Stadium (いちご宮崎新富サッカー場) is a football stadium in Shintomi, Miyazaki, Japan.

It is the home stadium of football club Tegevajaro Miyazaki. Formerly known as Unilever Stadium Shintomi, the stadium received its new name, being used from the 2024 season onwards, as Ichigo Co., Ltd. acquired the ownership of Tegevajaro Miyazaki and their stadium's naming rights.
