= Takaya Inui =

Japanese footballer (born 1996)

Takaya Inui 乾 貴哉
Personal information
- Full name: Takaya Inui
- Date of birth: 12 May 1996 (age 30)
- Place of birth: Gunma, Japan
- Height: 1.87 m (6 ft 2 in)
- Positions: Centre back; left back

Team information
- Current team: Tochigi City FC
- Number: 33

Youth career
- 2012–2014: Kiryu Daiichi High School

Senior career*
Years	Team	Apps	(Gls)
2015–2020	JEF United Chiba	58	(3)
2015	→ J.League U-22 (loan)	7	(0)
2020	→ Mito HollyHock (loan)	15	(0)
2021–2024	Giravanz Kitakyushu	110	(8)
2025–	Tochigi City FC	24	(1)
- * Club domestic league appearances and goals as of 16 August 2026

Takaya Inui (乾 貴哉, Inui Takaya; born May 12, 1996 in Gunma) is a Japanese football player who play as a Centre back, Left back and currently play for J2 League club, Tochigi City FC.

== Career ==
On 16 December 2024, Inui announcement officially permanent transfer to newly promoted J3 club, Tochigi City FC from 2025 season.

== Career statistics ==
=== Club ===
As of the match played 15 February 2025.

Club performance			League		Cup		League Cup		Total	
Season	Club	League	Apps	Goals	Apps	Goals	Apps	Goals	Apps	Goals
Japan			League		Emperor's Cup		J.League Cup		Total	
2015	JEF United Chiba	J2 League	0	0	1	0	–		1	0
2015	J.League U-22(loan)	J3 League	7	0	0	0	–		7	0
2016	JEF United Chiba	J2 League	7	0	0	0	–		7	0
2017	JEF United Chiba	J2 League	25	3	2	0	–		27	3
2018	JEF United Chiba	J2 League	13	0	1	0	–		14	0
2019	JEF United Chiba	J2 League	13	0	0	0	–		13	0
2020	Mito HollyHock (loan)	J2 League	15	0	0	0	–		15	0
2021	Giravanz Kitakyushu	J2 League	13	1	0	0	–		13	1
2022	Giravanz Kitakyushu	J3 League	27	0	1	0	–		28	0
2023	Giravanz Kitakyushu	J3 League	33	5	2	0	–		35	5
2024	Giravanz Kitakyushu	J3 League	37	2	1	0	1	0	39	2
2025	Tochigi City FC	J3 League	1	0	0	0	0	0	1	0
Career total			191	11	7	0	1	0	199	11
