= Kanazawa Stadium =

Football stadium in Kanazawa, Ishikawa, Japan

- 金沢スタジアム
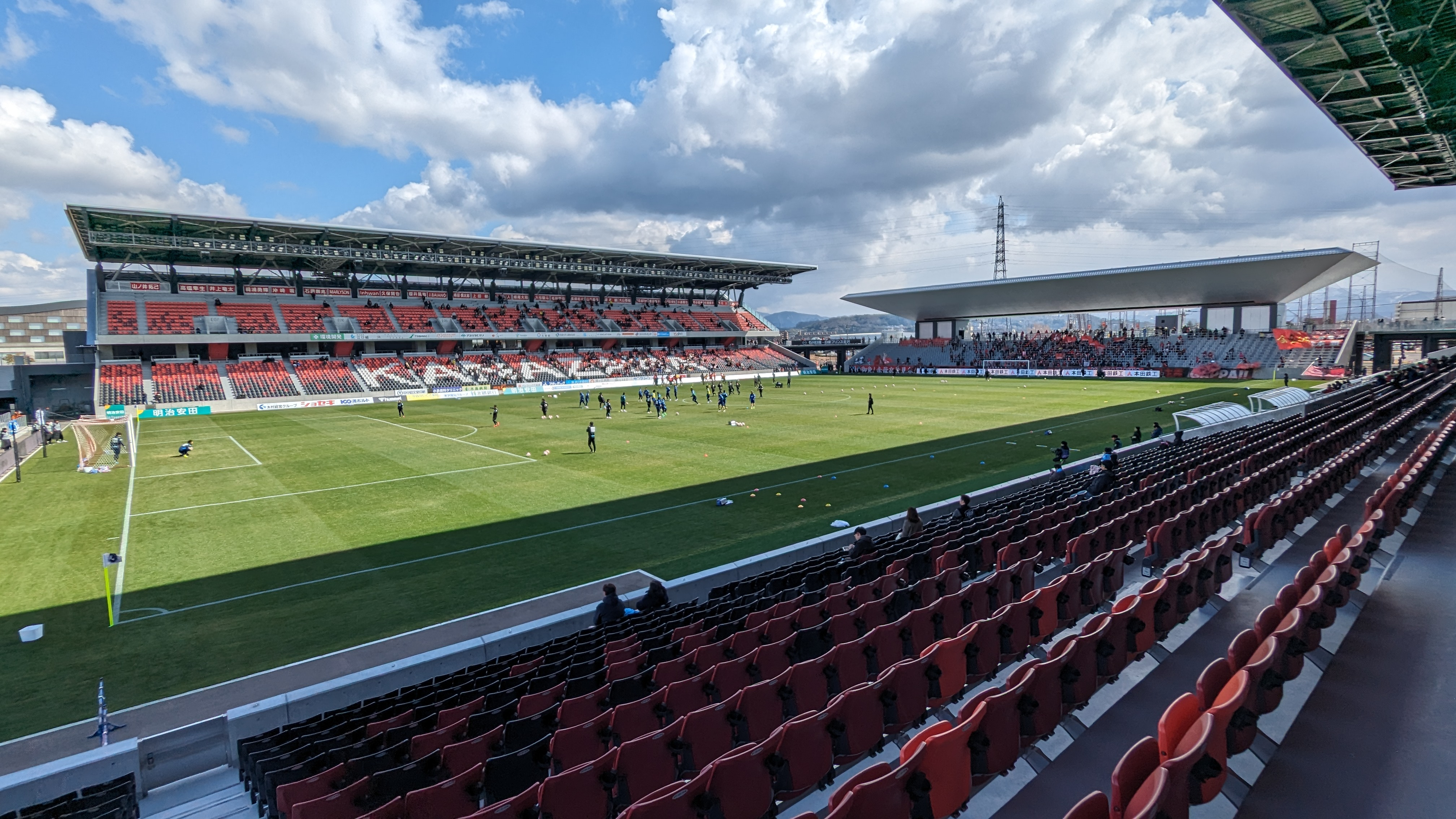

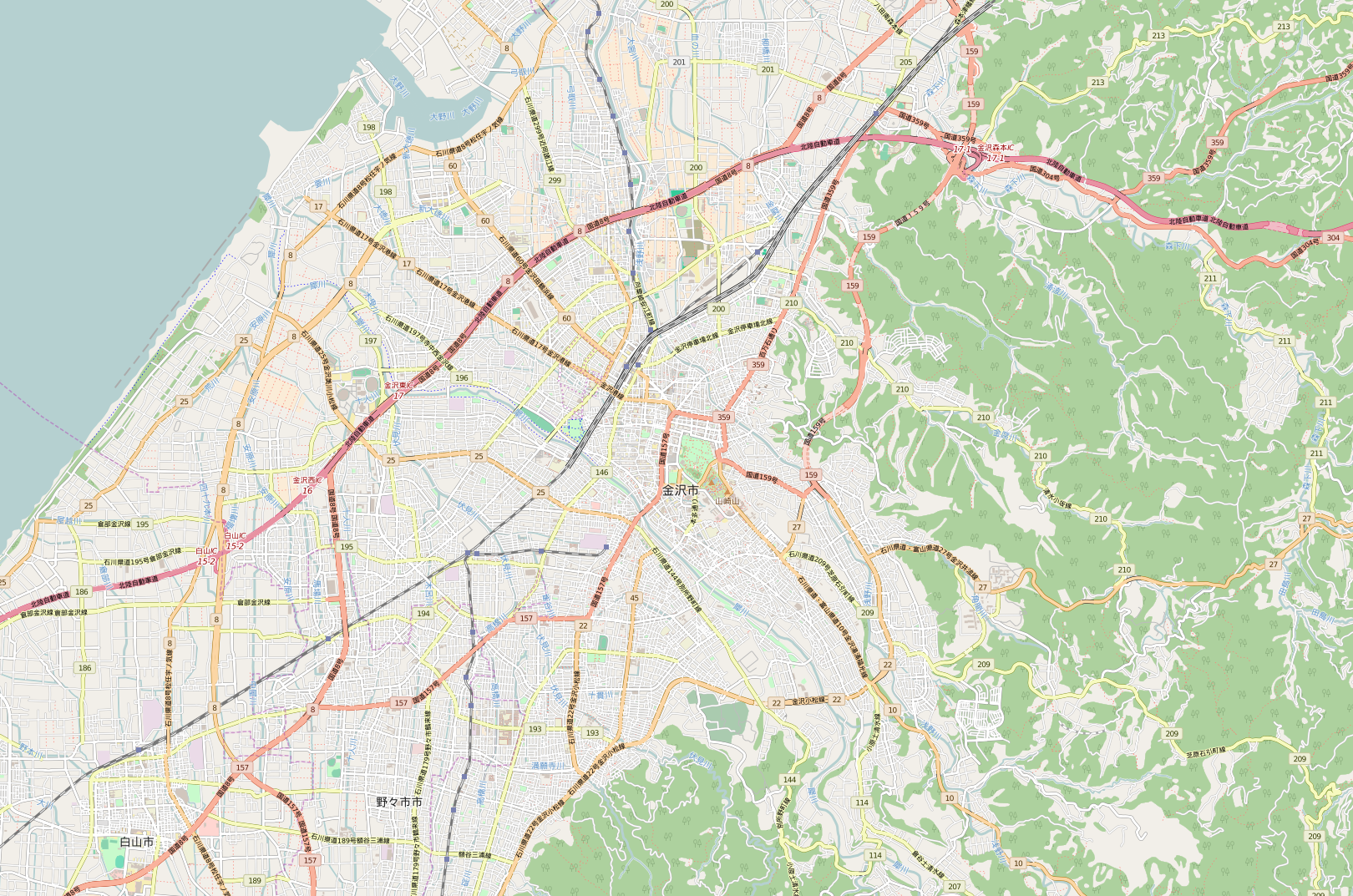
- Location within Kanazawa, Ishikawa Location within Ishikawa Prefecture Location within Japan
- Interactive map of Kanazawa Stadium
- Address: 2-25-1 Isobemachi, Kanazawa, Ishikawa 920-0012; Kanazawa; Japan
- Location: Kanazawa, Ishikawa, Japan
- Coordinates: 36°35′46″N 136°39′26″E
- Owner: Kanazawa City
- Operator: Ishikawa Zweigen, KCS, Kanazawa City Sports Foundation
- Capacity: 10,444
- Surface: Natural Grass

Construction
- Groundbreaking: 28 September 2021; 4 years ago
- Opened: 18 February 2024; 2 years ago
- Cost: 7,980,000,000 ¥
- Architect: Azusa Sekkei (ja)

Tenant
- Zweigen Kanazawa (2024–present)

Kanazawa Go Go Curry Stadium (金沢ゴーゴーカレースタジアム, Kanazawa Go Go Kare Sutajiamu), officially Kanazawa Stadium, is a football stadium in Kanazawa Johoku Municipal Sports Park in Kanazawa, Ishikawa, Japan. The facility is owned by Kanazawa City and is operated and managed by the Kanazawa City Sports Corporation, Ishikawa Zweigen (Zweigen Kanazawa Management Company), and KCS as designated managers. The Gogo Curry Group, headquartered in Kanazawa City, has acquired the naming rights and uses the name "Kanazawa Go Go Curry Stadium"

The stadium is home to J3 League side Zweigen Kanazawa since 2024.
