= Hayato Hasegawa =

Japanese footballer

Personal information
- Full name: Hayato Hasegawa
- Date of birth: 14 September 1997 (age 29)
- Place of birth: Kawasaki, Kanagawa, Japan
- Height: 1.80 m (5 ft 11 in)
- Position: Midfielder

Team information
- Current team: AC Nagano Parceiro
- Number: 6

Youth career
- Motoishikawa SC
- –2015: Kawasaki Frontale

College career
Years	Team	Apps	(Gls)
2016–2019	Hannan University		

Senior career*
Years	Team	Apps	(Gls)
2020–2025	Kamatamare Sanuki	146	(5)
2026–	AC Nagano Parceiro	19	(1)
- * Club domestic league appearances and goals as of 17 August 2026

Hayato Hasegawa (長谷川 隼, Hasegawa Hayato; born 14 September 1997) is a Japanese footballer currently playing as a midfielder for AC Nagano Parceiro.

== Career ==
Hayato made his league debut for Kamatamare against Azul Claro Numazu on the 2 August 2020. He scored his first goal for the club against SC Sagamihara on the 18 June 2022, scoring in the 24th minute.

== Club statistics ==
As of 13 July 2021.

Club	Season	League			National Cup		League Cup		Other		Total	
Club	Season	Division	Apps	Goals	Apps	Goals	Apps	Goals	Apps	Goals	Apps	Goals
Kamatamare Sanuki	2020	J3 League	19	0	0	0	–		0	0	19	0
Kamatamare Sanuki	2021	J3 League	6	0	1 (Note: Appearances in the Emperor's Cup)	0	–		0	0	7	0
Career total			25	0	1	0	0	0	0	0	26	0
