= Prifoods Stadium =

Multi-purpose sports ground in Hachinohe, Japan

- 八戸市多賀多目的運動場 天然芝球技場 "プライフーズスタジアム"
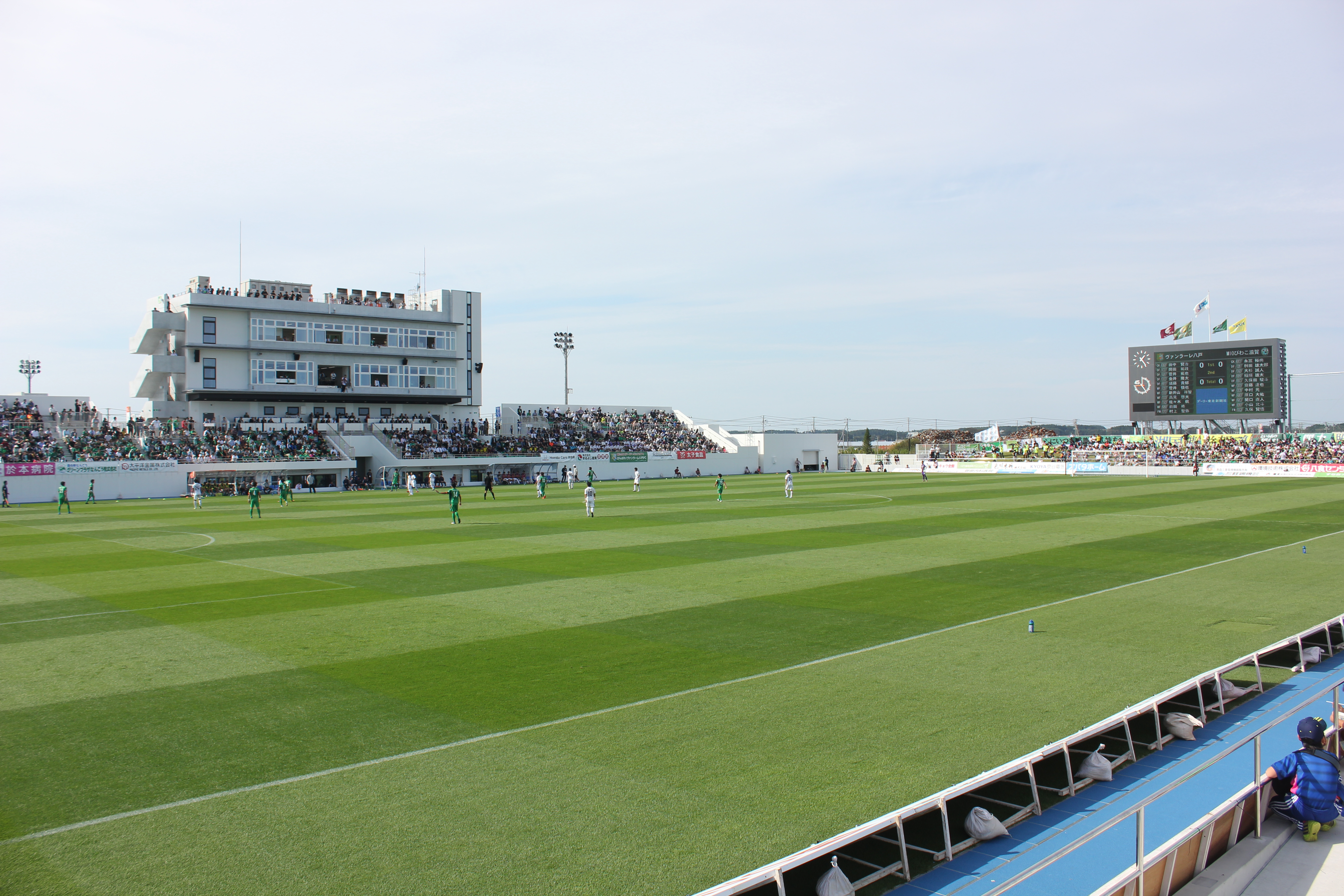

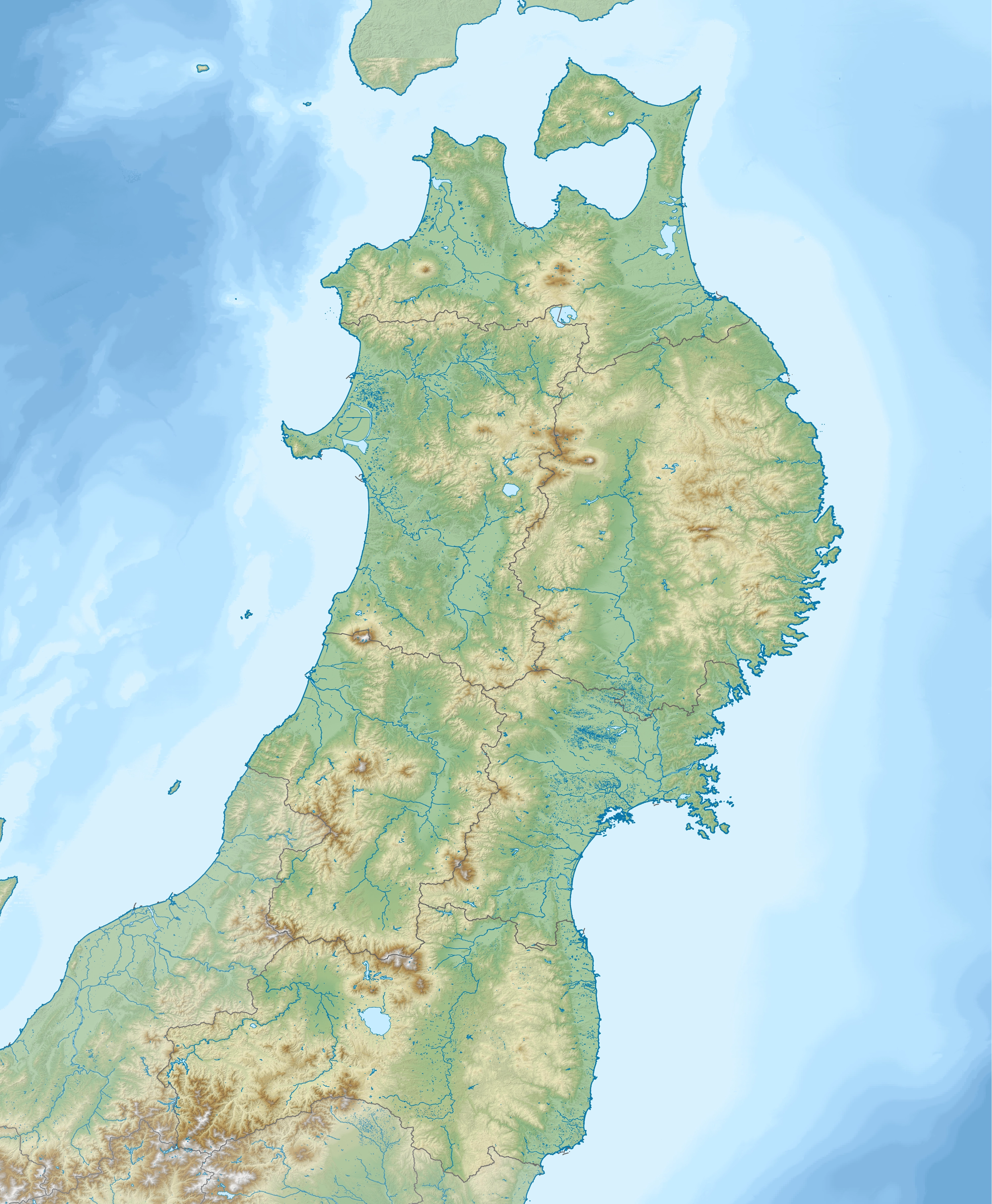
- Location within Aomori Prefecture Location within Tohoku, Japan Location within Japan
- Interactive map of Prifoods Stadium
- Former names: Daihatsu Stadium' (2016-2019)
- Location: Hachinohe, Aomori, Japan
- Coordinates: 40°35′25.7″N 141°27′22″E
- Owner: Hachinohe Shicho
- Capacity: 5,124

Construction
- Opened: 2016

Tenant
- Vanraure Hachinohe

Website
- Homepage

Prifoods Stadium (プライフーズスタジアム) is a football stadium in Hachinohe, Aomori, Japan. It was formerly known as Daihatsu Stadium. Since April 2019 it has been called Prifoods Stadium for the naming rights by Prifoods.

It is one of the home stadium of football club Vanraure Hachinohe.

== Gallery ==
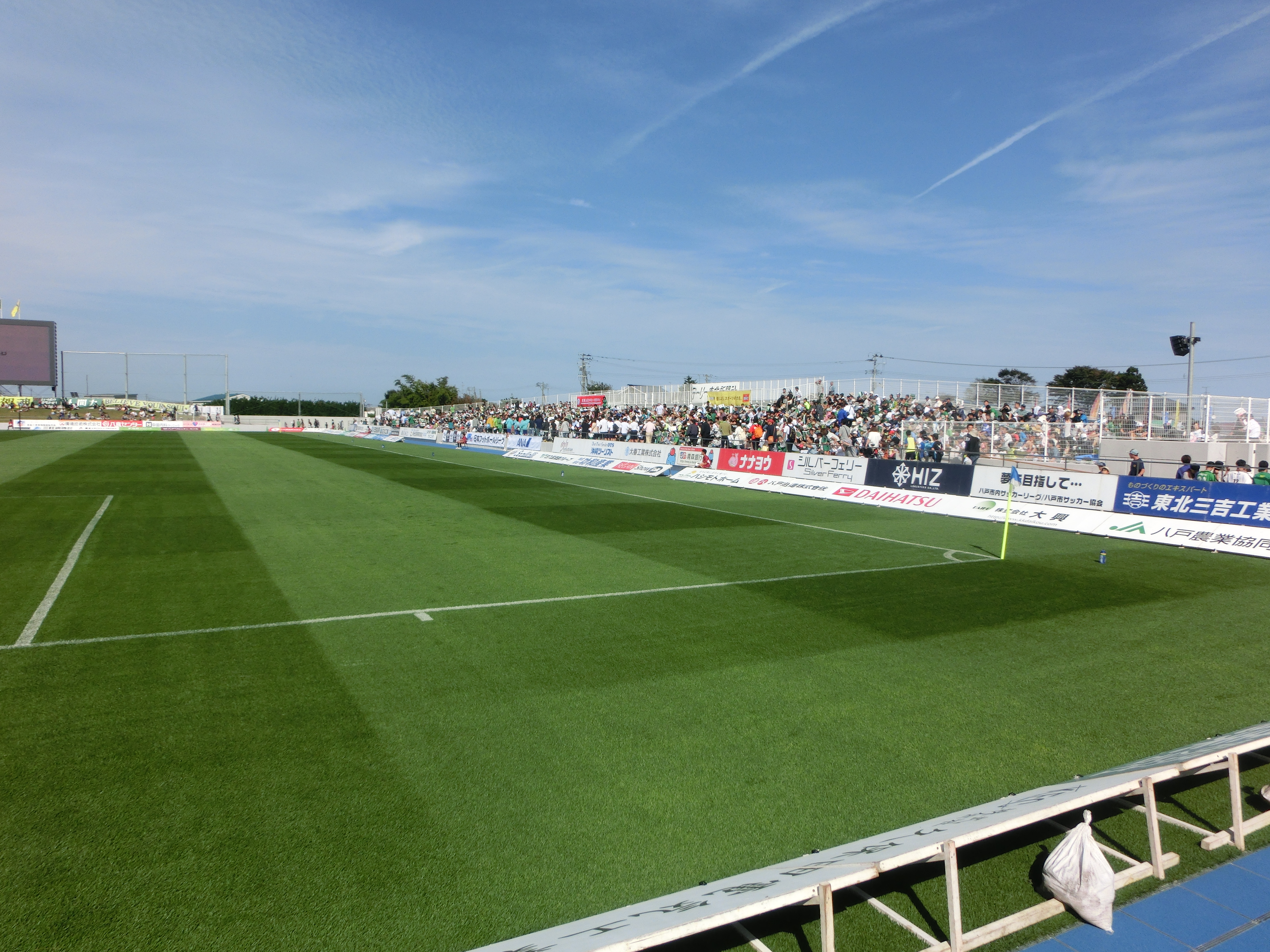

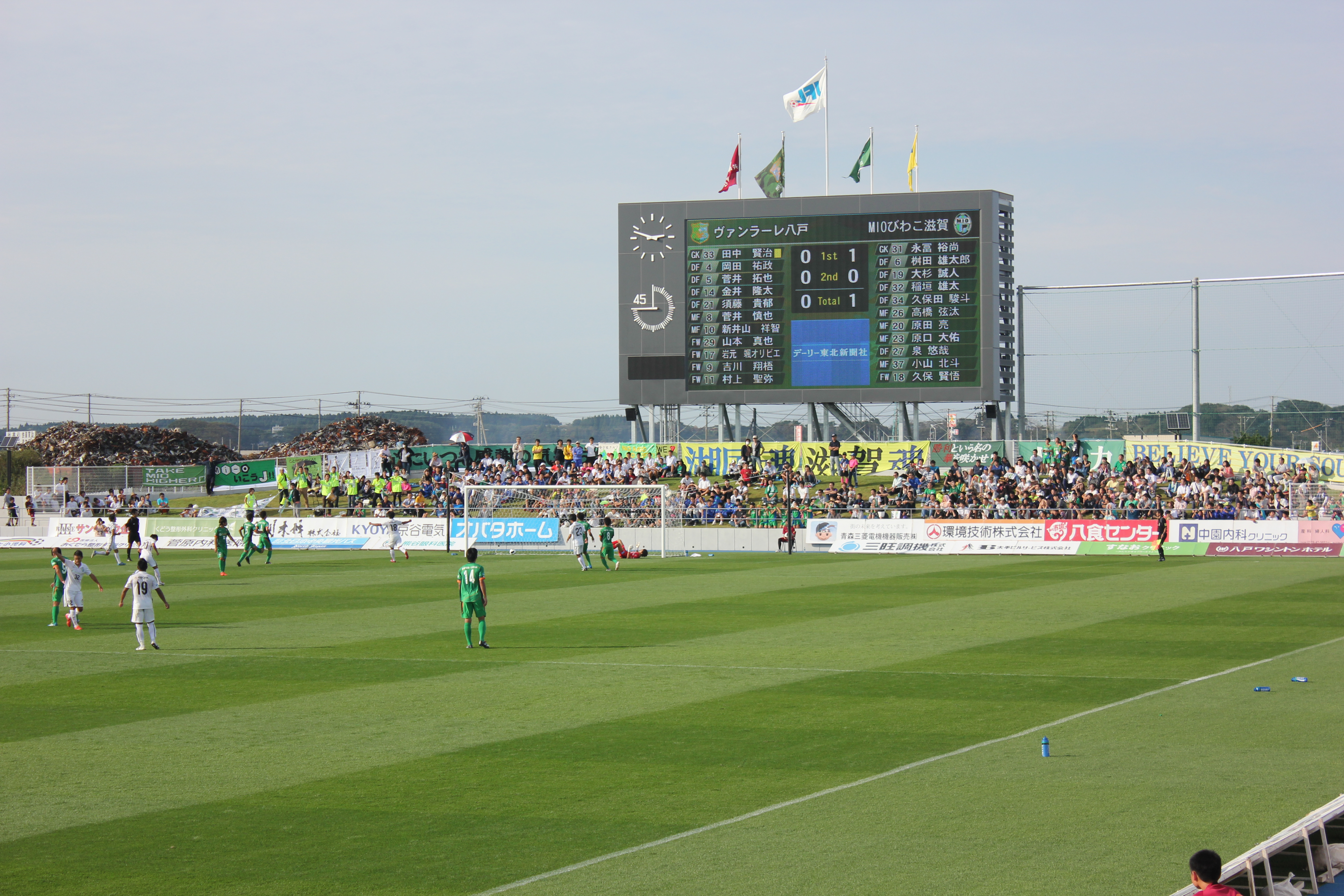
Diamond Vision scoreboard
