= Junya Suzuki (footballer, born May 1996) =

Japanese footballer

Personal information
- Date of birth: 2 May 1996 (age 30)
- Place of birth: Tochigi, Japan
- Height: 1.82 m (6 ft 0 in)
- Position: Defender

Team information
- Current team: FC Ryukyu
- Number: 14

Youth career
- Hongo Kita FC
- –2011: Wings Kanuma SC
- 2012–2014: Kiryu Daiichi High School

College career
Years	Team	Apps	(Gls)
2015–2018	Rissho University		

Senior career*
Years	Team	Apps	(Gls)
2019–2020	Thespakusatsu Gunma	9	(0)
2021–2023	Gainare Tottori	92	(3)
2024–	FC Ryukyu	83	(4)
- * Club domestic league appearances and goals as of 25 August 2026

Junya Suzuki (鈴木 順也, Suzuki Jun'ya; born 2 May 1996) is a Japanese footballer who plays as a defender for J3 League club FC Ryukyu.

== Career statistics ==
=== Club ===
As of 13 November 2020.

Club	Season	League			National Cup		League Cup		Other		Total	
Club	Season	Division	Apps	Goals	Apps	Goals	Apps	Goals	Apps	Goals	Apps	Goals
Thespakusatsu Gunma	2019	J3 League	2	0	1 (Note: Appearances in the Emperor's Cup)	0	–		0	0	3	0
Thespakusatsu Gunma	2020	J2 League	6	0	0	0	0	0	0	0	6	0
Career total			8	0	1	0	0	0	0	0	8	0
