= AC Nagano Parceiro =

Japanese football club

AC Nagano Parceiro AC長野パルセイロ
- Full name: Athletic Club Nagano Parceiro
- Nickname: Parceiro
- Founded: 1990; 36 years ago
- Stadium: Minami Nagano Sports Park Stadium (Nagano, Nagano)
- Capacity: 15,515
- Chairman: Teizo Horie
- Manager: Chikara Fujimoto
- League: J3 League
- 2025: J3 League, 19th of 20
- Website: www.parceiro.co.jp
Home colours	Away colours

Athletic Club Nagano Parceiro or AC Nagano Parceiro (AC長野パルセイロ, E Shī Nagano Paruseiro) is a Japanese football club based in Nagano, capital of Nagano Prefecture. They play in the J3 League, Japanese third tier of professional football.

== History ==
=== Foundation and early development (1990–2013) ===
The history of the club dates back to 1990 when a group of local high school graduates started a football club Nagano Elza SC. The team colours, orange and dark blue, represent Nagano Prefecture, and the team logo uses a lioness named Elza.

In 2007, the club changed the name to AC Nagano Parceiro because the name "Elza" had already been trademarked. However, the club decided to keep the team colors and logo.

In 2011, the team's first season in the JFL, they finished in the second place, but the team was not qualified to for J2 League. J. League Associate Membership status was not granted because the capacity of their stadium did not satisfy the league's requirement (minimum 10,000 seats).

In 2014, the team became the member of the newly founded J3 league, and later acquired the J. League Associate Membership in September as their stadium capacity met the required minimum number of seats.

=== Establishment in J3 and promotion ambitions (2014–present) ===
Since joining the J3 League in 2014, AC Nagano Parceiro has consistently aimed for promotion to higher divisions. The club has often finished in competitive positions within the league, though promotion to the J2 League has remained elusive.

AC Nagano Parceiro has built a reputation for its organized style of play and strong defensive performances. The club has also placed emphasis on youth development and community engagement, strengthening its presence in Nagano Prefecture.

In addition to its men's team, the club is notable for its successful women's side, which has competed at the top level of Japanese women's football and achieved domestic success.

In recent years, AC Nagano Parceiro continues to push for promotion while maintaining its identity as a community-focused club representing Nagano.

== Team image ==
=== Name origin ===
The club name parceiro means "partner" in Portuguese.

=== Supporters ===
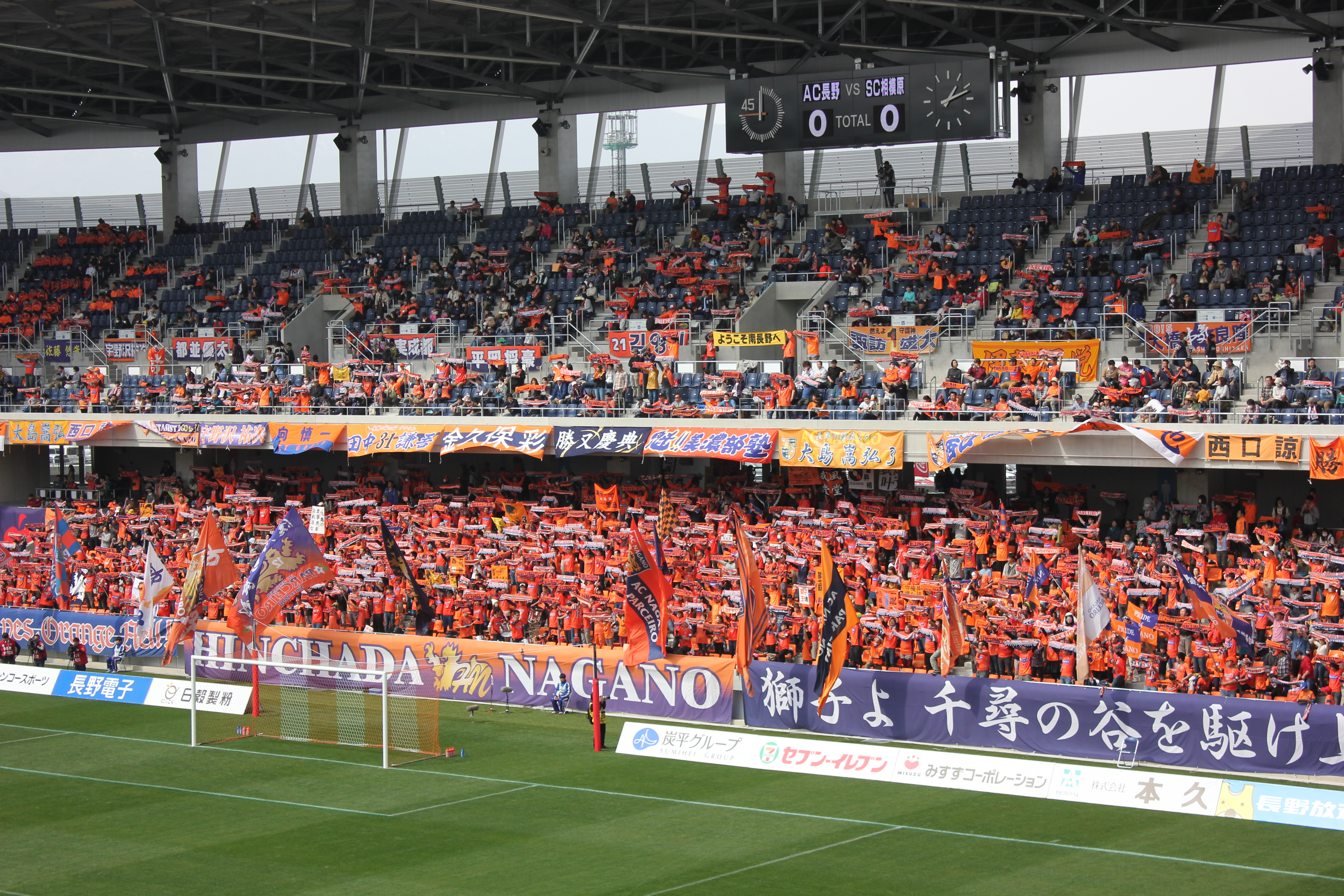
AC Nagano Parceiro fans

The supporters of AC Nagano Parceiro are mainly based in Nagano Prefecture, particularly in and around the city of Nagano. The club has built a loyal and steadily growing fanbase since its rise through the Japanese football league system.

On matchdays at Minami Nagano Sports Park Stadium, supporters gather in organized sections, leading chants, waving flags, and displaying banners. The atmosphere is energetic yet community-oriented, reflecting the club's identity as a team closely connected to its local supporters.

Fans of AC Nagano Parceiro are also known for supporting both the men's and women's teams, contributing to a unified club culture. Their consistent backing has played an important role in the club's ambitions to rise through the J.League system.

=== Rivalries ===
AC Nagano Parceiro's most notable rivalry is with neighboring club Matsumoto Yamaga. Matches between the two sides are often referred to as the Shinshū derby, representing a contest for regional pride within Nagano Prefecture. The rivalry is fueled by the geographical proximity of Nagano and Matsumoto, as well as the clubs' ambitions to establish dominance in the region.

== Stadium ==
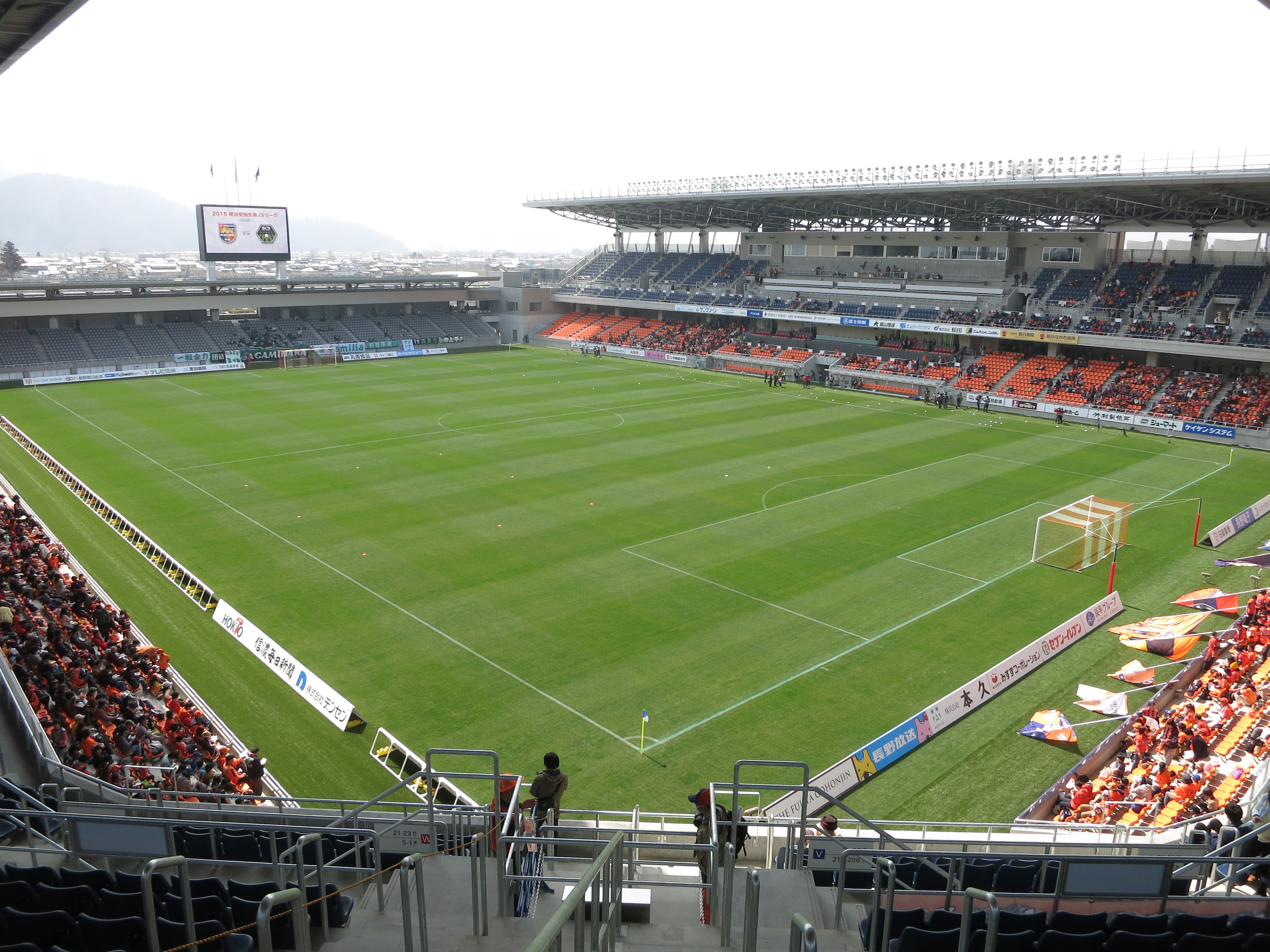
Minami Nagano Sports Park Stadium

AC Nagano Parceiro plays its home matches at Minami Nagano Sports Park Stadium, located in the city of Nagano. Opened in 2015, the stadium has a seating capacity of approximately 15,491 spectators and is designed primarily for football.

The stadium features a contemporary design with a fully covered main stand and steep seating areas that provide clear sightlines of the pitch. Unlike many older Japanese stadiums, it was built with football in mind, allowing supporters to feel close to the action despite being a multi-purpose facility. The venue also includes training pitches, locker room facilities, and media infrastructure that meet professional league standards. The venue features modern facilities with stands positioned relatively close to the pitch, allowing for good sightlines and a strong connection between players and supporters.

Situated within the Minami Nagano Sports Park complex, the stadium is easily accessible for local supporters and serves as a central hub for football activities in the region. It regularly hosts matches in the J3 League and domestic competitions such as the Emperor's Cup. Its modern structure and compact layout contribute to a special matchday atmosphere.

== Kit suppliers and shirt sponsors ==
=== Kit evolution ===
Home kit – 1st
2007 – 2010	2011 – 2012	2013	2014	2015
2016	2017	2018	2019	2020
2021	2022	2023	2024	2025 –

Away kit – 2nd
2007 – 2010	2011 – 2012	2013	2014	2015
2016	2017	2018	2019	2020
2021	2022	2023	2024	2025 –

== Players ==
=== Current squad ===
As of 1 August 2026

Note: Flags indicate national team as defined under FIFA eligibility rules; some limited exceptions apply. Players may hold more than one non-FIFA nationality.

No.	Pos.	Nation	Player
1	GK	JPN	Ken Tajiri
2	DF	JPN	Shuichi Sakai
3	DF	JPN	Kohei Tomita
4	DF	JPN	Ei Gyotoku (on loan from Nagoya Grampus)
6	MF	JPN	Hayato Hasegawa
7	DF	JPN	Yuya Ono
8	MF	JPN	Takashi Kondo
9	FW	JPN	Shun Osaki (on loan from Roasso Kumamoto)
10	MF	JPN	Reo Yamanaka
11	FW	JPN	Kohei Shin
13	DF	JPN	Yuya Tsukegi
14	MF	JPN	Kyoji Kutsuna
15	MF	JPN	Kakeru Higuchi
16	DF	JPN	Koki Ishii
17	MF	JPN	Keisuke Ito
18	FW	JPN	Shu Yoshizawa

No.	Pos.	Nation	Player
19	FW	JPN	Hogara Shoji (on loan from Tochigi SC)
21	GK	JPN	Kojiro Nakano (on loan from Hokkaido Consadole Sapporo)
22	MF	JPN	Keisuke Yoshida
24	DF	JPN	Zen Watanabe
25	MF	JPN	Kosuke Tanaka
26	MF	JPN	Shunki Nakata
28	MF	JPN	Kotaro Fujikawa
30	MF	JPN	Keito Nojima
31	GK	JPN	Kotaro Makino
32	DF	JPN	Yuto Ozaki
39	MF	JPN	Kazuya Ando
40	MF	JPN	Yushi Hasegawa
46	MF	JPN	Shuntaro Koga
51	FW	JPN	Sotaro Shimizu
61	GK	JPN	Shuhei Shimotori ^{Type 2}
77	MF	JPN	Daichi Morita

== Management and staff ==
Position	Name
Manager	(Japan) Chikara Fujimoto
Assistant manager	(Japan) Keiichiro Nuno
First-team coach	(Japan) Hideki Ogawa
Goalkeeper coach	(Japan) Junnosuke Schneider
Physical coach	(Japan) Yukinori Motohashi
Technical coach	(Japan) Go Kusunoki
Chief trainer	(Japan) Taiki Hoshina (Japan) Kotaro Taisha (Japan) Takayuki Ando
Competent	(Japan) Sena Miura
Side affairs	(Japan) Nozomu Ueki

== Honours ==
AC Nagano Parceiro Honours
Honour	No.	Years
Hokushin'etsu Football League	4	2002, 2005, 2008, 2010
Nagano Prefectural Football Championship Emperor's Cup Nagano Prefectural Qualifiers	11	2004, 2012, 2013, 2015, 2016, 2017, 2018, 2019, 2021, 2023, 2024
Shakaijin Cup	1	2010
Japan Football League	1	2013

== Managerial history ==
Manager	Tenure	
Manager	Start	Finish
(Japan) Takanori Kominato	1 February 2000	31 January 2006
(Brazil) Badú	16 March 2006	31 December 2009
(Japan) Norihiro Satsukawa	1 February 2010	31 January 2013
(Japan) Naohiko Minobe	1 February 2013	6 August 2015
(Japan) Hajime Etō	5 August 2015	31 December 2015
(Japan) Fumitake Miura	1 February 2016	31 January 2017
(Japan) Tetsuya Asano	1 January 2017	12 June 2018
(Japan) Yuji Sakakura	13 June 2018	31 January 2019
(Japan) Yuji Yokoyama	1 February 2019	28 October 2021
(Japan) Hideo Yoshizawa	28 October 2021	31 January 2022
(Germany) Yuki Richard Stalph	1 February 2022	27 August 2023
(Japan) Riki Takagi	30 August 2023	25 November 2024
(Japan) Chikara Fujimoto	11 December 2024	Present

== Season by season record ==
Champions	Runners-up	Third place	Promoted	Relegated

League														J. League Cup	Emperor's Cup
Season	Div.	Tier	Teams	Pos.	GP	W	D	L	F	A	GD	Pts	Attendance/G	J. League Cup	Emperor's Cup
2011^{1}	JFL	3	18	2nd	33	19	6	8	51	27	24	63	2,281	Not eligible	Did not qualify
2012	JFL	3	17	2nd	32	17	7	8	57	34	23	58	2,810	Not eligible	3rd round
2013	JFL	3	18	1st	34	21	9	4	61	25	36	72	2,339	Not eligible	4th round
2014	J3	3	12	2nd	33	20	9	4	58	23	35	69	3,595	Not eligible	2nd round
2015	J3	3	13	3rd	36	21	7	8	46	28	18	70	4,733	Not eligible	2nd round
2016	J3	3	16	3rd	30	15	7	8	33	22	11	52	5,018	Not eligible	3rd round
2017	J3	3	17	5th	32	13	11	8	34	25	9	50	4,256	Not eligible	4th round
2018	J3	3	17	10th	32	10	11	11	39	37	2	41	3,554	Not eligible	2nd round
2019	J3	3	18	9th	34	13	10	11	35	34	1	49	3,000	Not eligible	2nd round
2020^{2}	J3	3	18	3rd	34	17	8	9	45	26	19	59	2,449	Not eligible	Did not qualify
2021^{2}	J3	3	15	9th	28	8	12	8	35	28	7	36	2,518	Not eligible	2nd round
2022	J3	3	18	8th	34	14	10	10	42	41	1	52	3,308	Not eligible	Did not qualify
2023	J3	3	20	14th	38	13	11	14	52	60	-8	50	3,528	Not eligible	2nd round
2024	J3	3	20	18th	38	7	16	15	44	57	-13	37	4,158	3rd round	2nd round
2025	J3	3	20	19th	38	9	8	21	29	57	-28	35	4,372	1st round	Did not qualify
2026	J3	3	40	37th	18	3	5	10	15	33	-18	16	4,967	N/A	N/A
2026-27	J3	3	20	TBD	38									TBD	TBD

Key

- Pos. = Position in league; GP = Games played; W = Games won; D = Games drawn; L = Games lost; F = Goals scored; A = Goals conceded; GD = Goals difference; Pts = Points gained
- Attendance/G = Average home league attendance
- ^{1} Played only 33 games due to 2011 Tōhoku earthquake and tsunami preventing Sony Sendai FC from hosting home matches
- ^{2} 2020 & 2021 seasons attendances reduced by COVID-19 worldwide pandemic
- Source: J.League data site
