= 2017 Giravanz Kitakyushu season =

Giravanz Kitakyushu
2017 season
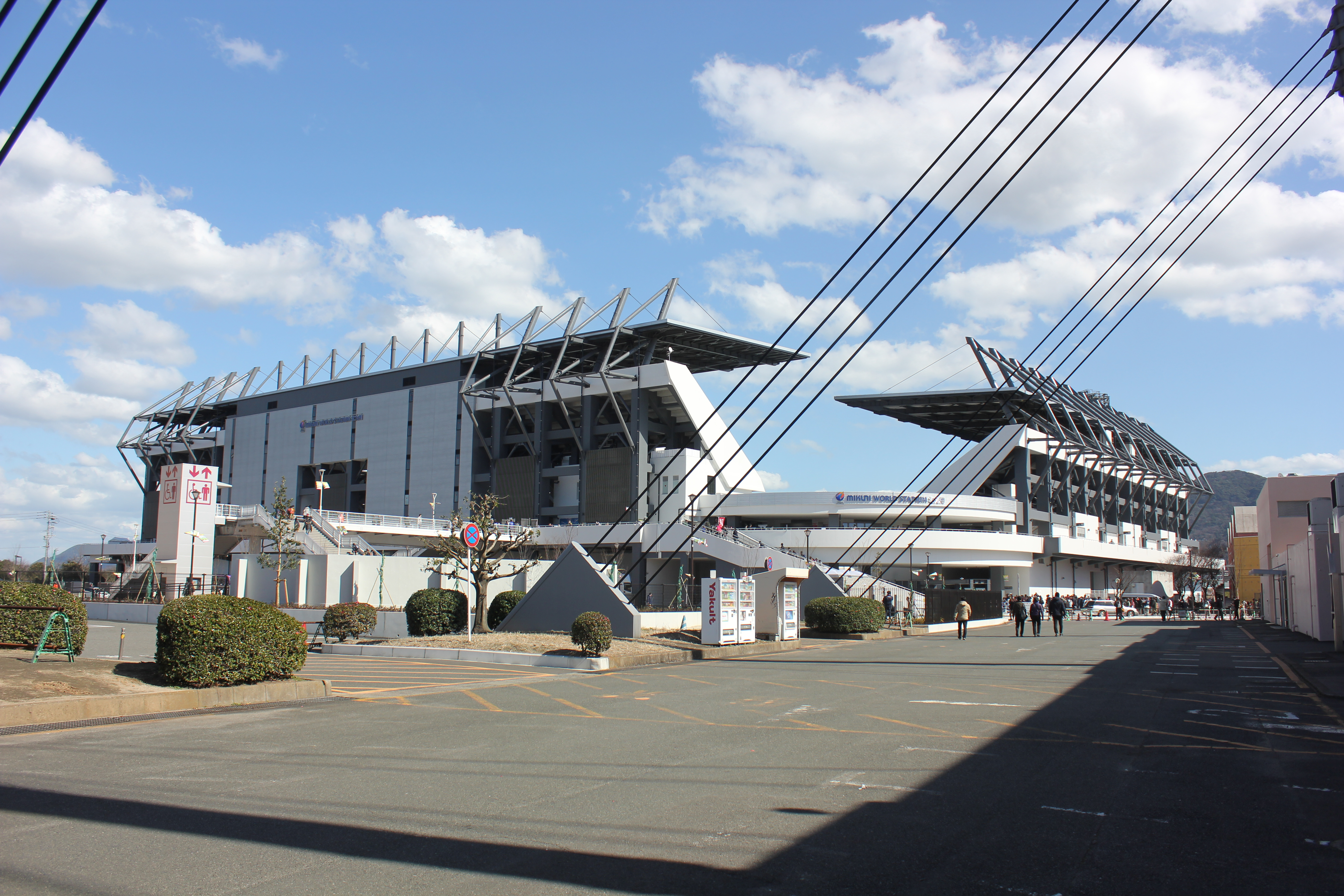
- Manager: Takeo Harada
- Stadium: Mikuni World Stadium Kitakyushu
- J3 League: 9th
Home colours	Away colours

2017 Giravanz Kitakyushu season.

== Squad ==
As of February 15, 2017

Note: Flags indicate national team as defined under FIFA eligibility rules; some limited exceptions apply. Players may hold more than one non-FIFA nationality.

No.	Pos.	Nation	Player
1	GK	JPN	Norihiro Yamagishi
2	DF	JPN	Naoya Ishigami
3	DF	JPN	Kenta Fukumori
4	DF	JPN	Shoto Suzuki
5	DF	JPN	Kazuya Maeda
6	DF	JPN	Hiroyuki Nishijima
7	MF	JPN	Taira Shige
8	MF	JPN	Tsuyoshi Hakkaku
9	FW	JPN	Shoma Mizunaga
10	MF	JPN	Shota Inoue
11	FW	JPN	Tomoki Ikemoto
13	DF	JPN	Itsuki Urata
14	FW	JPN	Shoki Hirai
15	MF	JPN	Daisuke Kanzaki
16	DF	JPN	Kyohei Yumisaki
17	MF	JPN	Koken Kato

No.	Pos.	Nation	Player
18	MF	JPN	Yohei Naito
19	MF	JPN	Daichi Kawashima
20	MF	JPN	Sho Hanai
21	GK	JPN	Takuya Takahashi
22	MF	JPN	Shuto Nakahara
23	MF	JPN	Ryuko Kito
24	MF	JPN	Tatsuya Onodera
25	FW	JPN	Rui Komatsu
26	DF	JPN	Yukiya Kajiwara
27	GK	JPN	Kaiho Nakayama
28	DF	JPN	Shunsuke Fukuda
29	MF	JPN	Kengo Kotani
30	MF	CHN	Sun Jungang
41	DF	JPN	Ryosuke Tone
43	MF	JPN	Masashi Motoyama

== J3 League ==
=== League table ===
Pos	Team	Pld	W	D	L	GF	GA	GD	Pts
6	FC Ryukyu	32	13	11	8	44	36	+8	50
7	Fujieda MYFC	32	12	11	9	50	43	+7	47
8	Kataller Toyama	32	13	8	11	37	33	+4	47
9	Giravanz Kitakyushu	32	13	7	12	44	37	+7	46
10	Fukushima United	32	13	4	15	39	43	−4	43
11	FC Tokyo U-23	32	12	7	13	36	47	−11	43
12	SC Sagamihara	32	9	12	11	34	41	−7	39

Source: 2017 MEIJI YASUDA J3 LEAGUE League table
Rules for classification: 1) Points; 2) Goal difference; 3) Goals scored; 4th) head-to-head results; 5th) disciplinary points; 6th) draw

=== Match details ===
J3 League match details
Match	Date	Team	Score	Team	Venue	Attendance
1	2017.03.12	Giravanz Kitakyushu	1-1	Blaublitz Akita	Mikuni World Stadium Kitakyushu	14,935
3	2017.03.26	Giravanz Kitakyushu	1-0	Cerezo Osaka U-23	Mikuni World Stadium Kitakyushu	4,455
4	2017.04.01	SC Sagamihara	1-0	Giravanz Kitakyushu	Sagamihara Gion Stadium	1,548
5	2017.04.16	Kagoshima United FC	2-1	Giravanz Kitakyushu	Kagoshima Kamoike Stadium	5,157
6	2017.04.30	Giravanz Kitakyushu	3-2	YSCC Yokohama	Mikuni World Stadium Kitakyushu	6,192
7	2017.05.07	Tochigi SC	0-0	Giravanz Kitakyushu	Tochigi Green Stadium	4,459
8	2017.05.14	Giravanz Kitakyushu	2-0	Gainare Tottori	Mikuni World Stadium Kitakyushu	4,395
9	2017.05.21	Fujieda MYFC	2-0	Giravanz Kitakyushu	Fujieda Soccer Stadium	1,085
10	2017.05.28	Giravanz Kitakyushu	1-0	FC Tokyo U-23	Mikuni World Stadium Kitakyushu	3,864
11	2017.06.04	Azul Claro Numazu	1-0	Giravanz Kitakyushu	Ashitaka Park Stadium	2,112
12	2017.06.10	Giravanz Kitakyushu	2-1	Gamba Osaka U-23	Mikuni World Stadium Kitakyushu	6,140
13	2017.06.18	Fukushima United FC	0-3	Giravanz Kitakyushu	Toho Stadium	1,304
14	2017.06.25	Giravanz Kitakyushu	1-2	AC Nagano Parceiro	Mikuni World Stadium Kitakyushu	4,160
15	2017.07.01	Kataller Toyama	2-1	Giravanz Kitakyushu	Toyama Stadium	2,831
16	2017.07.08	Giravanz Kitakyushu	5-1	Grulla Morioka	Mikuni World Stadium Kitakyushu	4,857
17	2017.07.15	FC Ryukyu	0-0	Giravanz Kitakyushu	Okinawa Athletic Park Stadium	3,180
18	2017.07.22	FC Tokyo U-23	1-2	Giravanz Kitakyushu	Ajinomoto Field Nishigaoka	2,122
19	2017.08.19	Giravanz Kitakyushu	0-1	Fujieda MYFC	Mikuni World Stadium Kitakyushu	3,868
20	2017.08.26	Giravanz Kitakyushu	2-0	FC Ryukyu	Mikuni World Stadium Kitakyushu	13,880
21	2017.09.03	Grulla Morioka	0-3	Giravanz Kitakyushu	Iwagin Stadium	1,106
22	2017.09.09	Giravanz Kitakyushu	0-1	Fukushima United FC	Mikuni World Stadium Kitakyushu	4,727
24	2017.09.23	Giravanz Kitakyushu	0-2	Kataller Toyama	Mikuni World Stadium Kitakyushu	4,843
25	2017.10.01	Giravanz Kitakyushu	3-0	SC Sagamihara	Mikuni World Stadium Kitakyushu	4,532
26	2017.10.08	YSCC Yokohama	2-1	Giravanz Kitakyushu	NHK Spring Mitsuzawa Football Stadium	1,152
23	2017.10.11	Cerezo Osaka U-23	2-2	Giravanz Kitakyushu	Yanmar Stadium Nagai	674
27	2017.10.15	Giravanz Kitakyushu	0-4	Kagoshima United FC	Mikuni World Stadium Kitakyushu	4,270
28	2017.10.22	Blaublitz Akita	1-0	Giravanz Kitakyushu	Akigin Stadium	1,871
29	2017.10.30	Gamba Osaka U-23	2-2	Giravanz Kitakyushu	Suita City Football Stadium	827
30	2017.11.05	Giravanz Kitakyushu	3-2	Tochigi SC	Mikuni World Stadium Kitakyushu	4,182
31	2017.11.12	Gainare Tottori	3-4	Giravanz Kitakyushu	Tottori Bank Bird Stadium	1,191
33	2017.11.26	Giravanz Kitakyushu	0-0	Azul Claro Numazu	Mikuni World Stadium Kitakyushu	5,723
34	2017.12.03	AC Nagano Parceiro	1-1	Giravanz Kitakyushu	Minami Nagano Sports Park Stadium	4,841
