= Ken Yoshida =

Japanese footballer and manager

Ken Yoshida 吉田 謙

Personal information
- Full name: Ken Yoshida
- Date of birth: March 1, 1970 (age 56)
- Place of birth: Kunitachi, Tokyo, Japan
- Height: 1.77 m (5 ft 9 1/2 in)
- Position: Defender

Youth career
- 1984: Juventus-SP
- 1985–1987: Yomiuri
- Nippon Sport Science University

Senior career*
Years	Team	Apps	(Gls)
1988–????	Yomiuri		
????	NKK		
1994–1996	Ventforet Kofu		
1997–1998	Jatco		

Managerial career
- 2015–2019: Azul Claro Numazu
- 2020–: Blaublitz Akita
- * Club domestic league appearances and goals

Ken Yoshida (吉田 謙, Yoshida Ken; born March 1, 1970) is a former Japanese football player and manager. He is the current manager of Blaublitz Akita.

== Playing career ==
Yoshida was born in Tokyo on March 1, 1970. He played for Yomiuri, NKK, Ventforet Kofu and Jatco. He retired in 1998.

== Coaching career ==
After playing in lower leagues and being a coach for the local time since 1999, Yoshida was appointed at Azul Claro Numazu as manager of first squad in December 2014. He took charge of the squad, which was promoted to pro-football in 2016, after coming 3rd in 2016 season. This brought Azul Claro to play for the first time in J3 League.

He saw his contract renewed, ready to tackle pro-football and guide Azul Claro even in J3.

In 2020 Yoshida was appointed manager of Blaublitz Akita. On 18 November, Akita beat Gamba Osaka U-23 0-2 at Panasonic Stadium Suita to win the J3 League.

== Honours ==
Blaublitz Akita

- J3 League (1): 2020

== Managerial statistics ==
Update; October 26, 2022

Team	From	To	Record				
Team	From	To	G	W	D	L	Win %
Azul Claro Numazu	2017	2019	98	41	27	30	41.84
Blaublitz Akita	2020	present	118	47	35	36	39.83
Total			216	88	62	66	40.74
