= Taira Shige =

Japanese footballer

Taira Shige 茂平
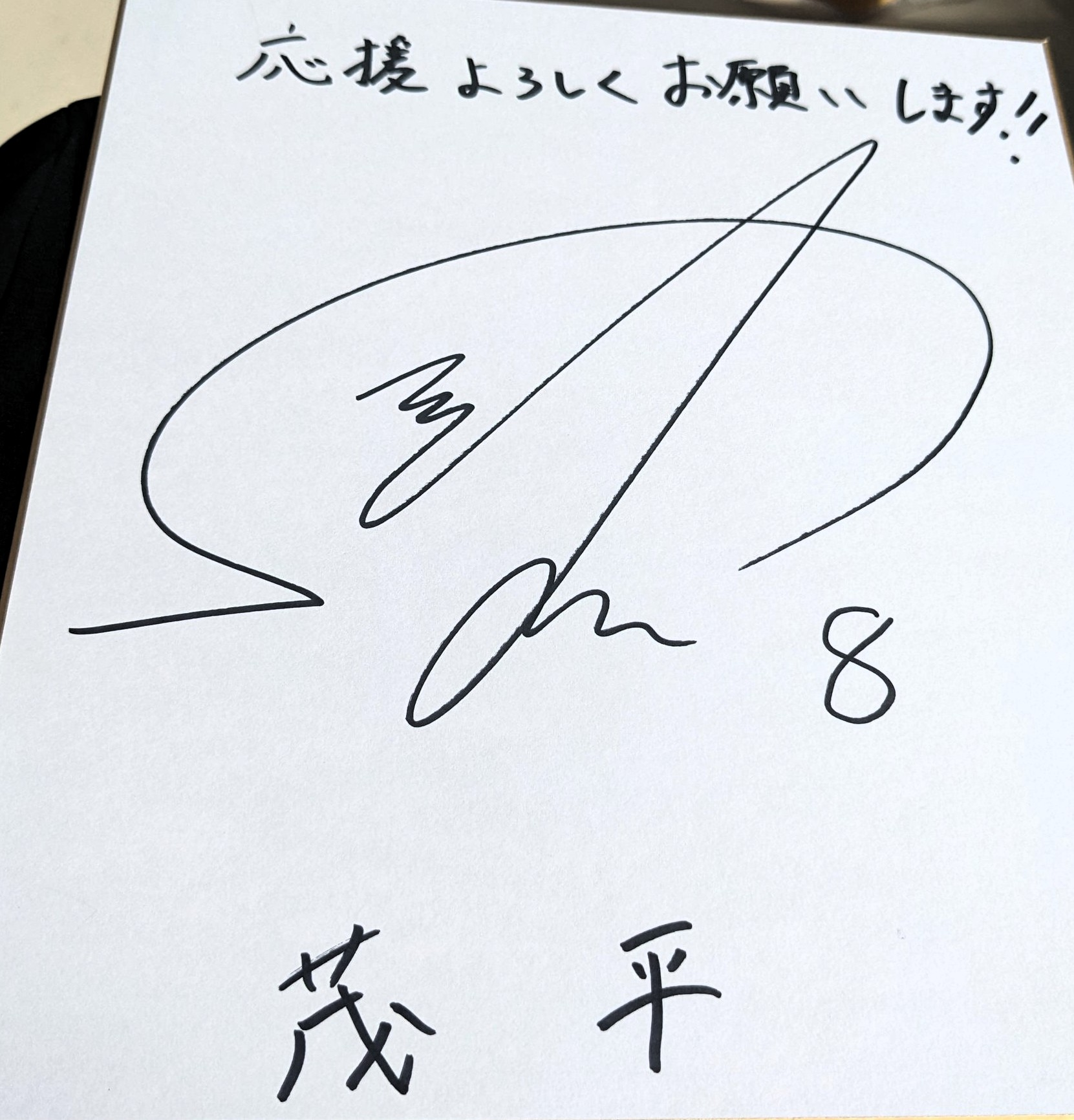

Personal information
- Full name: Taira Shige
- Date of birth: April 9, 1993 (age 33)
- Place of birth: Ōmura, Nagasaki, Japan
- Height: 1.72 m (5 ft 7 1/2 in)
- Position: Midfielder

Team information
- Current team: Oita Trinita
- Number: 16

Youth career
- –2008: Kicks FC
- 2009–2011: Oita Trinita

College career
Years	Team	Apps	(Gls)
2012–2015	Ritsumeikan University		

Senior career*
Years	Team	Apps	(Gls)
2016	Nara Club	25	(15)
2017–2019	Giravanz Kitakyushu	52	(1)
2020–2022	Blaublitz Akita	103	(8)
2023–	Oita Trinita	61	(1)
- * Club domestic league appearances and goals as of 16 August 2026

Taira Shige (茂平, Shige Taira; born April 9, 1993) is a Japanese football player for Oita Trinita.

== Career ==
After a season with Nara Club in Japan Football League, Shige moved to Giravanz Kitakyushu and debuted in pro-football as March 2017, when he played his first game with Gira against Cerezo Osaka U-23.

== Club statistics ==
Updated to 2 December 2022.

Appearances and goals by club, season and competition
Club	Season	League			Emperor's Cup		Total	
Club	Season	Division	Apps	Goals	Apps	Goals	Apps	Goals
Ritsumeikan University	2015	-	0	0	1	0	1	0
Nara Club	2016	JFL	25	15	2	1	27	16
Giravanz Kitakyushu	2017	J3 League	21	0	2	1	23	1
Giravanz Kitakyushu	2018	J3 League	15	0	–		15	0
Giravanz Kitakyushu	2019	J3 League	16	1	1	0	17	1
Blaublitz Akita	2020	J3 League	28	4	2	1	30	5
Blaublitz Akita	2021	J2 League	42	2	0	0	42	2
Blaublitz Akita	2022	J2 League	33	2	0	0	33	2
Total			150	24	8	3	188	27

== Honours ==
Giravanz Kitakyushu, Blaublitz Akita

- J3 League (2): 2019, 2020

=== Individual ===
- JFL Best XI: 2016
- JFL Rookie of the Year: 2016

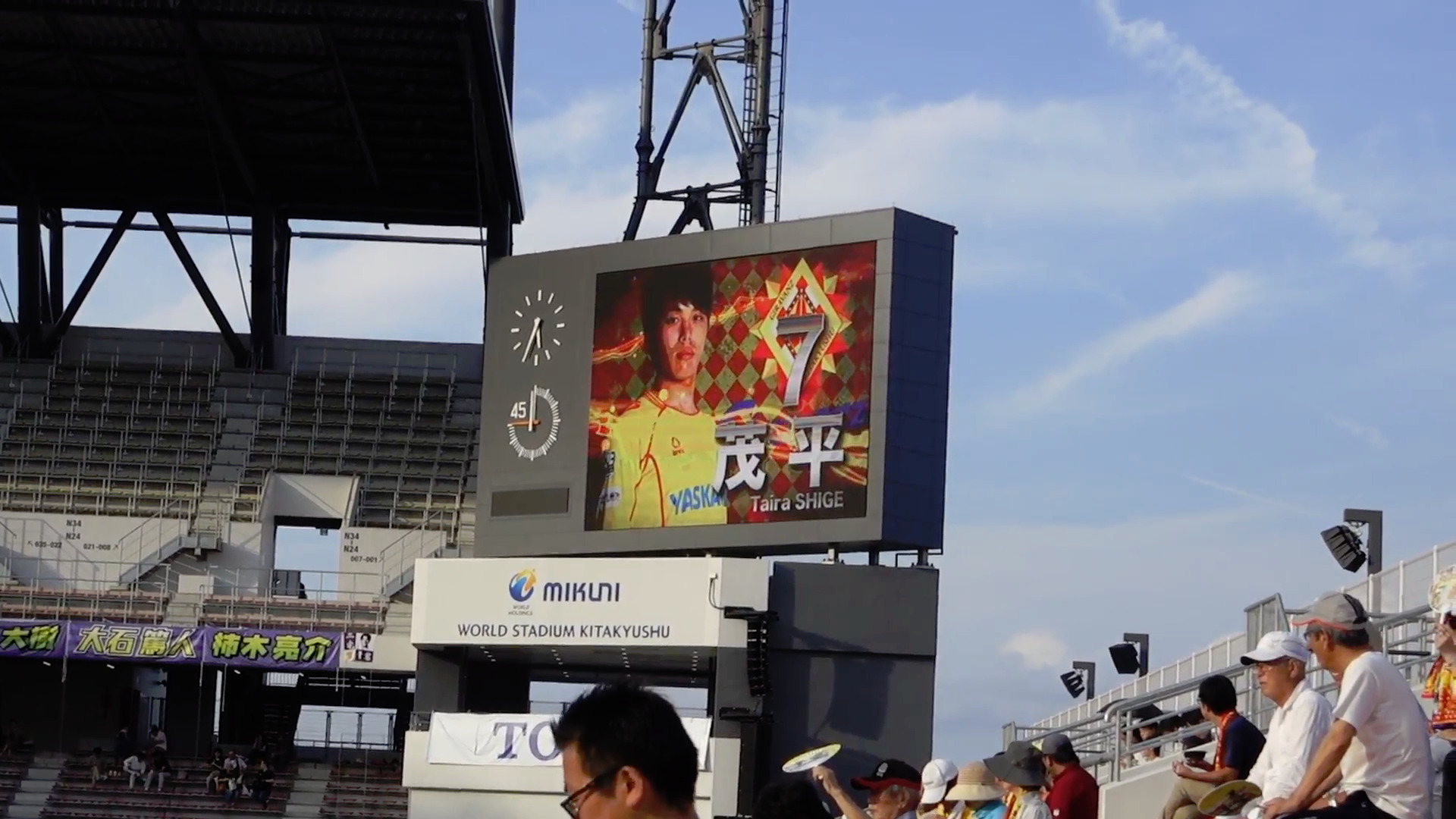
Kitakyushu scoreboard
