= 2020 Blaublitz Akita season =

Blaublitz Akita
2020 season
- Chairman: Kosuke Iwase
- Manager: Ken Yoshida
- Stadium: Soyu Stadium
- J3 League: Champions
- Emperor's Cup: Semi-final
- Top goalscorer: Ryota Nakamura (10)
- Highest home attendance: 2,078
- Lowest home attendance: 0
- Average home league attendance: 1,221 (−22.5%)
Home colours	Away colours

2020 Blaublitz Akita season. The annual club slogan is "結". "Chuggernaut" Akita clinched its second J3 League title with six games to spare after a 2–0 win over Gamba Osaka U-23, and have been promoted to J2 on November 18, 2020. Blaublitz has earned the 4th seed in the Emperor's Cup.

== Squad ==
As of 2020.

Note: Flags indicate national team as defined under FIFA eligibility rules; some limited exceptions apply. Players may hold more than one non-FIFA nationality.

No.	Pos.	Nation	Player
1	GK	JPN	Yasuhiro Watanabe
2	DF	JPN	Kenshiro Tanioku
3	DF	JPN	Junya Suzuki
4	DF	JPN	Mizuki Aiba
5	DF	JPN	Kaito Chida
6	MF	JPN	Yuji Wakasa
7	MF	JPN	Kyohei Maeyama
8	MF	JPN	Taira Shige
9	FW	JPN	Ryota Nakamura
10	MF	JPN	Yuta Shimozawa
11	MF	JPN	Ken Hisatomi
13	FW	JPN	Yohei Hayashi
14	FW	JPN	Yosuke Mikami
15	MF	JPN	Nao Eguchi

No.	Pos.	Nation	Player
16	FW	JPN	Naoki Inoue
17	DF	KOR	Han Ho-gang
18	FW	JPN	Kenji Kitawaki
20	MF	JPN	Takuma Aoshima
21	GK	JPN	Yudai Tanaka
22	MF	JPN	Masaki Okino
23	GK	JPN	Daiki Koike
24	DF	JPN	Naoyuki Yamada (captain)
25	MF	JPN	Keisuke Ono
26	FW	JPN	Naoki Tanaka
29	FW	JPN	Keita Saito
30	GK	JPN	Yuki Yasuda
31	DF	JPN	Yudai Tanaka
39	DF	JPN	Shoma Kamata
40	FW	JPN	Koya Handa
50	DF	JPN	Kenichi Kaga

== J3 League ==
Match	Date	Team	Score	Team	Venue	Attendance
1	2020.06.27	Grulla Morioka	0-4	Blaublitz Akita	Iwagin Stadium	0
2	2020.07.04	Blaublitz Akita	2-0	Fukushima United	Soyu Stadium	0
3	2020.07.11	Vanraure Hachinohe	0-2	Blaublitz Akita	Prifoods Stadium	444
4	2020.07.15	Kataller Toyama	0-1	Blaublitz Akita	Toyama Stadium	715
5	2020.07.19	Blaublitz Akita	1-0	Nagano Parceiro	Soyu Stadium	1,089
6	2020.07.25	Fujieda MYFC	0-2	Blaublitz Akita	Fujieda Soccer Stadium	615
7	2020.07.29	Blaublitz Akita	3-1	SC Sagamihara	Soyu Stadium	865
8	2020.08.02	YSCC	0-1	Blaublitz Akita	Nippatsu Mitsuzawa Stadium	745
9	2020.08.09	Blaublitz Akita	2-1	Roasso Kumamoto	Soyu Stadium	1,407
10	2020.08.15	Kamatamare Sanuki	0-0	Blaublitz Akita	Pikara Stadium	953
11	2020.08.22	Blaublitz Akita	1-1	Gamba Osaka U-23	Soyu Stadium	2,078
13	2020.09.02	Blaublitz Akita	3-1	Azul Claro Numazu	Soyu Stadium	795
14	2020.09.06	Blaublitz Akita	0-0	Cerezo Osaka U-23	Soyu Stadium	1,451
15	2020.09.13	FC Imabari	0-1	Blaublitz Akita	Arigato Service Dream Stadium	1,499
16	2020.09.19	Blaublitz Akita	4-0	Gainare Tottori	Soyu Stadium	1,176
17	2020.09.22	Blaublitz Akita	0-0	Kagoshima United	Soyu Stadium	1,490
18	2020.09.26	Fukushima United	0-2	Blaublitz Akita	Toho Stadium	644
19	2020.10.03	Blaublitz Akita	2-1	Grulla Morioka	Soyu Stadium	977
20	2020.10.07	Blaublitz Akita	0-0	YSCC	Soyu Stadium	717
21	2020.10.11	Cerezo Osaka U-23	2-3	Blaublitz Akita	Yanmar Stadium Nagai	609
12	2020.10.14	FC Gifu	0-5	Blaublitz Akita	Nagaragawa Stadium	1,758
22	2020.10.18	Blaublitz Akita	0-0	Fujieda MYFC	Soyu Stadium	1,242
23	2020.10.25	Azul Claro Numazu	0-0	Blaublitz Akita	Asahitaka Stadium	1,586
24	2020.10.31	Blaublitz Akita	2-1	Vanraure Hachinohe	Soyu Stadium	1,081
25	2020.11.03	Blaublitz Akita	5-0	Kamatamare Sanuki	Soyu Stadium	880
26	2020.11.08	Nagano Parceiro	0-0	Blaublitz Akita	Nagano U Stadium	3,661
27	2020.11.14	Blaublitz Akita	1-0	FC Gifu	Soyu Stadium	1,224
28	2020.11.18	Gamba Osaka U-23	0-2	Blaublitz Akita	Panasonic Stadium Suita	480
29	2020.11.22	Blaublitz Akita	0-1	Kataller Toyama	Soyu Stadium	2,063
30	2020.11.29	Roasso Kumamoto	2-4	Blaublitz Akita	Egao Kenko Stadium	3,435
31	2020.12.05	Blaublitz Akita	1-3	FC Imabari	Soyu Stadium	2,226
32	2020.12.09	Gainare Tottori	0-0	Blaublitz Akita	Axis Bird Stadium	680
33	2020.12.13	SC Sagamihara	1-1	Blaublitz Akita	Sagamihara Gion Stadium	2,542
34	2020.12.20	Kagoshima United	3-0	Blaublitz Akita	Shiranami Stadium	3,990

== Emperor's Cup ==
23 December 2020 Quarter-final	Blaublitz Akita	3-1	Fukuyama City FC	Sendai
19:00	Shige 15'; Hisatomi 45+1'; Eguchi 89'	Report	Yoshii 41'	Stadium: Yurtec Stadium Sendai; Attendance: 202; Referee: Yoshirro Imamura

27 December 2020 Semi-final	Kawasaki Frontale	2-0	Blaublitz Akita	Kawasaki, Kanagawa
13:00 JST	Mitoma 39'; Tanaka 83'	Report		Stadium: Kawasaki Todoroki Stadium; Attendance: 9,772; Referee: Yudai Yamamoto

== Other games ==
5 February 2020	Albirex Niigata	0-0	Blaublitz Akita	Haruno Athletic Field
10:30		Report

9 February 2020	Kamatamare Sanuki	4-1	Blaublitz Akita	Haruno Athletic Field
		ブラウブリッツ秋田 vs カマタマーレ讃岐 トレーニングマッチダイジェスト	Saito

15 February 2020	Kochi United SC	3-4	Blaublitz Akita	Haruno Athletic Field
	Nishimura; Izumi trainee	Report; Report; Report	Nakamurax2; Hisatomi; Han

6 June 2020	Albirex Niigata	3-0	Blaublitz Akita	Niigata Seiro Sports Center
13:00	Silvinho 41'; Yamura 54'; Mori 86'	Report

== Gallery ==
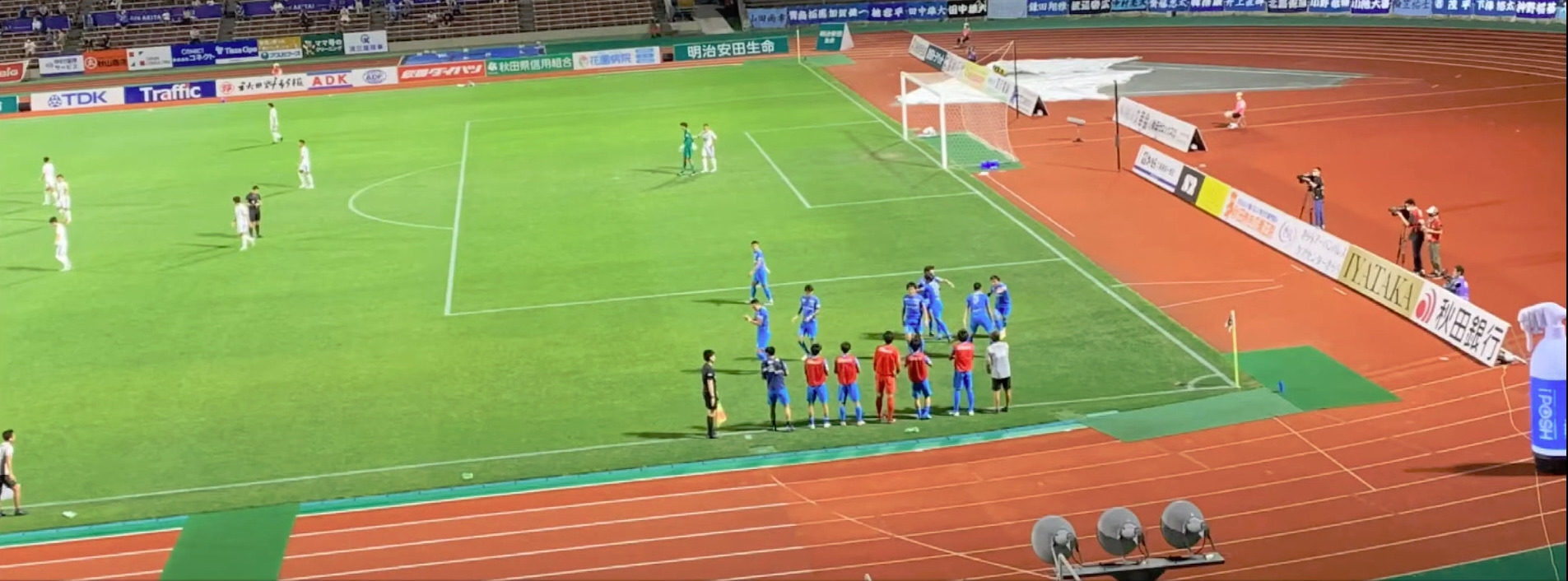
v. Numazu 2020.09.02

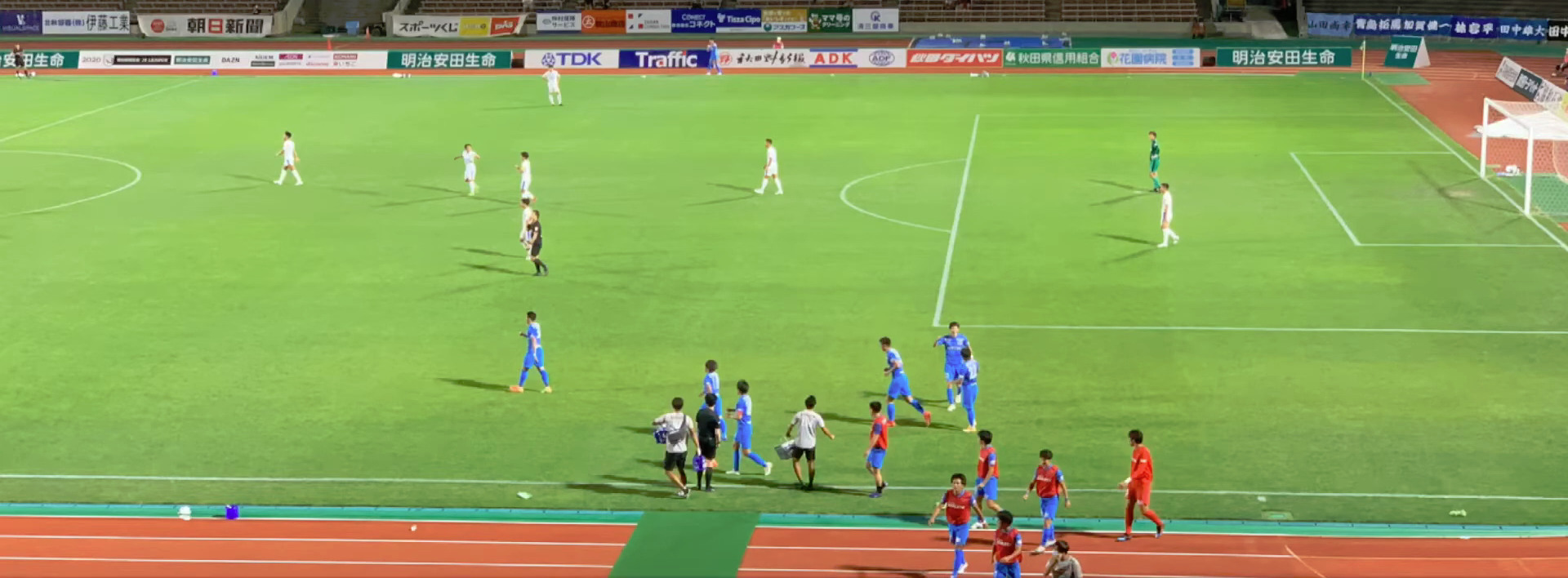

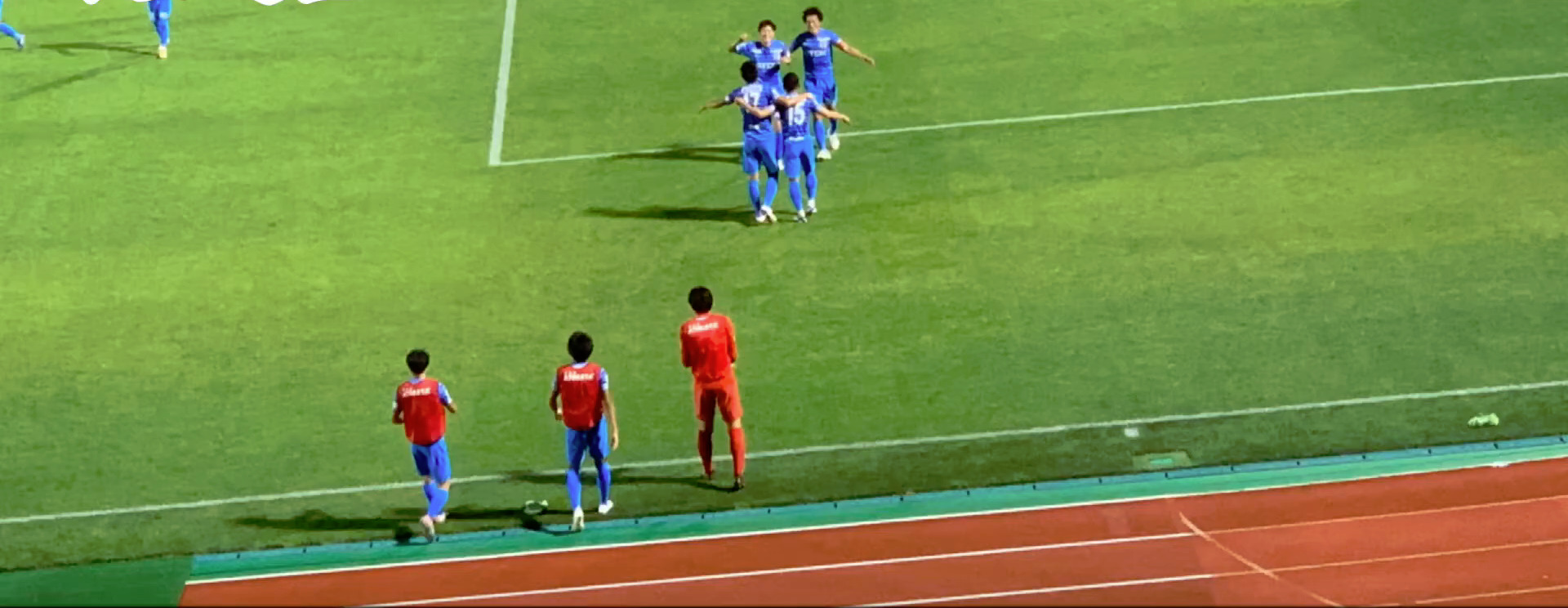

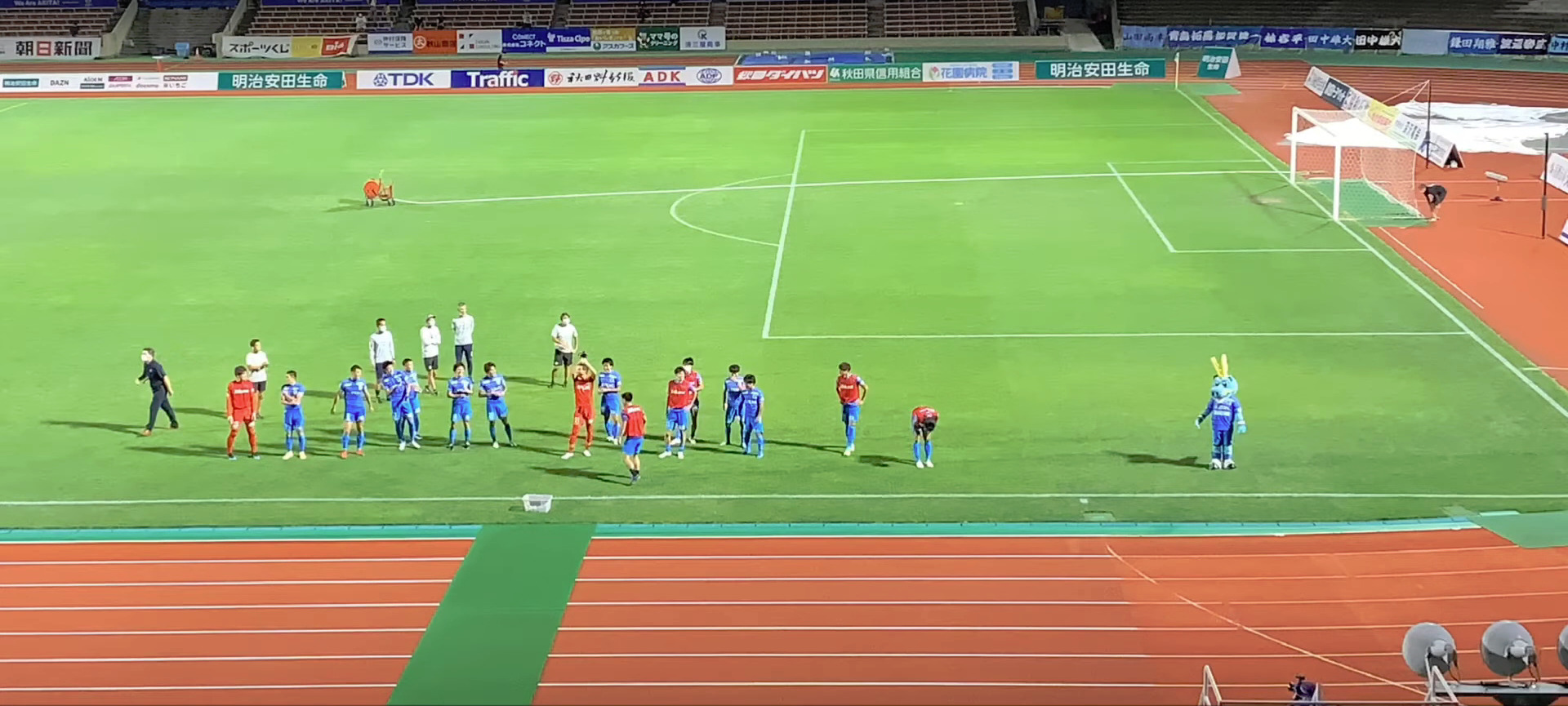

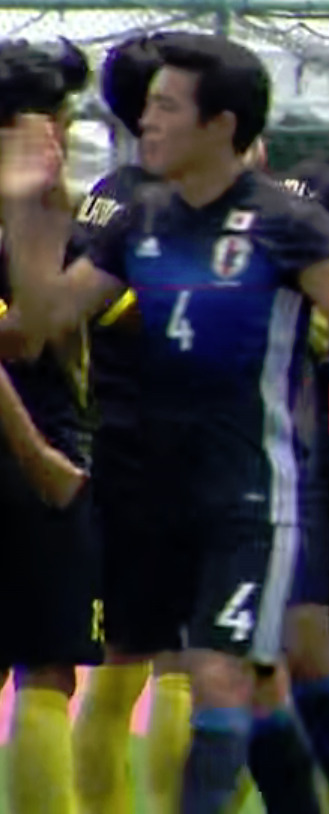
Junya Suzuki

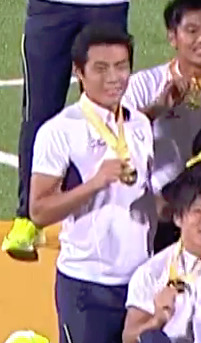
Suzuki

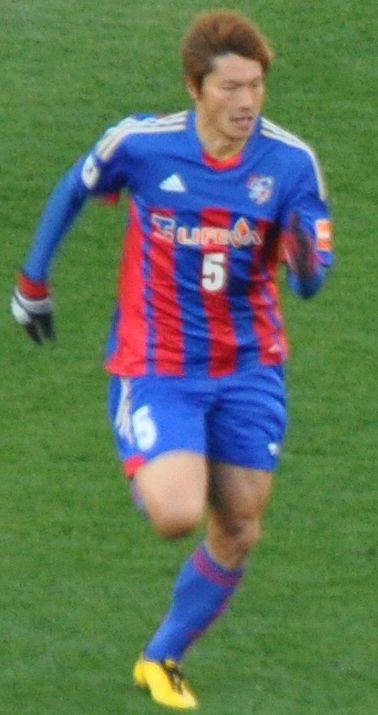
Kaga

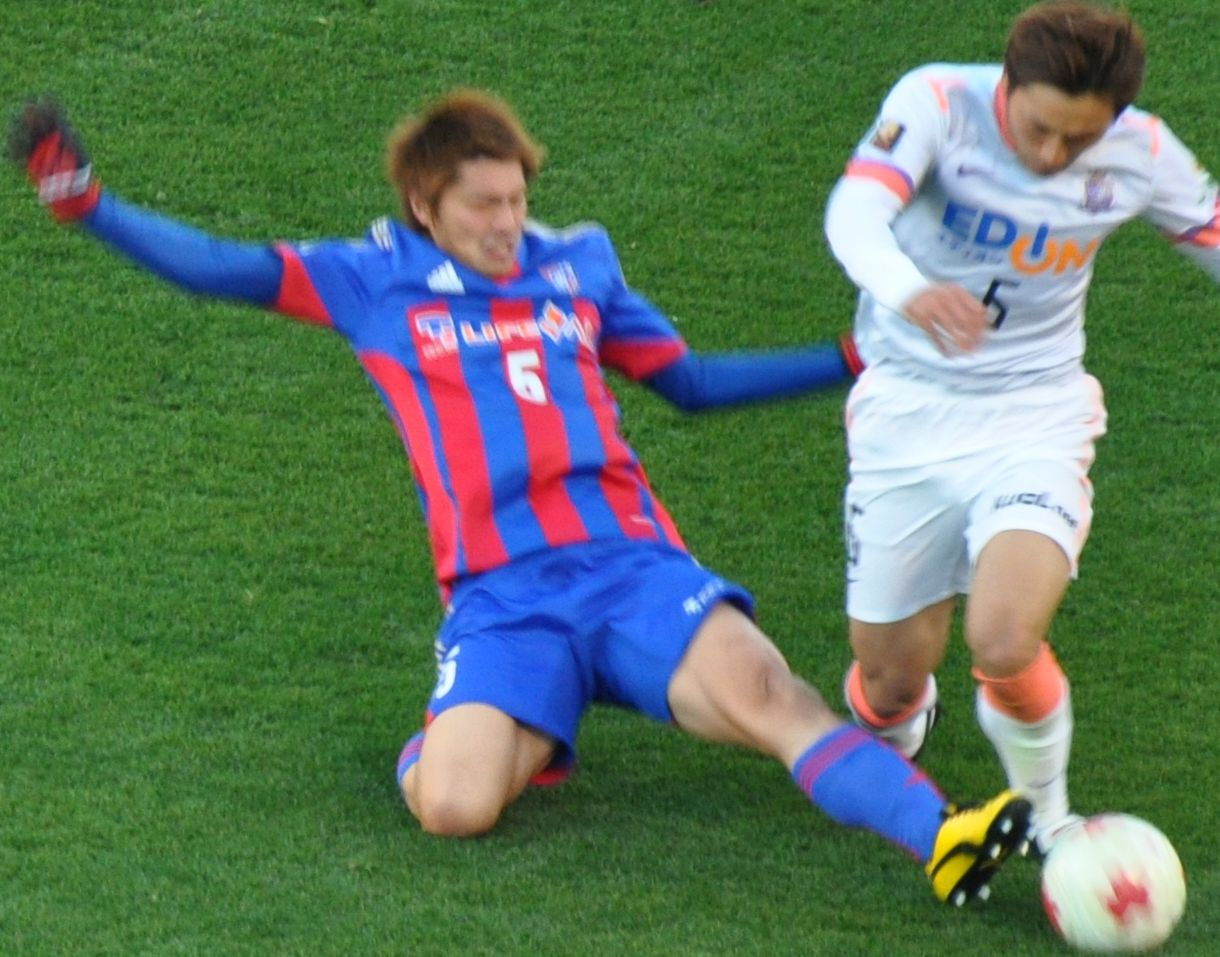
Kaga

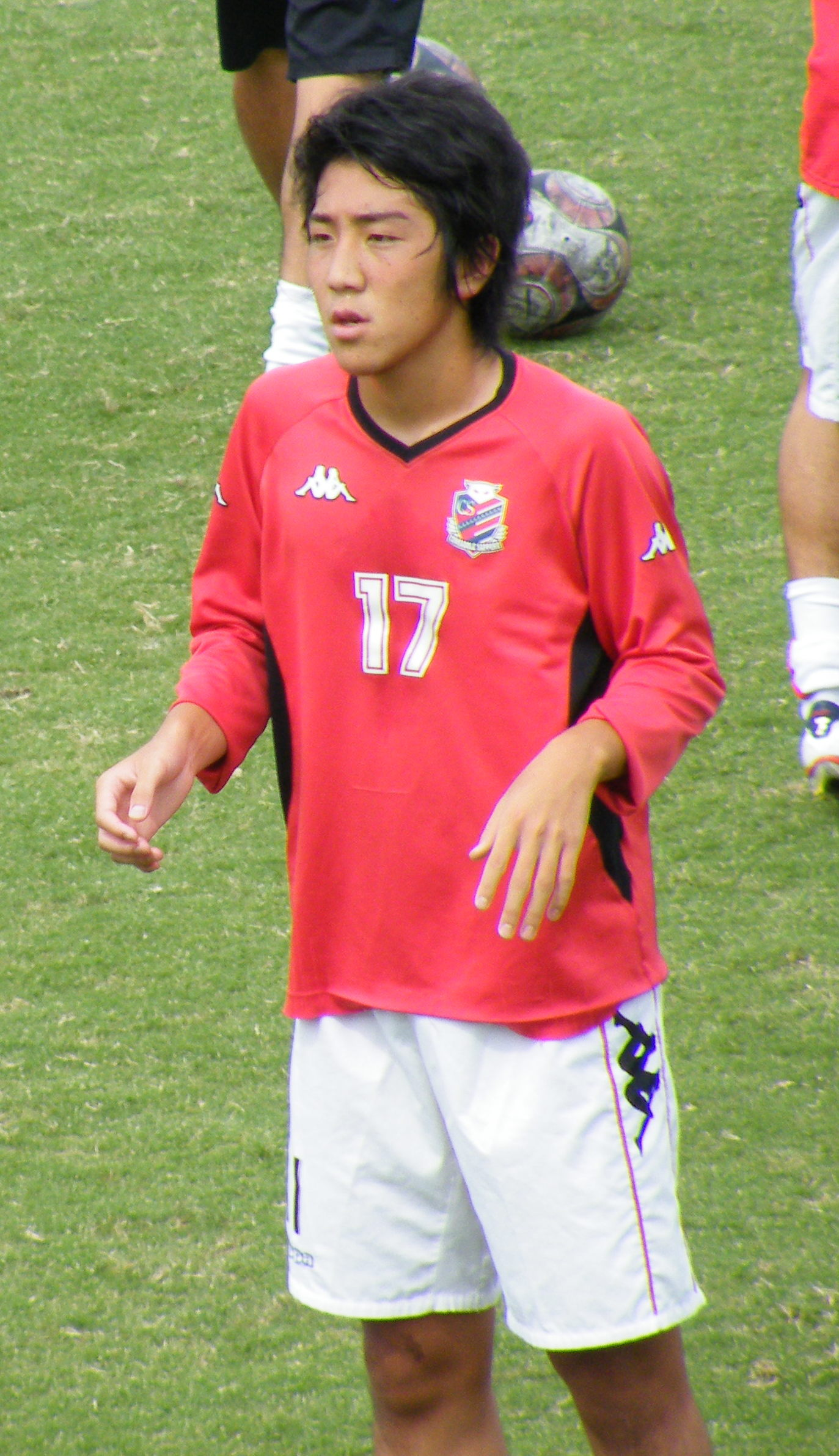
Mikami

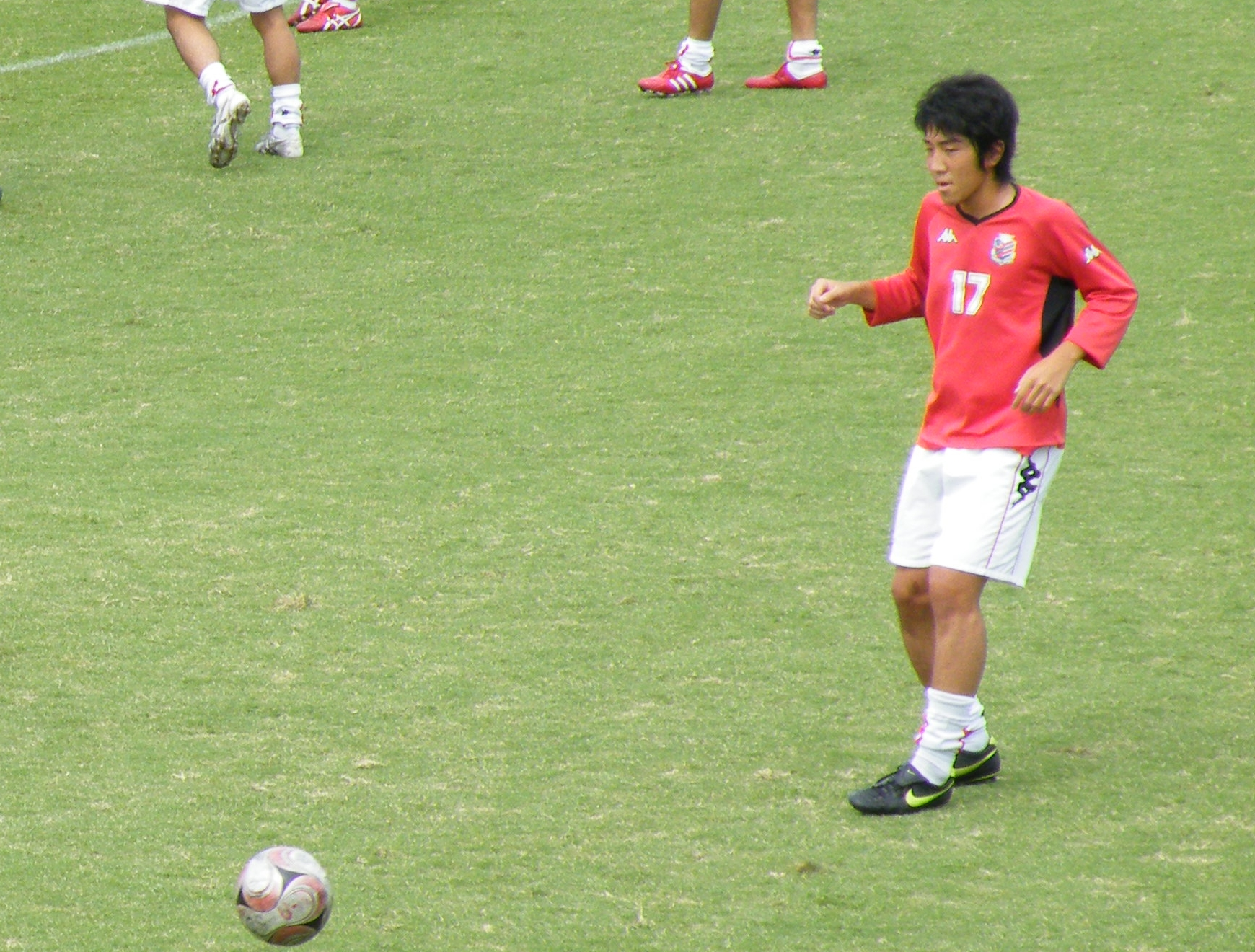
Mikami

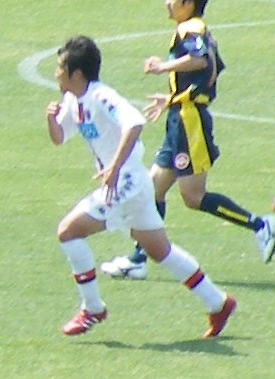
Mikami

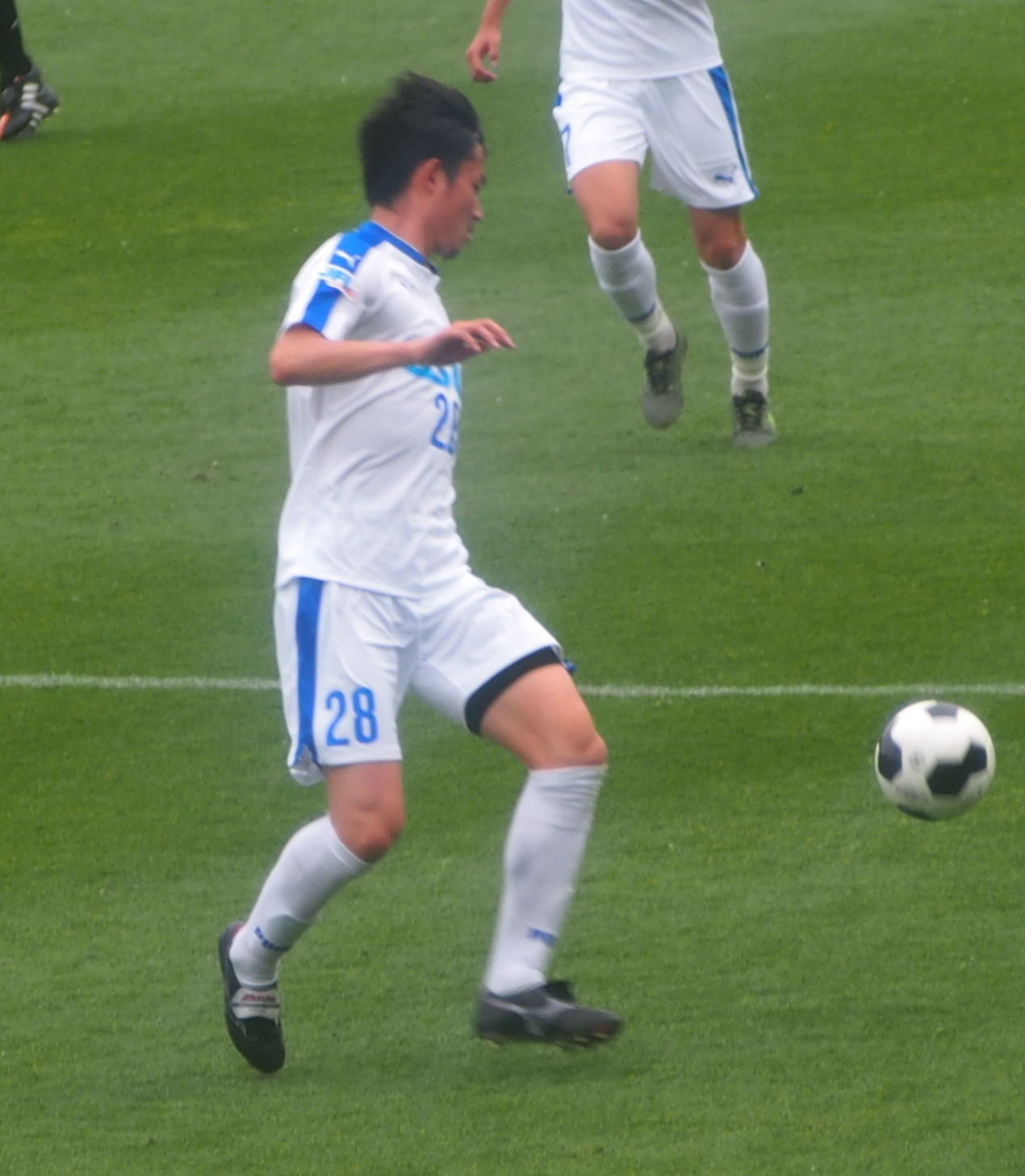
Tanioku

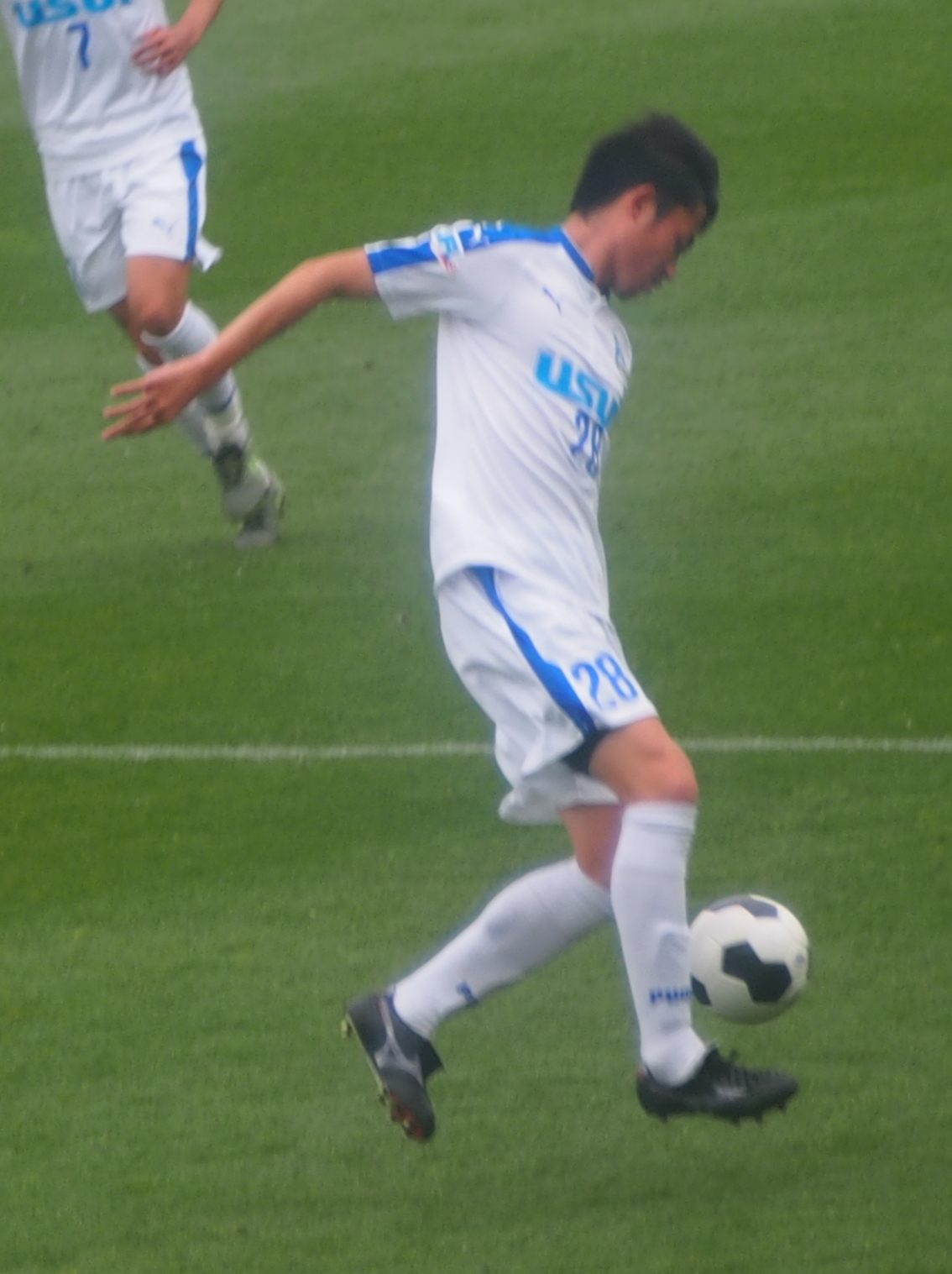
Tanioku
