= Mizuki Aiba =

Japanese footballer (born 1997)

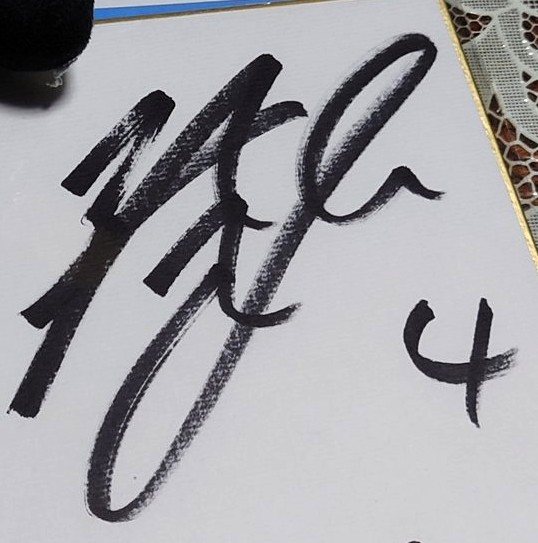

Personal information
- Full name: Mizuki Aiba
- Date of birth: 3 May 1997 (age 29)
- Place of birth: Wakayama, Wakayama, Japan
- Height: 1.80 m (5 ft 11 in)
- Position: Defender

Team information
- Current team: Veertien Mie
- Number: 4

Youth career
- 2013–2015: Rissho Univ. Shonan High School

College career
Years	Team	Apps	(Gls)
2016–2019	Fukuoka University		

Senior career*
Years	Team	Apps	(Gls)
2020-2021	Blaublitz Akita	0	(0)
2021	→FC Kariya	3	(0)
2022	Kochi United SC	29	(1)
2023	Vanraure Hachinohe	5	(1)
2024-	Veertien Mie	0	(0)
- * Club domestic league appearances and goals as of 29 August 2023

Mizuki Aiba (饗庭 瑞生, Aiba Mizuki; born 3 May 1997) is a Japanese footballer currently playing as a defender for Veertien Mie.

== Career ==
He was born in the City of Wakayama and attended the Shonan High School of Rissho University. After graduating from Fukuoka University, Aiba signed with J3 League team Blaublitz Akita and won the championship in 2020. In his third season he played with Kochi United SC and bagged a headed goal on Matchweek 23. He signed a contract with the third tier club Vanraure Hachinohe and scored his first professional goal on 29 April 2023.

== Career statistics ==
=== Club ===
As of 29 May 2023.

Club	Season	League			National Cup		League Cup		Other		Total	
Club	Season	Division	Apps	Goals	Apps	Goals	Apps	Goals	Apps	Goals	Apps	Goals
Fukuoka University	2018		–		2	0	–		–		2	0
Blaublitz Akita	2020	J3	0	0	0	0	–		0	0	0	0
Blaublitz Akita	2021	J2	0	0	1	0	–		0	0	1	0
FC Kariya	2021	JFL	3	0	0	0	–		0	0	3	0
Kochi United SC	2022	JFL	29	1	1	0	–		0	0	30	1
Vanraure Hachinohe	2023	J3	5	1	1	0	–		0	0	6	1
Career total			37	2	5	0	0	0	0	0	42	2

== Honours ==
Blaublitz Akita

- J3 League (1): 2020
